= Joan of Artois, Countess of Foix =

French noblewoman

Joan of Artois
- Countess of Foix; Viscountess of Béarn
- Born: 1289; Conches, France
- Died: after 24 March 1350; Carbonne, France
- Noble family: Artois
- Spouse: Gaston I, Count of Foix
- Issue: Gaston II, Count of Foix; Roger Bernard IV de Foix; Robert de Foix, Bishop of Lavaur; Marguerite de Foix; Blanche de Foix; Jeanne de Foix
- Father: Philip of Artois
- Mother: Blanche de Dreux

Joan of Artois, Countess of Foix, Viscountess of Béarn (French: Jeanne d'Artois; 1289 – after 24 March 1350), was a French noblewoman, and the wife of Gaston I de Foix, Count of Foix, Viscount of Béarn. From 1331 to 1347 she was imprisoned by her eldest son on charges of scandalous conduct, dissolution, and profligacy.

== Family ==
Joan was born in 1289 in Conches, France, the second eldest daughter of Philip of Artois and Blanche de Dreux. Her paternal grandparents were Robert II of Artois and Amicie de Courtenay, and her maternal grandparents were John II, Duke of Brittany and Beatrice of England, the daughter of King Henry III of England and Eleanor of Provence. Joan had two brothers, Robert III of Artois, and Othon of Artois; and four sisters, Margaret, Isabelle, Marie, and Catherine, Countess of Aumale.

In 1298, when Joan was nine years old, her father died of the wounds he had received at the Battle of Furnes in which he had fought a year earlier.

Joan's aunt was Mahaut of Artois with whom her brother Robert would litigate to obtain possession of the County of Artois which Mahaut had inherited suo jure despite being challenged by Robert, who believed the title and estates rightfully belonged to him following the death of his grandfather Robert II in 1302 at the Battle of the Golden Spurs. However, Mahaut's rights as suo jure Countess of Artois were upheld by King Philip IV, and upon her own death in 1329, the title passed to her daughter, Joan II, Countess of Burgundy, and Queen consort of King Philip V of France.

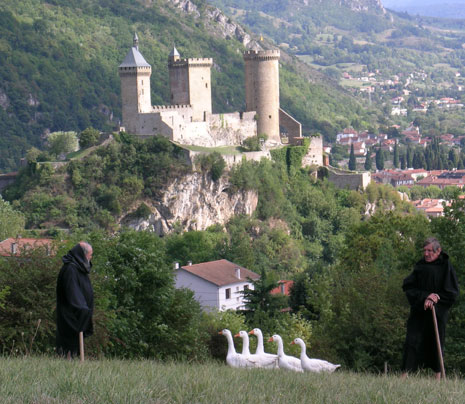
The Château de Foix where Jeanne of Artois was imprisoned in 1331

== Marriage and issue ==
The letters of King Philip IV dated 7 April 1299, recount the private agreements between the king and Roger Bernard III, Count of Foix relating to the proposed marriage of Joan (who was ten years old at the time), to the Count's eldest son, Gaston (born 1287). In October 1301 at Senlis, the marriage contract was signed and Joan was subsequently wed to Gaston de Foix. Five months later on 3 March 1302, upon the death of his father, Gaston became the Count of Foix and Viscount of Béarn; however his mother Marguerite de Béarn acted as his regent until he reached his majority.

Gaston and Joan together had:

- Gaston II de Foix, Count of Foix, Viscount of Béarn (1308 – 26 September 1343), married in 1327 Eleanore de Comminges (died after 16 May 1365), daughter of Bernard VII, Count of Comminges and Laure de Montfort, by whom he had a son, Gaston III, Count of Foix, Viscount of Béarn; he also had several illegitimate children by his favourite mistress Marie de Sans de Roncevalles, as well as by other women whose names are not recorded.
- Roger Bernard IV de Foix (1310 – after 24 March 1350), married Constanza de Luna (1310 – January 1353), daughter of Artal de Luna and Constanza Perez of Aragon, by whom he had three children.
- Robert de Foix, Bishop of Lavaur
- Margaret of Foix
- Blanche de Foix, married in 1328 Jean de Grailly, Viscount of Castillon, Captal de Buch, by whom she had two children, including Jean III de Grailly, Captal de Buch.
- Joan of Foix (died 1358), married Infante Peter of Aragon, Count of Ribagorza, Ampurias and Prades, son of James II of Aragon and wife Blanche of Anjou, by whom she had three children, including Eleanor of Aragon, Queen of Cyprus, titular Queen of Jerusalem.

== Imprisonment ==
Joan's powerful influence over her husband Gaston created permanent conflict with both the local nobility and the administration, who in 1317 issued a request to Parliament in order to discharge her from the guardianship of her children, accusing her of scandalous conduct, dissolution and profligacy. A charter dated 1317 legally prevented her from having the guardianship of her children. Joan's husband had died from illness two years previously on 13 December 1315 in Pontoise. In spite of a compromise signed in 1325 in Beaugency, bitter quarrels became more frequent between Joan and her eldest son Gaston who had succeeded his father as Count of Foix. In 1331, King Philip VI authorised Gaston to imprison Joan in the Château de Foix. She was later moved to Orthez, then to Lourdes; finally in 1347, her third eldest son, the Bishop of Lavaur secured her release from prison and she retired to Carbonne. French historian Jules Michelet suggested a link between Joan's imprisonment in 1331 and the fact that her brother Robert was at the time being sued for forgery and accused of practising witchcraft against the life of King Philip VI.

Joan died on an unknown date sometime after 24 March 1350.

== Ancestors ==
Ancestors of Joan of Artois, Countess of Foix

16. Louis VIII of France
8. Robert I of Artois
17. Blanche of Castile
4. Robert II of Artois
18. Henry II, Duke of Brabant
9. Matilda of Brabant
19. Marie of Hohenstaufen
2. Philip of Artois
20. Robert de Courtenay
10. Pierre de Courtenay
21. Mahaut de Mehun
5. Amicie de Courtenay
22. Gaucher de Joigny
11. Pétronille de Joigny
23. Amicie de Montfort
1. Joan of Artois
24. Peter I, Duke of Brittany
12. John I, Duke of Brittany
25. Alix, Duchess of Brittany
6. John II, Duke of Brittany
26. Theobald I of Navarre
13. Blanche of Navarre (1226–1283)
27. Agnes of Beaujeu
3. Blanche of Brittany
28. John of England
14. Henry III of England
29. Isabella of Angoulême
7. Beatrice of England
30. Ramon Berenguer IV, Count of Provence
15. Eleanor of Provence
31. Beatrice of Savoy

== Sources ==
- de Lage, Guy Raynaud (1976). Les premiers romans français et autres études littéraires et linguistiques (in French). Librairie Droz.
- Lodge, Eleanor C. (1926). Gascony under English Rule. Methuen & Co. Ltd.
- Michelet, Jules (1971). Viallaneix, Paul (ed.). Histoire de France (in French). Vol. V. Flammarion.
- Vale, Malcolm Graham Allan (1996). The Origins of the Hundred Years War: The Angevin Legacy, 1250-1340. Clarendon Press.
- Viader, Roland (2003). L'Andorre du IXe au XIVe siècle: montagne, féodalité et communautés (in French). Presses Universitaire du Mirail.
- Wagner, John A., ed. (2006). "Robert of Artois (1287-1342)". Encyclopedia of the Hundred Years War. Greenwood Press.
