= Blanche of Brittany =

Wife of Philip of Artois

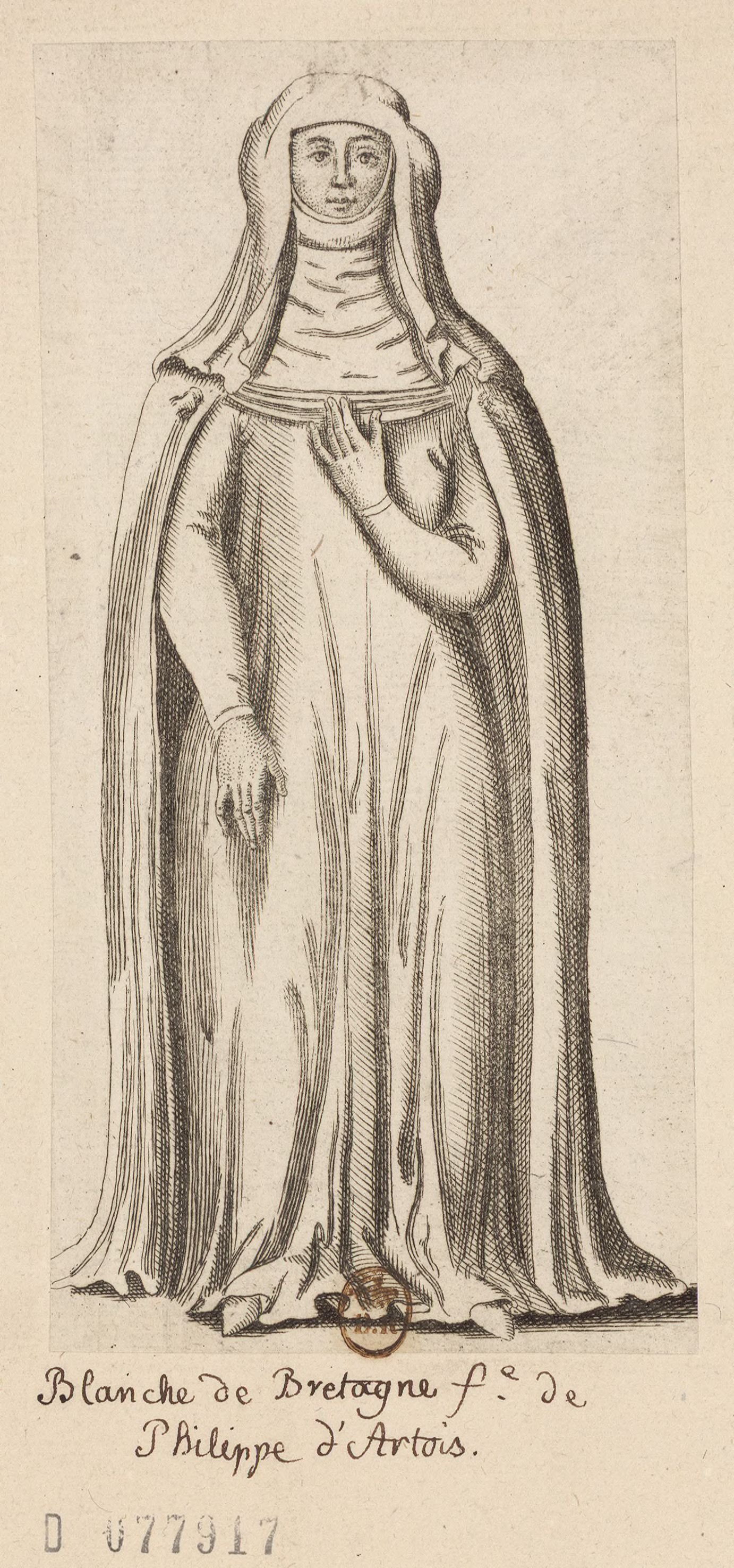
- Portrait of Blanche of Britanny
- Born: 1271
- Died: 1327 (aged 55–56)
- Noble family: Dreux
- Spouse: Philip of Artois
- Issue: Margaret, Countess of Évreux; Robert III of Artois; Isabella of Artois; Joan, Countess of Foix; Othon of Artois; Marie, Margravine of Namur; Catherine of Artois
- Father: John II, Duke of Brittany
- Mother: Beatrice of England

Blanche of Brittany (1271–1327) was a daughter of John II, Duke of Brittany, and Beatrice of England. She is also known as Blanche de Dreux. Through her mother, she was the granddaughter of King Henry III of England and Eleanor of Provence.

== Marriage and issue ==
Blanche was married in Paris sometime after November 1281 to Philip of Artois, who was the son of Robert II of Artois and Amice de Courtenay. The couple had:

- Margaret of Artois (1285–1311), married in 1301 Louis, Count of Évreux
- Robert III of Artois (1287–1342), married in 1318 Joan of Valois
- Isabella (1288–1344), a nun at Poissy
- Joan of Artois (1289 – aft. 1350), married in 1301 in Senlis, Gaston I, Count of Foix
- Othon of Artois (died 2 November 1291)
- Marie of Artois (1291 – 22 January 1365, Wijnendaele), Lady of Merode, married in 1309 in Paris John I, Marquis of Namur. She was the mother of Blanche of Namur.
- Catherine of Artois (1296–1368, Normandy), married John II of Ponthieu, Count of Aumale and had issue, a daughter Joan of Ponthieu

Blanche's husband served under his father at the Battle of Furnes, where he was wounded. He never recovered, and died of the effects over a year later. His premature death led to a legal battle later, when Artois was left to his sister Mahaut of Artois rather than his son Robert. Robert was never the proper Count of Artois, on Mahaut's death Artois passed to her daughter, Joan II, Countess of Burgundy.

Blanche's daughter Margaret was the mother of Philip III of Navarre who was married to Joan II of Navarre. Her sister, Marie was married to Guy IV, Count of Saint-Pol.

Blanche died on 19 March 1327 at the Chateau de Bois-de-Vincennes, and was buried in the now-demolished church of the Couvent des Jacobins in Paris.

== See also ==
- List of rulers of Brittany
- Artois

== Sources ==
- Crane, Mark; Raiswell, Richard; Reeves, Margaret, eds. (2004). Shell Games: Studies in Scams, Frauds, and Deceits (1300-1650). Centre for Reformation and Renaissance Studies.
- Morvan, Frederic (2009). La Chevalerie bretonne et la formation de l'armee ducale, 1260-1341 (in French). Presses Universitaires de Rennes.
