= 1335 =

1335 in various calendars
- Gregorian calendar: 1335; MCCCXXXV
- Ab urbe condita: 2088
- Armenian calendar: 784; ԹՎ ՉՁԴ
- Assyrian calendar: 6085
- Balinese saka calendar: 1256–1257
- Bengali calendar: 741–742
- Berber calendar: 2285
- English Regnal year: 8 Edw. 3 – 9 Edw. 3
- Buddhist calendar: 1879
- Burmese calendar: 697
- Byzantine calendar: 6843–6844
- Chinese calendar: 甲戌年 (Wood Dog); 4032 or 3825 — to — 乙亥年 (Wood Pig); 4033 or 3826
- Coptic calendar: 1051–1052
- Discordian calendar: 2501
- Ethiopian calendar: 1327–1328
- Hebrew calendar: 5095–5096
- Hindu calendars
- Vikram Samvat: 1391–1392
- Shaka Samvat: 1256–1257
- Kali Yuga: 4435–4436
- Holocene calendar: 11335
- Igbo calendar: 335–336
- Iranian calendar: 713–714
- Islamic calendar: 735–736
- Japanese calendar: Shōkei 4 (正慶４年)
- Javanese calendar: 1247–1248
- Julian calendar: 1335; MCCCXXXV
- Korean calendar: 3668
- Minguo calendar: 577 before ROC 民前577年
- Nanakshahi calendar: −133
- Thai solar calendar: 1877–1878
- Tibetan calendar: ཤིང་ཕོ་ཁྱི་ལོ་ (male Wood-Dog); 1461 or 1080 or 308 — to — ཤིང་མོ་ཕག་ལོ་ (female Wood-Boar); 1462 or 1081 or 309

Asia in 1335, before the disintegration of the Ilkhanate.

Year 1335 (MCCCXXXV) was a common year starting on Sunday of the Julian calendar.

== Events ==
=== January–December ===
- May 2 – Otto the Merry, Duke of Austria, becomes Duke of Carinthia.
- July 30 – Battle of Boroughmuir: John Randolph, 3rd Earl of Moray defeats Guy, Count of Namur in Scotland.
- November 30 – Battle of Culblean: David Bruce defeats Edward Balliol in Scotland.
- December 1 – Abu Sa'id Bahadur Khan dies, a victim of the plague that ravages the Ilkhanate. This is an early outbreak of the Black Death. His death without a clear heir causes the Ilkhanate to disintegrate.
- October 22 – Ex-emperor Hanazono (95th emperor of japan) becomes a Zen priest.

=== Date unknown ===
- Georgians under King George V (the Brilliant) finally defeat the Mongolians in a decisive battle. After that George V returns the Grave of Christ from the Muslims.
- Slavery is abolished in Sweden.
- Congress of Visegrád: The monarchs of Bohemia, Hungary, and Poland form an anti-Habsburg alliance.
- Carinthia and Carniola come under Habsburg rule. After the death of Duke Henry, the duchies are bestowed by Louis the Bavarian on the Dukes of Austria. From that time onwards, what is today Slovenia is ruled jointly with Austria until 1918.
- Pope Benedict XII begins to reform the Cistercians.
- The excommunication of Frederick III of Sicily and the interdict placed on Sicily end.
- Construction begins on the papal palace in Avignon.
- Aabenraa is chartered as a city.
- The School of Arts in Zaragoza, Spain is founded (later known as the University of Zaragoza in the 16th Century).

== Births ==
- May 24 – Margaret of Bohemia, Queen of Hungary (d. 1349)
- October 27 – Yi Seong-gye, Korean founder of the Joseon Dynasty
- Gülçiçek Hatun, first wife of Ottoman Sultan Murad I
- Marko Mrnjavčević, de jure Serbian king
- Milica, wife of Prince Lazar of Serbia (d. 1405)
- Tiphaine Raguenel, Breton astrologer (d. 1373)

== Deaths ==
- April 2 – Duke Henry of Carinthia
- August 12 – Prince Moriyoshi, Japanese shōgun (b. 1308)
- August 23 – Heilwige Bloemardinne, Dutch Christian mystic (b. c. 1265)
- October 31 – Marie of Évreux, French noblewoman (b. 1303)
- December 1 – Abu Sa'id Bahadur Khan, Mongol ruler of the Ilkhanate (b. 1305)
