= Patrick V, Earl of March =

Scottish nobleman

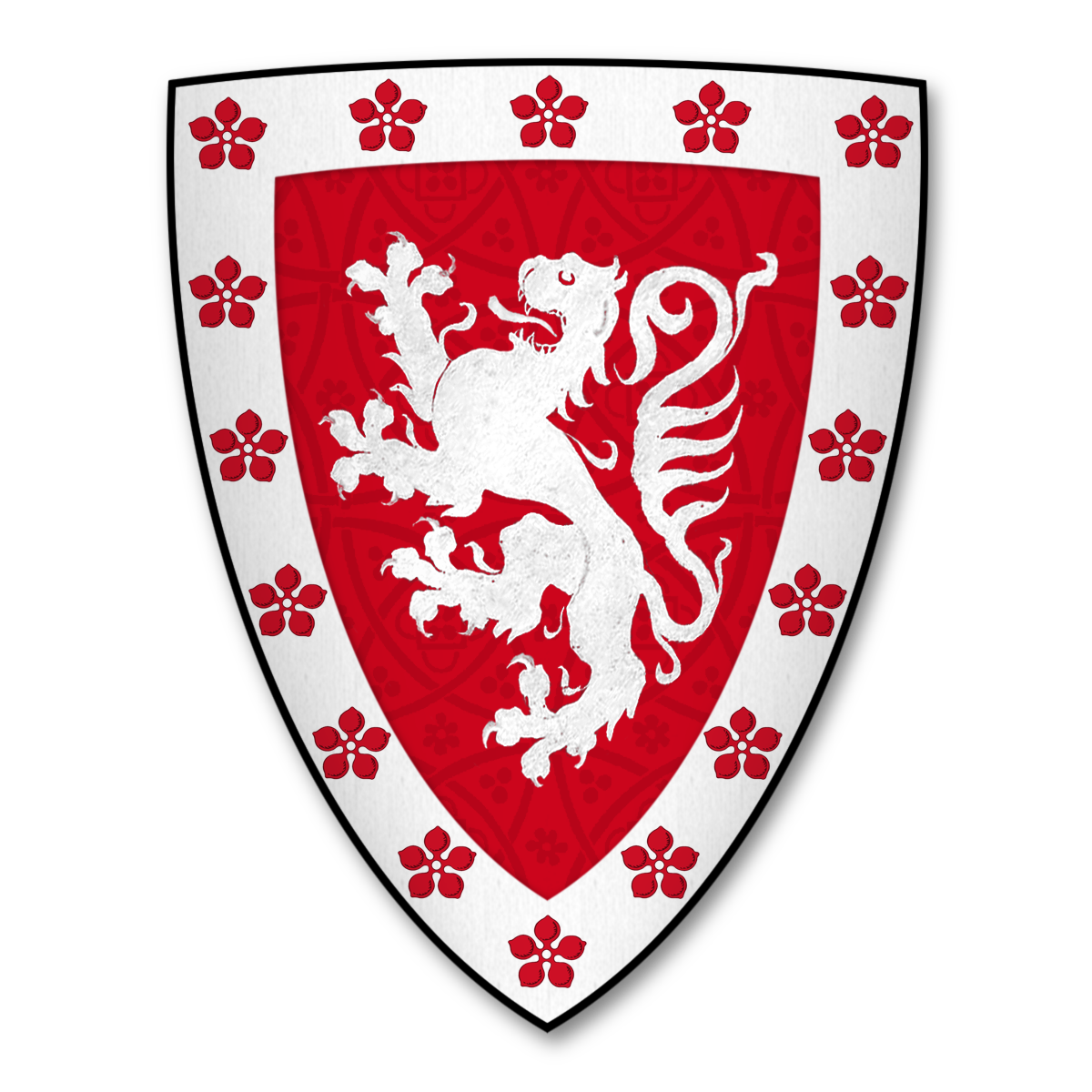
Arms of the Earl of March

Patrick de Dunbar, 9th Earl of March, (c. 1285–1369) was a prominent Scottish magnate during the reigns of Robert the Bruce and David II.

== Early years ==
The earldom, located in East Lothian, and known interchangeably by the names Dunbar and March (so-called Northumbrian or Scottish March), was one of the successor fiefs of Northumbria, an Anglo-Saxon kingdom and later earldom. The Dunbar family descended from one branch of ancient earls of Northumbria, specifically from a branch which also had Scottish royal blood.

He is said to have been aged 24 in 1309 at the death of his father, Patrick, 8th Earl of March, who had been one of the Competitors for the Crown of Scotland in 1291. The 8th Earl's purported wife, Marjory, daughter of Alexander Comyn, Earl of Buchan, was also descended from King Donald III.

== Bannockburn to Durham ==
After the Battle of Bannockburn, Patrick de Dunbar gave sanctuary and quarter to the English King Edward II at the fortress of Dunbar Castle, on the east coast of Scotland between Edinburgh and Berwick-upon-Tweed, and managed to effect the king's escape by means of a fishing boat whereby that monarch was transported back to England. The earl afterwards made his peace with his cousin Robert the Bruce, and was present at the parliament held at Ayr on 26 April 1315, when the succession to the Crown of Scotland was settled.

In 1318 he assisted in retaking Berwick-upon-Tweed from the English, at which time he is noted as Sheriff of Lothian. In 1320 he was one of those nobles who signed the Declaration of Arbroath sent to Pope John XXII asserting the independence of Scotland.

Laing relates a charter of a Precept originally written in Norman French by Patrick de Dunbar, Earl of March, to Sir Robert Lauder of Quarrelwood, for heritable sasine of the reversion of the lands of Whitelaw within the Earldom of Dunbar, plus 10 livres yearly from the mill of Dunbar, and the farms and issues of the granter's said town (ville) of Dunbar, according to the terms of charters to the grantee. Dated at Berwick-upon-Tweed, 20 October 1324.

Sometime after 1331 the Bishop of Durham complained to the Regency in Scotland that the village of Upsettlington, on the Scottish side of the River Tweed west of Norham, belonged to the See of Durham and not the Earl of Dunbar, who had seized it. The King of England now became involved also and it appears the lands were restored to the Bishop.

In 1332, the Earl of Dunbar was appointed by the assembly of the estates (Parliament) at Perth, joint Guardian of the Crown, upon the death of the Regent, Thomas Randolph, 1st Earl of Moray. He opposed Edward Balliol in several battles and skirmishes following the Battle of Dupplin Moor. In January 1333 he was appointed Governor of Berwick Castle but was forced to surrender it following the Battle of Halidon Hill in July 1333. The Earl of Dunbar and several others of the nobility paid fealty to King Edward. The Earl attended Edward Balliol at the parliament held at Edinburgh in February 1334 when they ceded to England Berwick, Dunbar, Roxburgh, and Edinburgh, as well as all the southern counties of Scotland. Earl Patrick had had his castle levelled to the ground, but Edward III of England now compelled him to rebuild the fortress at his own expense and garrisoned it with English troops. Dunbar castle was not restored to the Earl until 1338.

In 1335, when King Edward III and Baliol had made another attack upon the Scots, the Earl cut off a body of archers on their return southward, and afterwards assisted John Randolph, 3rd Earl of Moray in defeating the Count of Namur at the Battle of Boroughmuir close to Edinburgh.

In 1339, the Earl of Dunbar assisted the High Steward of Scotland, in the reduction of Perth, where he led the second division of the army. In 1340 he and the Earl of Sutherland were routed by Sir Thomas Grey and Sir Robert Manners, assisted by John Copeland and the English garrison of Roxburgh Castle, during border skirmishes. Patrick, Earl of Dunbar, had a Safe-Conduct dated 24 March 1342, from Westminster, in order to travel to England.

Patrick, Earl of Dunbar, commanded the right of the Scottish army in the Battle of Neville's Cross, near Durham. From this disaster the Earl escaped, with considerable losses, which included his wife's brother, John Randolph, 3rd Earl of Moray. However, other accounts including that of The Chronicle of Lanercost and Bower's Scotichronicon relate that Dunbar retreated without engaging the English and with no losses. It is unlikely that Dunbar remained to fight after the first arrows reached them.

In 1355, with William, Lord of Douglas and Sir William Ramsay of Dalhousie, the Earl of Dunbar again invaded Northumberland, and subsequently recovered Berwick-upon-Tweed, although not the castle. In 1357 he was one of the Scottish ambassadors who met at Berwick to discuss the liberation of King David, who had been taken prisoner at Neville's Cross. He was subsequently one of the hostages for David until the ransom was paid, although it would appear from Safe-Conducts that he was out and about thereafter. Following this his town of Dunbar was erected into a Royal Burgh.

In 1366, he made a pilgrimage to the shrine of St. Thomas Becket at Canterbury. In May 1367 he confirmed to the monks of Coldingham Priory by charter to the Prior and Convent of Durham, the church and manor of Edrom, and Nisbet, with the agreement of his wife.

In June 1368, the King was advised by parliament at Scone to consult with the Earls of Dunbar and Douglas on the security of the Eastern marches. He was not present at the Coronation of King Robert II in 1371 so it is assumed that he died before then. Brown gives a year of death as 1368. If that is so it would probably be 1368/9.

== Marriage ==
Patrick Dunbar is not as well remembered as his second wife Agnes Randolph, also known as Black Agnes of Dunbar who died just a few months before him. From her brothers she obtained by inheritance the Isle of Man, the Lordship of Annandale (which she brought to her marriage), and the feudal baronies of Morton and Tibbers in Nithsdale, Mordington (where she is buried), Longformacus, and Duns, in Berwickshire; Mochrum in Galloway, Cumnock in Ayrshire, and Blantyre in Clydesdale.

Preceded by Patrick IV	Earl of March (or Dunbar); 1308–1369	Succeeded by George I
