= Marie of Artois =

Marchioness of Namur

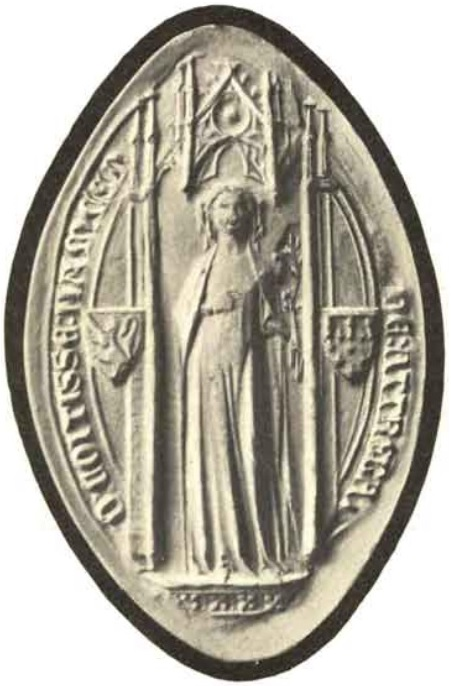
- Seal of Marie of Artois (12 October 1331).
- Born: 1291
- Died: 22 January 1365 (aged 73–74); Wijnendaele, Flanders
- Noble family: Artois
- Spouse: John I, Marquis of Namur
- Issue: John II, Marquis of Namur; Guy II, Marquis of Namur; Henry of Namur; Philip III, Marquis of Namur; Blanche, Queen of Sweden and Norway; Marie of Namur; Margaret of Namur; William I, Marquis of Namur; Robert of Namur; Louis of Namur; Elizabeth, Electress Palatine
- Father: Philip of Artois
- Mother: Blanche of Brittany

Marie of Artois (1291-1365) was the margravine of Namur in 1310-1330 by marriage to John I. She was the regent of Namur during the minority of her son William I in 1337-1340.

She became the lady of Méraude (Merode) when she purchased it from King John of Bohemia in 1342, until she left it to her son William I in 1353.

== Life ==
She was the fourth daughter of Philip of Artois and Blanche of Brittany.

Marie married Marquis John I of Namur. They were married by contract in Paris on 6 March 1310, confirmed in Poissy in January 1313. John granted her as dower the castle of Wijnendale in Flanders, ratified by John's half-brother Count Robert III of Flanders in 1313.

She became a widow in 1330.

In 1337, her youngest fifth son became marquis. Since he was fifteen and a minor, she became regent of Namur until her reached his majority.

== Issue ==
Name	Lifespan	Notes
John of Namur; Marquis of Namur	1310/12 - 2 April 1335	Succeeded his father in 1330 as John II, Marquis of Namur. Buried at Kloster Spaltheim.
Guy of Namur; Marquis of Namur	1311/13 - 12 March 1336	Succeeded his brother in 1335 as Guy II, Marquis of Namur.
Henry of Namur	1312/13 – 8 October 1333	Canon at Chartres Cathedral; canon at Cambrai Cathedral, 1324; canon at Châlons-sur-Marne and Reims, 1325.
Philip of Namur; Marquis of Namur	1319 - September 1337	Succeeded his brother in 1336 as Philip III, Marquis of Namur. Murdered at Famagusta, Cyprus.
Blanche of Namur; Queen consort of Sweden and Norway	1320 - autumn 1363	She was accused by the noblewoman Birgitta Birgersdatter (Saint Bridget of Sweden) of having poisoned the latter's son, her innocence of the crime only being proved at the end of the 18th century. She lived at Tønsberghus castle in Norway from 1358, because of the political situation in Sweden, and administered the fiefs of Vestfold and Skienssysla. Married 5 November 1335 at Bohus Castle Magnus IV of Sweden. He was deposed in 1355 as King of Norway, and in 1364 as King of Sweden.
Marie of Namur; Gräfin von Vianden; Dame de Pierrepont	1322 - before 29 October 1357	Married firstly, in 1335/36, Henry II, Graf of Vianden, son of Philip II, Graf of Vianden and his first wife Lucia von der Neuerburg. Her first husband was murdered at Famagusta in September 1337. Married secondly (1340, dispensation 9 September 1342) her father's second cousin, Theobald of Bar, Seigneur de Pierrepont, son of Erard of Bar, Seigneur de Pierrepont et d'Ancerville (himself son of Theobald II of Bar), and his wife Isabelle of Lorraine (daughter of Theobald II, Duke of Lorraine).
Margaret of Namur	1323 - 13 September 1383	A nun at Peteghem.
William of Namur; Marquis of Namur	1324 - 1 October 1391	Succeeded his brother in 1337 as William I "the Rich", Marquis of Namur. Buried at the Franciscan convent in Namur. Father of William II, Marquis of Namur, and John III, Marquis of Namur, who sold Namur to Philip the Good.
Robert of Namur; Seigneur de Beaufort-sur-Meuse et de Renaix	1325 - 1/29 April 1391	Seigneur de Beaufort-sur-Meuse et de Renaix; Marshal of Brabant. Married firstly (dispensation 18 October 1354) Isabelle of Hainault, sister of Philippa of Hainault, daughter of William III, Count of Hainault and his wife Joan of Valois. Married secondly (4 February 1380) as her first husband, Isabeau de Melun, heiress of Viane, daughter of Hugues de Melun, Seigneur d'Antoing (died 1409). Robert had two illegitimate children by unknown mistresses.
Louis of Namur; Seigneur de Peteghem et de Bailleul	1325 - 1378/86	Seigneur de Peteghem et de Bailleul. Flemish counsellor. Governor of Namur 1351. Married on 17 May 1365 Isabelle de Roucy, Dame de Roucy, daughter and heiress of Robert II, Count of Roucy and his wife Marie d'Enghien (-after 1396).
Elizabeth of Namur; Electress Palatine	1329 - 29 March 1382	Married Rupert I, Elector Palatine, in autumn 1350 or summer 1358. Died without children in Heidelberg.
