= Amicie =

Amicie is a French feminine given name.

== People with the name ==
- Amicie de Courtenay
- Amicie de Montfort
