= Philip of Artois =

French nobleman (1269–1298)

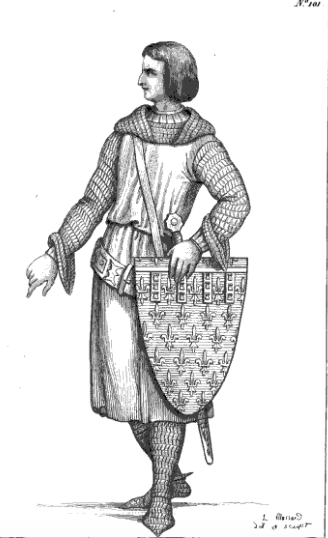
- A portrait of Philip
- Born: November 1269
- Died: September 11, 1298 (aged 28)
- Buried: Couvent des Jacobins de la rue Saint-Jacques, Paris
- Wars and battles: Franco-Flemish War; Battle of Furnes (WIA) (DOW)
- Noble family: Artois
- Spouse: Blanche of Brittany
- Issue: Margaret, Countess of Évreux; Robert III of Artois; Isabella of Artois; Joan, Countess of Foix; Othon of Artois; Marie, Margravine of Namur; Catherine of Artois
- Father: Robert II of Artois
- Mother: Amicie de Courtenay

Philip of Artois (November 1269 – 11 September 1298), Lord of Conches, Nonancourt, and Domfront, was the son of Robert II, Count of Artois, and Amicie de Courtenay, daughter of Peter, Lord of Conches and Mehun.

== Life and career ==
Philip's date of birth is unknown, his parents married in 1262 so he was probably 18 years old in 1284. On 15 August 1284, Philip was knighted along with two of King Philip III's sons, Philip IV of France and Charles, Count of Valois. Funds had been raised from the residents of Artois for Philip's knighthood, sometime after All Saints' Day 1284. Now married and knighted, Philip inherited the large estates of his mother, namely Conches-en-Ouche and Nonancourt in Normandy, and Mehun-sur-Yèvre in Berry. The distribution of his mother's estates led to a long-drawn dispute between Philip and his sister Mahaut, and in 1296, their father had to intervene to resolve their issues. Philip probably took part in the 1285 Aragonese Crusade, as recorded in the French royal archives. During the end of Philip III's reign, Philip and his brother Robert claimed the estate of their maternal grandmother Perronelle de Joigny. Her eldest son from her second marriage to Henri de Sully, John de Sully, had no male heirs, and the Artois brothers claimed the share of the other Sully brothers. On Candlemas 1291, a Parlement court granted one-fourth of John de Sully's estate to the Artois brothers, but Robert had died by then, so Philip received the entire share.

Philip had some properties and revenues in various regions of France, but he was still financially dependent on his father, who paid him a pension of 3,000 and then 5,000 livres parisis. King Philip IV also started paying Philip a pension of 2,000 livres tournois, with the earliest payment dating to October 1297. This pension was probably paid to compensate Philip for the wounds he incurred at the Battle of Furnes, or because the Artois counts were granted a peerage after the battle. Philip probably maintained diplomatic channels with England, as King Edward I of England was his wife's maternal uncle. In 1291, Philip sent one of his companions, the castellan of Bapaume, to England to meet the king.

The Artois counts had good relations with the Popes. Pope Nicholas IV granted special privileges to clerics chosen by Philip and his wife. His wife was also allowed to visit multiple female monasteries four times a year, if she went with six female companions and wore appropriate attire. Pope Boniface VIII, the successor of Nicholas IV, granted further exceptional privileges to Philip and his wife. Philip couldn't be excommunicated without approval from the Holy See, he was permitted to establish two chapels every year and endow them, he and his wife could choose their own confessor. On 30 April 1295, the day of this order, his wife was allowed to carry a personal altar and visit monasteries. On 9 July 1297, the above privileges were confirmed and reiterated; Philip's confessor was now allowed to release him from all of his vows except the vows of religion and crusades. One of Pope Boniface VIII's confidants, the prior of Chézy, claimed he had told the Pope Philip and Jacques de Châtillon were his primary enemies in 1296. The prior said he named these two prominent knights because they were not fearful of the Pope's vindictiveness.

=== Military career ===
During the Franco-Flemish War, Philip was initially charged with getting the town of Béthune to surrender. At this time, the town was held by Robert III, Count of Flanders, the eldest son and heir of Guy, Count of Flanders. Robert, Philip's father, then arrived in Lille with a large army to invade West Flanders. Philip accompanied them to Saint-Omer and then to Furnes. The Flemish army had encamped at Ypres under the command of William of Jülich. On 20 August, the two armies fought at Bulskamp, about 2 kilometres (1.2 mi) from Furnes. According to the account of French chronicler Geoffrey of Paris, Philip had almost been captured by an unnamed German commander when he was rescued by his father, Miles de Noyers, and the chamberlain of Tancarville. According to another French chronicler, Guillaume Guiart, Robert had charged his son with commanding the rear guard; however, an eager Philip had rushed to fight a few Germans, and then a rumor spread of Philip's capture. Robert had to intervene and save his son. Guillaume Guiart had fought in the war on the French side from the contingent sent by the city of Orléans. It is possible Guiart related the battlefield accounts he had heard.

Another source, the 15th-century Ancient Chronicle of Flanders, offers a slightly different version of events. According to this source, one French corps was commanded by Robert, another by Simon de Melun (a Marshal of France), and the rear guard led by Philip and Robert VI of Auvergne, the Count of Boulogne. The Flemish army almost achieved tactical surprise against the French army, and Simon de Melun appealed to Robert as he was being outnumbered. Philip arrived first at the scene as he was closer, and was captured by the Flemish, who were taking him to Furnes when his father rescued him. Philip's raw audacity on the battlefield, which led to his capture, is said to be a family trait.

== Family ==
He married Blanche of Brittany, the daughter of John II, Duke of Brittany, in November 1281, probably at the Church of Saint-Eustache, Paris. The couple had the following children:

- Margaret (1285–1311), married Louis, Count of Évreux in 1301.
- Robert III (1287–1342), his heir
- Isabelle (1288–1344), who became a nun at Poissy.
- Joan (1289–aft. 1350), married Gaston I, Count of Foix in Senlis in 1301
- Othon (died 2 November 1291). Othon was buried at Royaumont Abbey, which was built for the burial of royal children who hadn't ruled; this further cements Philip's status as a member of the royal family.
- Marie (1291–22 January 1365, Wijnendaele), Lady of Merode, married John I, Marquis of Namur in Paris in 1309
- Catherine (1296–1368, Normandy), married John II, Count of Aumale

== Death and succession ==
Philip never recovered from his battlefield injuries and died over a year later, on 11 September 1298. He died exactly one year after the canonization of his grand-uncle, King Louis IX of France, by Pope Boniface VIII on 11 August 1297. The Imperial Treasury provided 200 livres to the king's chaplain for distributing alms in honor of Philip. He was buried in the now-demolished church of the Couvent des Jacobins in Paris, as per his will. His premature death led to a legal battle following the death of his father in 1302, who had left the County of Artois to his elder sister Mahaut, instead of his eldest son Robert.
