= Adam de Gordon, Lord of Gordon =

Scottish statesman and soldier

Adam Gordon
- Baron Gordon of Gordon
- Born: 1273
- Died: 12 July 1333 (aged 59–60); Battle of Halidon Hill
- Father: Adam Gordon
- Mother: Marjory

Sir Adam de Gordon (1273–1333), lord of Gordon, was a Scottish statesman and soldier.

== Ancestry ==
Gordon was the son and heir of Adam de Gordon of Gordon in Berwickshire. His great-grandfather, likewise Adam de Gordon, was the younger son of an Anglo-Norman nobleman who came to Scotland in the time of David I, and settled on a tract of land called Gordon, within sight of the English border. The second Sir Adam, grandfather of the fourth Sir Adam, married Alicia, only child and heiress of Thomas de Gordon, who represented the elder branch of the family, and by this alliance the whole estates were united into one property. His son William de Gordon was one of the Scottish nobles who in 1268 joined Louis IX of France in his crusade for the recovery of the holy sepulchre, and died during the expedition. He was succeeded by his brother, the third Sir Adam, who died on 3 Sept. 1296, and was succeeded by his son, the fourth Sir Adam.

== Career ==
=== Support for King Edward I and II ===
An historian of the Gordon family says that this last Sir Adam joined Sir William Wallace in 1297, and the statement is accepted by Lord Hailes as correct. It is probably true, as the English estates were forfeited at that time, but were recovered by Marjory, mother of Gordon, who submitted to the English rule and brought to her son a great inheritance on both sides of the border. The year 1303 was spent by Edward I in Scotland. On his return to England he carried with him certain sons of the nobles as hostages, and Gordon followed as a deputy with power to arrange for the pacification of the country.

About 1300, Gordon confirmed several charters granted by his predecessors to the abbey of Kelso. The earliest of these was granted by Richard de Gordon, elder son of the founder of the family, previous to 1180. In 1308 there was a formally dated agreement between the monks of Kelso and Sir Adam Gordon, knight, regarding some lands in the village of Gordon, given to them by Andrew Fraser about 1280.

After the coronation of Robert Bruce and the accession of Edward II to the English throne, certain Scottish noblemen continued 'deeply engaged in the English interest', among whom Abercrombie mentions with sorrow 'the formerly brave and honest Sir Adam Gordon'. However, it was Gordon who prevented by unknown arguments the execution of King Robert's nephew, Thomas Randolph, 1st Earl of Moray. Randolph was given to Gordon to imprison at his castle with orders that Randolph was not to be given parol but within the year Randolph was taken to England where he made peace with the English King.

Until 1314 Gordon was well disposed toward the English king, from whom he received various marks of favour. In 1308, when William Lamberton, bishop of St. Andrews, who had been imprisoned by Edward I, was liberated by his successor, Gordon with others became surety for his compliance with the conditions of his release. In 1310 he was appointed justiciar of Scotland. In January 1312 Edward II was at York, on his way to invade Scotland, but resolved to treat for peace, and for that purpose appointed David, earl of Atholl, Gordon, and others his plenipotentiaries, but without any good result. In October 1313 Gordon, along with Patrick, earl of March, was deputed by such of the Scots as still remained faithful to the English interest to lay before Edward their miserable condition. The king received them graciously, and on 28 November formally replied, announcing his intention to lead an army to their relief next midsummer. In a letter dated 1 April the same year Edward warmly commended to the pope John and Thomas, sons of ‘a nobleman and our faithful Adam Gordon,’ who seem to have been about to visit Italy.

=== Support for Robert Bruce ===
After the battle of Bannockburn in 1314, Gordon no longer hesitated to acknowledge Bruce as king. He was cordially welcomed, and was speedily numbered with the king's most trusted friends. From Thomas Randolph, Earl of Moray, he obtained the barony of Stitchel in Roxburghshire, which was confirmed to him and his son William by Robert I on 28 January 1315. In 1320 Gordon, along with Sir Edward Mabinson, was sent on a special mission to the pope at Avignon. They were bearers of the memorable letter asserting the independence of the kingdom, dated at Aberbrothock on 6 April 1320, and were charged with the twofold duty of effecting a reconciliation between King Robert and the pope and paving the way for a peace with England. Although the letter seems to have well received by the pope, it did not achieve its intended purpose of convincing the pope to recognise Robert as King of the Scots. As a reward for faithful service, including help rendered in subduing the rebellious house of Comyn in the north-eastern counties, Bruce granted to him and his heirs the lordship of Strathbogie in Aberdeenshire, which had belonged to David, earl of Atholl. Gordon bestowed on that lordship the name of Huntly, from a village on his Berwickshire estate.

During the uneasy first few years of Scottish independence, Gordon led one hundred and sixty men-at-arms to steal the cattle outside of Norham Castle. After a bloody skirmish they were driven away by the castle's Constable, Sir Thomas Grey of Heaton.

Adam's fidelity to King Robert was continued to his son and successor, David II; and he was killed on 12 July 1333, fighting in the van of the Scottish army at the Battle of Halidon Hill. By Abercrombie he is numbered among the most trusted friends of Bruce, ‘all great personages and the glorious ancestors of many in all respects as great as themselves.’
