= Theobald of Bar, Seigneur de Pierrepont =

Theobald of Bar
- Born: c. 1314; Namur
- Died: c. 1354
- Noble family: House of Bar
- Spouse: Marie de Namur
- Issue: Yolande of Bar; Elisabeth de Bar
- Father: Erard of Bar
- Mother: Isabella of Loraine

Theobald of Bar (French: Thibauld/Thiebaut de Bar), Seigneur of Pierrepont (Meurthe-et-Moselle). He was one of six children born to Erard of Bar, Seigneur de Pierrepont et d'Ancerville (himself son of Theobald II of Bar), and Isabelle of Lorraine (daughter of Theobald II, Duke of Lorraine).

In 1340, he married Marie de Namur (daughter of John I, of Dampierre and Marie of Artois), after her first husband Henry II, Graf of Vianden was murdered at Famagusta three years before. His wife, Marie gave birth to two daughters, Yolande and Elisabeth. When Theobald, died (between 2 August 1353 and 6 July 1354) he had no legitimate male heir, thus his daughter Elisabeth became the heiress of Bar-Pierrepont.

== Issue ==
- Yolande de Bar (b. c. 1343 - d. c. 1410) married before 1360 with Eudes VII, Sire de Grancey, Louvois, Pierrepont.
- Elisabeth (Isabel) de Bar (b. c 1345 - d. before 11 May 1411) married before 18 Oct 1360 with Otto, Lord of Arkel.
