= Agnes, Countess of Dunbar =

Scottish noblewoman

Agnes Randolph
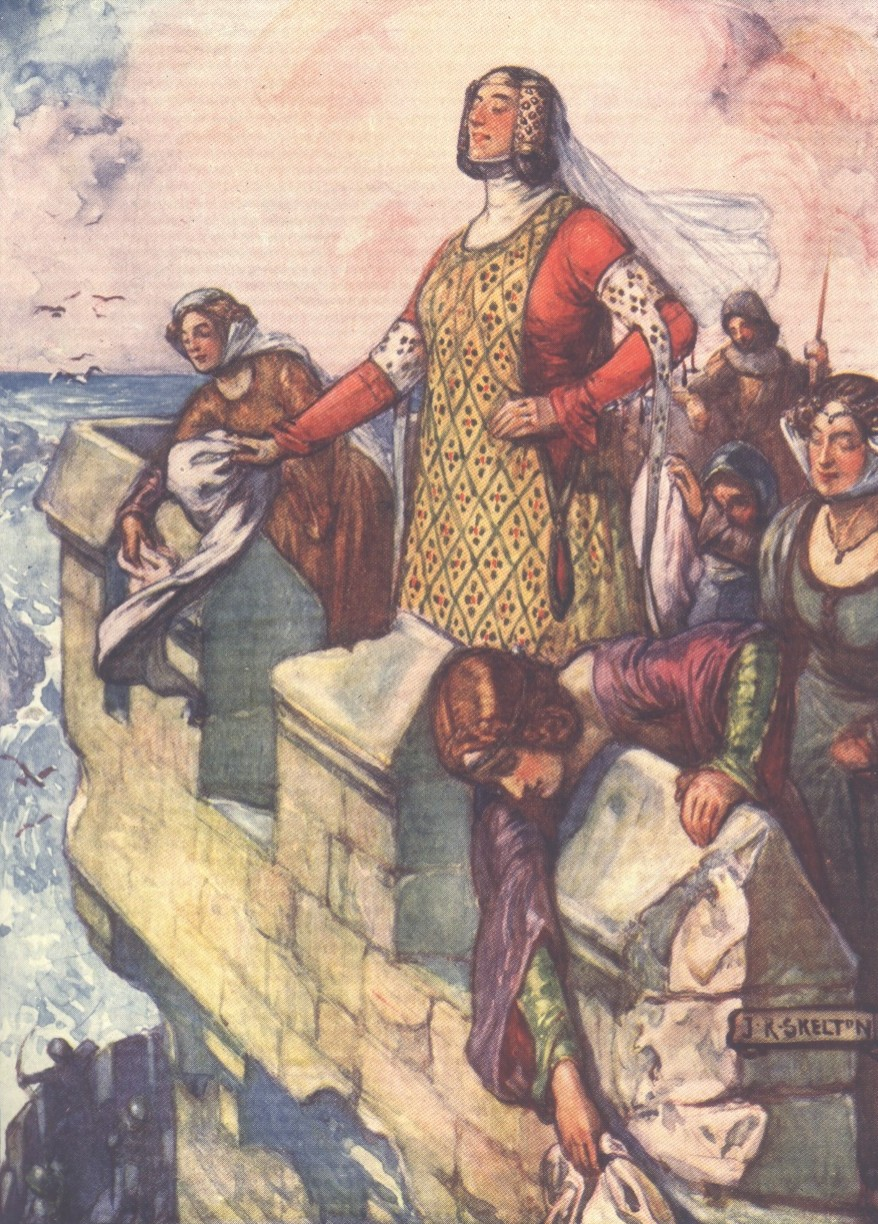
- Black Agnes, as depicted in a children's history book from 1906
- Born: c. 1312; Scotland
- Died: 1369 (aged about 57)
- Buried: Mordington, Berwickshire
- Noble family: Randolph
- Spouse: Patrick, Earl of March
- Father: Thomas Randolph, Earl of Moray
- Mother: Isabel Stewart of Bonkyll

Agnes Randolph, Countess of Dunbar and March (c. 1312 – 1369), known as Black Agnes for her dark complexion, was the wife of Patrick, 9th Earl of Dunbar and March. She is buried in the vault near Mordington House. She was the daughter of Thomas Randolph, Earl of Moray, nephew and companion-in-arms of Robert the Bruce, and Moray's wife, Isabel Stewart, herself a daughter of John Stewart of Bonkyll. Agnes is best known for her defence of Dunbar Castle in East Lothian against an English siege led by William Montagu, 1st Earl of Salisbury, which began on 13 January 1338 and ended on 10 June the same year during the Second War of Scottish Independence from 1331 to 1357.

== Siege of Dunbar ==
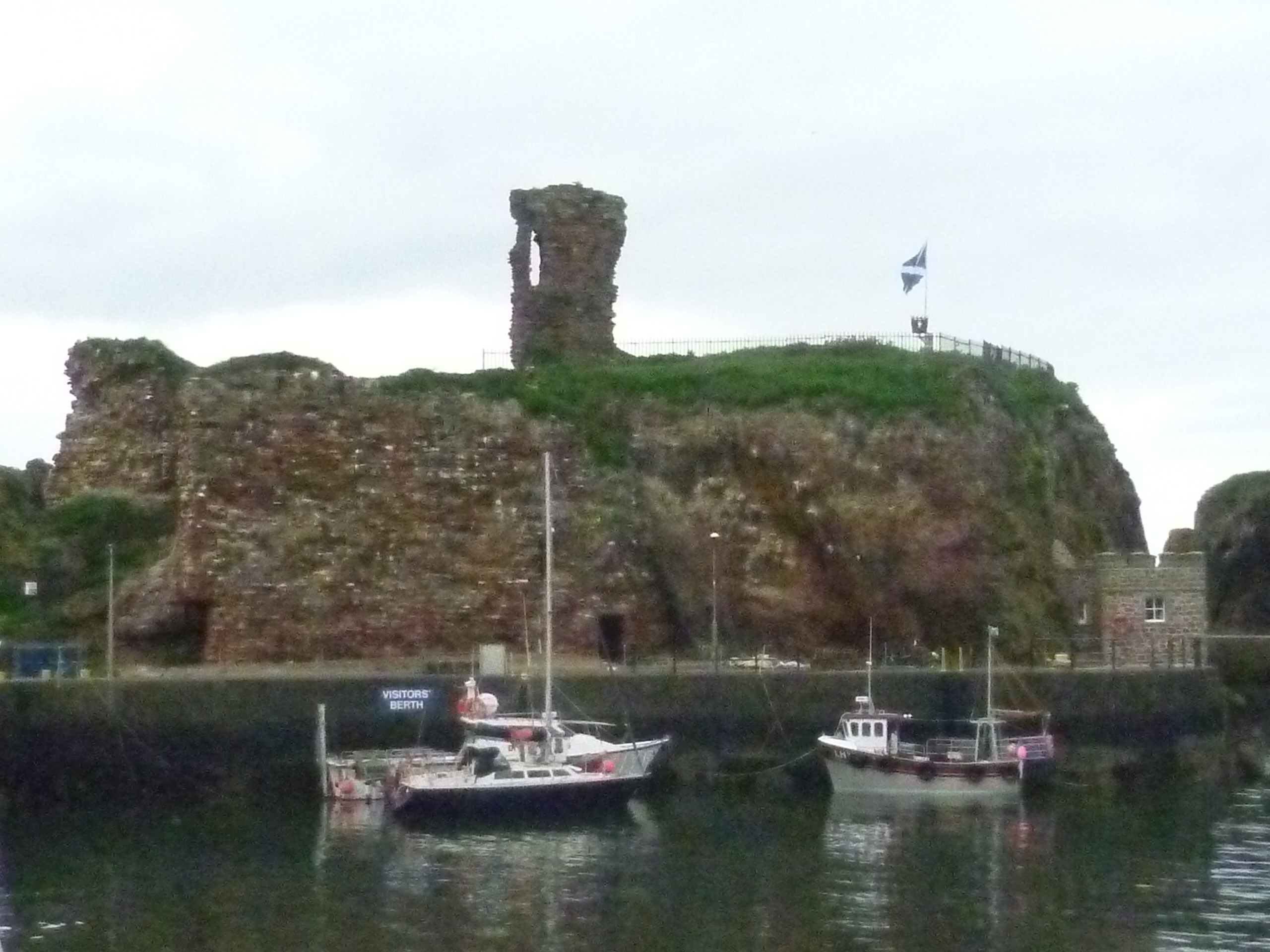
Ruins of Dunbar Castle

On 13 January 1338, when Patrick Dunbar was away, the English laid siege to Dunbar Castle, where the Countess was in residence with her servants and guards. However, she was determined not to surrender the fortress and is said to have declared:

Of Scotland's King I haud my house, I pay him meat and fee, And I will keep my gude auld house, while my house will keep me.

During the Middle Ages, it was the norm for a wife to take charge of a castle and manor business in her husband's absence and defend it if need be, but the stand of the Countess of Dunbar is one of the best remembered instances. Salisbury's first attempt at taking the castle centred on catapulting huge rocks and lead shot against the ramparts, but this proved ineffective, and the Countess had one of her ladies-in-waiting dust off the ramparts with her kerchief to taunt the besiegers.

The English then employed a siege structure called a sow in an attempt to bypass the castle's defences. The Countess responded by informing Salisbury that he should "take good care of his sow, for she would soon cast her pigs [meaning his men] within the fortress." She then ordered that a boulder, which had been heaved on them earlier, be thrown down from the battlements and crushed Salisbury's sow to pieces. When a Scottish archer fired an arrow at an English soldier standing next to Salisbury, the earl cried out, "There comes one of my lady's tire pins; Agnes's love shafts go straight to the heart."

Unable to make progress through force of arms, Salisbury turned to bribery. He bribed the Scottish soldier who guarded the principal entrance, advising him to leave the gate unlocked or to leave it in such a manner that the English could easily break in. However, the soldier, though he took Salisbury's money, reported the offer to Agnes, who was ready for the English when they made entry. Although Salisbury was in the lead, one of his men pushed past him just at the moment when Agnes's men lowered the portcullis, separating him from the rest of the attacking force. Agnes, of course, had meant to trap Salisbury, but she moved from stratagem to taunt, shouting at the earl, "Farewell, Montague, I intended that you should have supped with us, and assist us in defending the Castle against the English."

At one point, the English having taken her brother John prisoner, he was brought to Dunbar and Montague threatened to hang him if the Countess did not surrender the castle. However, she merely responded that his death would only benefit her, as she was his heir. She was not in line for the earldom but was the heir to his lands along with her sister. When supplies for her garrison began to run low after several months being cut off, Scottish commander Sir Alexander Ramsay of Dalhousie moved from Edinburgh to the coast with 40 men. Appropriating some boats, Ramsay and his company approached the castle by the sea and entered the postern next to the sea. Charging out of the castle, the defenders surprised Salisbury's advance guard and pushed them all the way back to their camp.

After five months, Salisbury admitted defeat and lifted the siege on 10 June 1338. A ballad was subsequently composed celebrating the Countess' victory, in which Salisbury says:

Cam I early, cam I late, I found Agnes at the gate.

The siege had cost the English nearly 6,000 pounds. For centuries afterwards, Agnes Randolph's defence of Dunbar Castle was recorded in the works of contemporary chroniclers and Scottish historians.

== Family ==
Some accounts describe her as Countess of Moray, on the assumption that she inherited the earldom when her brother John was killed at the Battle of Neville's Cross in 1346. However, the earldom actually reverted to the crown. But in 1371/2, Agnes' nephew, John Dunbar, was created Earl of Moray by Robert II, his father-in-law.

Many of Agnes's family members also fought in the Scottish Wars of Independence. Her father, Thomas Randolph, Earl of Moray, was appointed regent from 1329 to 1332. Agnes's brother became joint regent in 1335, but was captured by the English shortly afterwards. In 1324, Agnes married Patrick, ninth Earl of Dunbar and March, governor of Berwick. After the Scottish defeat at the Battle of Halidon Hill, Patrick surrendered Berwick to the English and defected to them. He was ordered by the English to refortify Dunbar Castle; however, by the following year, Patrick had defected back to the Scots, engaging in operations against English forces. It seems that there were no surviving children of the marriage between Agnes and the earl. Their estates were left to children of the marriage between the earl's cousin John de Dunbar of Derchester and Birkynside, and his wife, Isobel Randolph, Agnes' younger sister.

The three nephews were:

- George, Earl of Dunbar and March
- John Dunbar, Earl of Moray
- Sir Patrick de Dunbar, of Beil

She also had a ward, Agnes Dunbar, who became mistress of King David II.

== Bibliography ==
- Chicago, Judy. (2007). The Dinner Party: From Creation to Preservation. London: Merrell. ISBN 1-85894-370-1.
- Vian, Alsager Richard (1888). "Dunbar, Agnes". In Stephen, Leslie (ed.). Dictionary of National Biography. Vol. 16. London: Smith, Elder & Co. p. 150-151.
- Douglas and Wood's Peerage of Scotland, ii. 169, 170;
- Boece and Stewart's Buik of the Croniclis of Scotland (Rolls Ser.), ed. Turnbull, iii. 341;
- Exchequer Rolls of Scotland, ii. 654, and pref. pp. lxiii, lxxv n.;
- Burke's Dormant and Extinct Peerage;
- Ridpath's Border History (1776), p. 325;
- Burton's Hist. of Scotland, ii. 324, Keith's Bishops of Scotland, p. 143;
- information from Capt. A. H. Dunbar
