= Dunbar Castle =

Fortress overlooking the harbour of Dunbar, Scotland

- Dunbar, East Lothian, Scotland
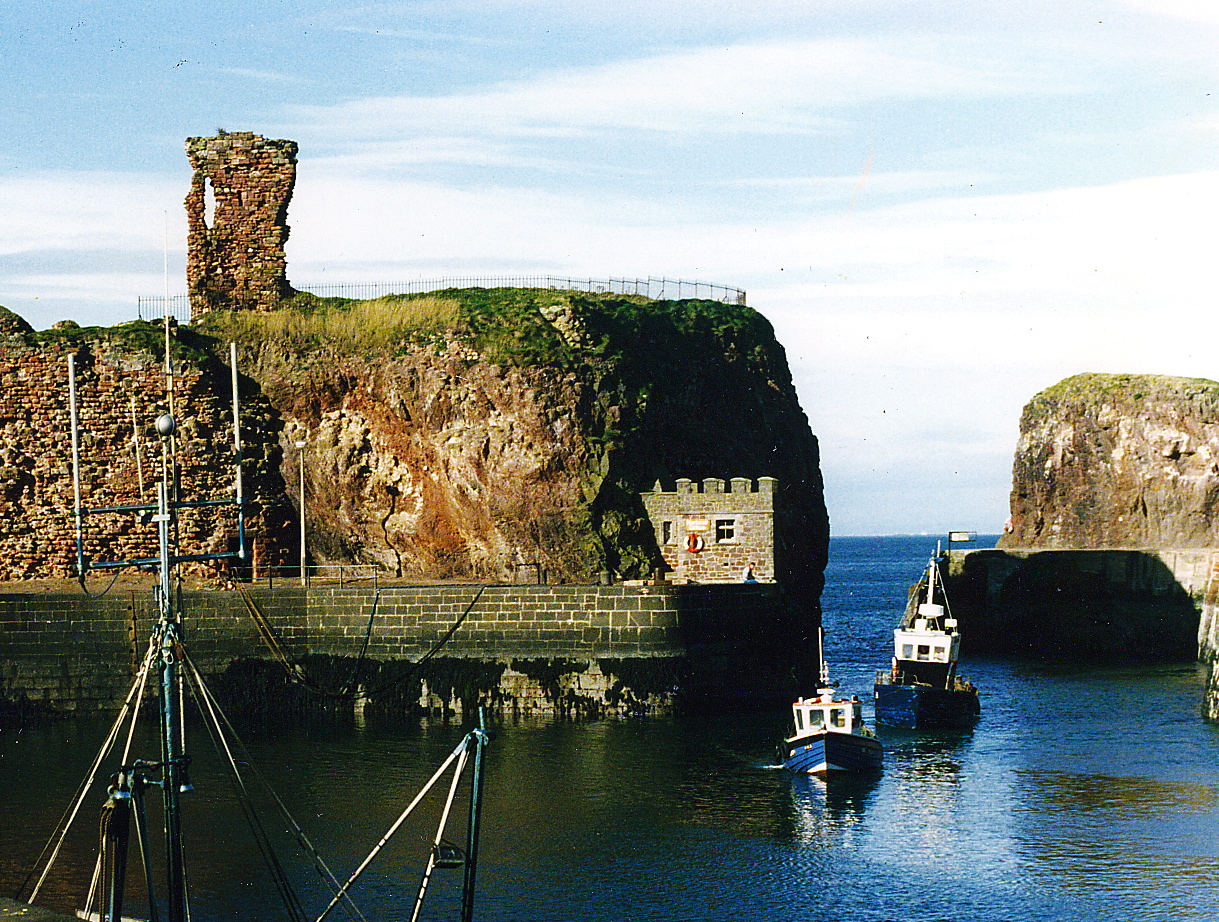
- Dunbar harbour and castle ruins

Site information
- Type: Castle of enceinte
- Open to the public: No
- Condition: Ruined

Location
- Location within East Lothian
- Coordinates: 56.0056°N 2.5176°W
- Grid reference: grid reference NT67827930

Site history
- Built: first stone castle c.1070
- Built by: Gospatric, Earl of Northumbria
- In use: Until 1567

Dunbar Castle was one of the strongest fortresses in Scotland, situated in a prominent position overlooking the harbour of the town of Dunbar, in East Lothian. Several fortifications were built successively on the site, near the English-Scottish border. The last was slighted in 1567; it is a ruin today.

== Structure ==
The body of buildings measured in excess of 165 feet (50 m) from east to west, and in some places up to 210 feet (64 m) from north to south. The South Battery, which Grose supposes to have been the citadel or keep, is situated on a detached perpendicular rock, only accessible on one side, 72 feet (22 m) high, and is connected to the main part of the castle by a passage of masonry measuring 69 feet (21 m). The interior of the citadel measures 54 by 60 feet (16 m × 18 m) within the walls. Its shape is octagonal. Five of the gun-ports remain, which are called the 'arrow-holes'. They measure 4 feet (1.2 m) at the mouth and only 16 inches (41 cm) at the other end. The buildings are arched and extend 8 feet (2.4 m) from the outer walls, and look into an open court, whence they derive their light.

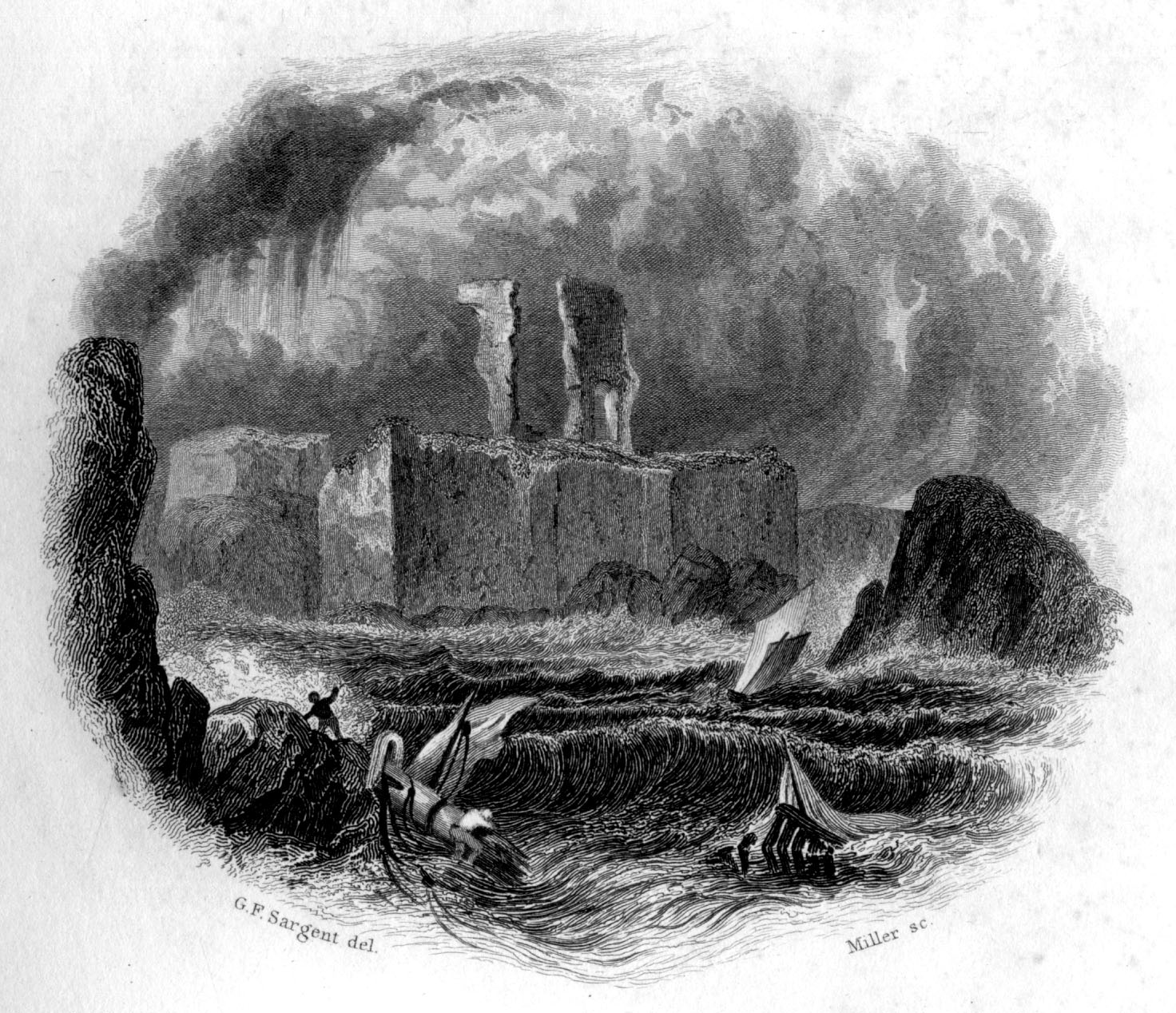
19th-century engraving of the castle

About the middle of the fortress, part of a wall remains, through which there is a gateway, surmounted with armorial bearings. This gate seems to have led to the principal apartments. In the centre, are the arms of George, 10th Earl of Dunbar, who succeeded his uncle in 1369, and who besides the earldom of Dunbar and March, inherited the Lordship of Annandale and the Isle of Man from his heroic aunt, Black Agnes of Dunbar. They must have been placed there after his succession, as he was the first who assumed those sculptured Arms: viz, a large triangular shield, and thereon a lion rampant, within a bordure charged with eight roses. The shield is adorned with a helmet, carrying a crest: a horse's head bridled. On the right are the Arms of the Bruces, and on the left those of the Isle of Man.

The castle towers had communication with the sea, and dip low in many places. North-east from the front of the castle is a large natural cavern, chiefly of black stone, which looks like the mouth of the Acheron – a place that leads to melancholy streams. This spot is supposed to have formed part of the dungeon where prisoners were confined, such as Gavin Douglas, Bishop of Dunkeld, who was a prisoner here in 1515. There is, however, also a dark postern which gives access to a rocky inlet from the sea, and it seems probable that it was through this that Sir Alexander Ramsay and his followers entered with a supply of provisions to the besieged in 1338.

It was long said the castle was invulnerable, possibly because of the many sieges it sustained. The castle was built with a red stone similar to that found in the quarries near Garvald. Large masses of walls, which have fallen beneath the weight of time, appear to be vitrified or run together. In the north-west part of the ruins is an apartment about 12 feet (3.7 m) square, and nearly inaccessible, which tradition states was the apartment of Mary, Queen of Scots.

== History ==
=== Early history ===
The Votadini or Gododdin are thought to have been the first to defend this site, as its original Brythonic name, dyn barr, means 'the fort of the point'. By the 7th century AD, Dunbar Castle was a central defensive position of the Kings of Bernicia, an Anglian kingdom that took over from the British kingdom of Bryneich.

=== Northumbria ===
During the Early Middle Ages, Dunbar Castle was held by an Ealdorman owing homage either to the kings at Bamburgh Castle, or latterly to the kings of York. In 678 Saint Wilfrid was imprisoned at Dunbar, following his expulsion from his see of York by Ecgfrith of Northumbria.

Later, Dunbar is said to have been burnt by Kenneth MacAlpin, King of the Scots. Certainly he is on record as in possession of the castle.

=== Kingdom of the Scots ===
In the 10th and early 11th centuries, the Norsemen made increasing inroads into Scotland, and in 1005 a record exists of a Patrick de Dunbar, under Malcolm II, engaged against the Norse invaders in the north at Murthlake, a town of Marr where he was slain alongside Kenneth, Thane of the Isles, and Grim, Thane of Strathearn.

The first stone castle is thought to have been built by Gospatric, Earl of Northumbria, after his exile from England, following the Harrowing of the North, by William the Conqueror after Gospatric took refuge at the court of Malcolm III of Scotland. Gospatric was a powerful landowner in both kingdoms and could summon many men, which encouraged Malcolm to give him more lands in East Lothian, the Merse and Lauderdale, as recompense for those lost further south and in return for loyalty, as was usual under the feudal system. Sir Walter Scott argued that Cospatric or Gospatrick was a contraction of Comes Patricius. In any case, King Malcolm III is recorded as bestowing the manor of Dunbar &c., on "the expatriated Earl of Northumberland".

In June 1338, Sir Alexander Ramsay of Dalhousie relieved Dunbar Castle and assisted the Countess of Dunbar ("Black Agnes of Dunbar"). Together they successfully defended the castle against the siege by William Montagu, 1st Earl of Salisbury of England.

=== James IV ===
The castle remained the stronghold of the Earls of Dunbar until the forfeiture of George, Earl of March, in 1457, when the castle was dismantled to prevent its occupation by the English. It was restored by James IV later in the century. Andrew Wood of Largo was the keeper. In April 1497 timber was bought for the "Hannis tower" and the master mason Walter Merlioun was completing the gatehouse or "fore work". Nails were bought for the "yetts" of the gatehouse, a wooden portcullis and a metal grille or yett made by Thomas Barker. John the Quarrier excavated a new well.

James IV visited in April 1497 and gave the masons drinksilver reward payments in May. On 20 August 1497, James IV met Sir William Tyler, the governor of Berwick, at Dunbar to discuss a truce.

Building lime was brought from Cousland, and received at Dunbar by Thomas Foret. The hinges or "crukis" for the iron yett were made in the forge at Edinburgh Castle. A carpenter, Patrick Falconer, measured the roof or ceiling of the king's chamber at Edinburgh Castle to make a similar roof at Dunbar. In August 1497 two Dunbar carpenters, William Young and Thomas Makachane, started to roof the Hannis tower. In September it was finished by Andrew the "Sclater". Slates and rafters were brought to Dunbar in Will Merrymowth's boat. In 1501 new iron window grills or yetts were provided.

Andrew Forman, Bishop of Moray, was made keeper of Dunbar Castle in September 1503. Ferquhard Mackintosh, an heir to the Lordship of the Isles, was held prisoner in the castle for over ten years.

=== James Stewart, Duke of Albany ===
The castle came under the control of the Duke of Albany during the minority of James V. The garrison of 100 French soldiers was paid by Francis I of France, who sent their wages to the quartermaster Maurice de Nogent. During this period the artillery bulwark to the west was built. It may have been designed by Antoine d'Arces, Sieur de la Bastie who was placed in charge of the castle in December 1514. An English soldier, the Baron Dacre, visited and was impressed by the new "bulwerk". Albany organised further repairs and amendments in June 1527.

An Italian drawing for a fortification of this period by Antonio da Sangallo the Younger, marked as an opinion for "il Duca D'Albania," has been associated with Dunbar, but may depict another project. An article by the historian Bryony Coombs further explores the activities of the Duke of Albany and his architectural and artistic connections that informed the design of the blockhouse and situates the building in a European context, and highlights the resemblance of the drawing to the Fort de Salses as built for Ferdinand II of Aragon.

=== James V ===
James V came to the castle frequently in the summer of 1537 after the death of his first wife, Madeleine of Valois, and oversaw the arrangement of his artillery. A Scottish courtier James Atkinhead was installed as captain. In 1540, Aitkenhead's garrison included a number of foreign artillery and handgun experts, including Master Wolf, Morso or Marco of Armorica who was the armourer, Peter Cumbo, Tibo Rukour, John Rubino, and Peter Schoffett. The King's armourer, William Smeberd, refurbished weapons at Dunbar in August 1541 including halberds and "Jedburgh staves". Patrick Wemyss of Pittencrieff was captain of the castle in 1542 and spent £100 Scots on repairs.

=== Anglo-Scottish Wars of 1540s ===
Dunbar Castle was involved in the war with England known as the "Rough Wooing". In July 1545 the Earl of Angus mentioned that Edinburgh Castle had been re-fortified, "but as for Dunbar he heard of nothing done to it". French money amounting to £1,370 in 1546 was sent to fund repairs to the castle in 1546. In August 1547 the cannon called "Thrawynmouth" was shipped from Dunbar for use at the siege of St Andrews Castle. Repair works were carried out by Robert Hamilton of Briggis.

The town of Dunbar was burnt by the William Grey, 13th Baron Grey de Wilton in June 1548. A French soldier, Monsieur La Chapelle was made keeper of the castle on 18 June 1548 and William Hamilton of Humby was captain. Further re-fortifications in 1548 were directed by Piero Strozzi and Migliorino Ubaldini. English observers reported over 500 workmen would be employed on the castle in August 1548, Regent Arran ordered a mason John Arthur to come from Haddington to work on the castle.

The English soldier Thomas Holcroft described the activities of Peter Landstedt, a lieutenant of the German mercenary Courtpennick (Konrad Pennick), on 24 September 1549. Despite cannon fire from the castle, Landstedt got a foothold in a house in Dunbar, and used the furniture to start fires in the town. Landstedt planned to make an entrenchment in front of the castle to place his guns, and he thought the walls of the castle near the town were "very old and low," and now "revised with earth and mounds", these old walls being stone on the natural rock. He thought the old high walls of the inner court could be broken by bombardment to destroy the "first walls" of the castle. These plans were not realised. Regent Arran gave a tip to "devisaris and draweris of the fort", setting out a new fortification in December 1550. The French soldier and writer, Jean de Beaugué, described the castle and its proximity to key sites in the war:

The castle is a very handsome and strong place built on a lofty rock on the edge of the sea, very difficult of approach, and on which so much art has been displayed, that few places are to be found anywhere at the present time, which are by nature more commodious, less exposed to battery, and all other methods of storming, than this castle, which besides, is sufficiently near Lauder, Dunglass, Haddington, Eyemouth, Fast Castle, and the sea road of North Berwick and the Bass.

=== Reformation crisis ===
During her Regency, Mary of Guise employed an Italian military engineer called Lorenzo Pomarelli. She paid James Acheson for works at Dunbar in August 1554. The French ambassador in London, Antoine de Noailles advised her to strengthen and repair her fortresses including Dunbar. Mary of Guise came to Dunbar Castle in June 1559 in fear of the Protestant Lords of the Congregation who occupied Edinburgh. Guise sent money to French captain of Dunbar, Corbeyran de Sarlabous, for two weeks' wages for workmen in April 1560. In May, an Italian engineer was working on further improvements for the French garrison.

These works were inspected by Robert Hamilton in Briggs, keeper of Linlithgow Palace and Master of the Royal Artillery, and Robert Montgomery in July 1560, after the death of Mary of Guise, on behalf of the Lords of the Congregation who reported that the Castle was "more ample by the double than it was of before" and capable of holding 500 more soldiers. The new work was immediately demolished as a provision of the Treaty of Edinburgh. Local landowners, including the Prioress of North Berwick and the Prioress of Haddington, were tasked with the demolition of sections of a "rampire", a rampart with its ditch and counter scarp, and a great platform for artillery. 100 English workmen called "pioneers" were sent to the castle in August.

The French captain, Corbeyran de Sarlabous, remained in charge of the castle and refurbished a cavern which was within the area scheduled for demolition. The rebel Lord Sempill found a refuge in the castle in August 1560. The Castle remained garrisoned by 60 French troops under the command of Sarlabous until September 1561.

=== Mary, Queen of Scots ===
Mary, Queen of Scots made Robert Anstruther captain of Dunbar in July 1561. He took charge of the cannons and ammunition according to an inventory made by Robert Hamilton of Briggs. Soon after her return to Scotland in August 1561, she appointed her half-brother Lord John keeper of the castle, and visited the castle in September. In November 1561 John Chisholm, comptroller clerk of the royal artillery provided six culverins. The master of work William MacDowall and David Rowan, an expert gunner from Edinburgh castle surveyed the fort. Mary stayed at Dunbar with Lord John on 30 December 1562. Chisholm shipped cannon and gun carriages from Dunbar north to Aberdeen and back in October 1562 during operations against the Earl of Huntly.

Mary appointed Simon Preston of Craigmillar captain of Dunbar. She visited in February 1564 and came to stay at the castle for a week in November 1564. On 24 August 1565, during the rebellion against Mary, Queen of Scots called the Chaseabout Raid, Mary ordered repairs to the gun emplacements and artillery, hand tools that might be needed to re-build the ramparts during a siege, and provisions according to Preston's recommendations. The castle gunners James Hector and Harry Balfour disputed their seniority in November 1565. Mary wrote to England about the succession from Dunbar on 18 November 1566. On 24 April 1567, Mary was brought to the castle by the Earl of Bothwell, and then came to Dunbar before confronting her enemies at the battle of Carberry Hill on 15 June 1567.

There was a siege in September 1567 to eject Bothwell's supporters and the captain, Patrick Whitelaw or Quhytelaugh. The bakers and butchers of Haddington were summoned to supply the camp, and brewers were ordered to bring ale. John Chisholm brought guns from Edinburgh Castle. William Kirkcaldy of Grange was made keeper of the castle on 1 October.

== Slighting and demolition ==
Dunbar Castle was finally slighted by order of the Parliament of Scotland in December 1567. Dunbar and the fortress on Inchkeith were to be "cast down utterly to the ground and destroyed in such a way that no foundation thereof be the occasion to build thereupon in time coming." The Historie of King James the Sext notes the order to demolish the "king's hous of strenthe." William Drury reported that Regent Moray was prevented from finishing the demolition in January 1568, as the master carpenter (probably Andrew Mansioun) estimated the work would cost £2000 Scots. It was said that the same sum spent on rebuilding would make it "one of the strongest places in Scotland". In September 1568, some of the stone was selected for reuse at the quayside of the Shore of Leith.

== See also ==
- List of places in East Lothian
