= John II of Namur =

John II, Marquis of Namur
- Born: 1311
- Died: 2 April 1335
- Noble family: House of Dampierre
- Father: John I, Marquis of Namur
- Mother: Marie of Artois

John II (1311 – 2 April 1335) was Marquis of Namur from 1331 to 1335.

He was the eldest son of John I, Marquis of Namur, and Marie of Artois.

== Reign ==
He succeeded his father on 26 January 1330. He joined an alliance against John III, Duke of Brabant, but by the intervention of King Philip VI of France, a conflict was averted.

He died unmarried, but had an illegitimate son Philip, who was killed in 1380, while defending Dendermonde.

He was succeeded by his brother Guy.

John II of Namur House of Dampierre Born: 1311 Died: 2 April 1335
Preceded by John I	Marquis of Namur; 1330–1335	Succeeded by Guy II
