= Gaston II of Foix =

Count of Foix

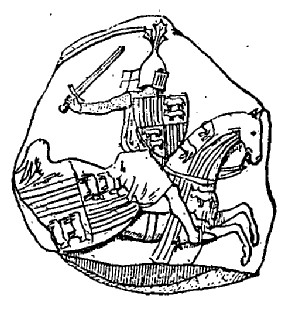

Gaston II of Foix-Béarn (1308 – September 1343), son of Gaston I of Foix-Béarn and Joan of Artois, was the count of Foix.

In 1315, after the death of his father Gaston I, he became count of Foix, and viscount of Béarn, Marsan, Gabardan, Nébouzan and Lautrec under the regency of his mother, Joan of Artois. Count Gaston II imprisoned his mother in 1331 at the Château of Foix, being later moved in turn to Orthez, Lourdes and Carbonne.

Gaston II married his cousin Eleanor of Comminges, daughter of Bernard VII of Comminges and Laura of Montfort. Eleanor brought, as a dowry, her rights to the County of Bigorre.

They had one son: Gaston III Febus, who succeeded his father as count of Foix.

Gaston II had several illegitimate children:

- Pedro de Bearn, married Florensa de Aragón, Lady of Biscay.
- Bearnesa, wife of Arnaldo Ramon de Castellnou, viscount of Orthez.
- Margarita, wife of Juan de Castellverdu, seigneur of Caumont
- Arnaldo Guillermo de Bearn (died 1391), married to Juana, Lady of Morlaàs.

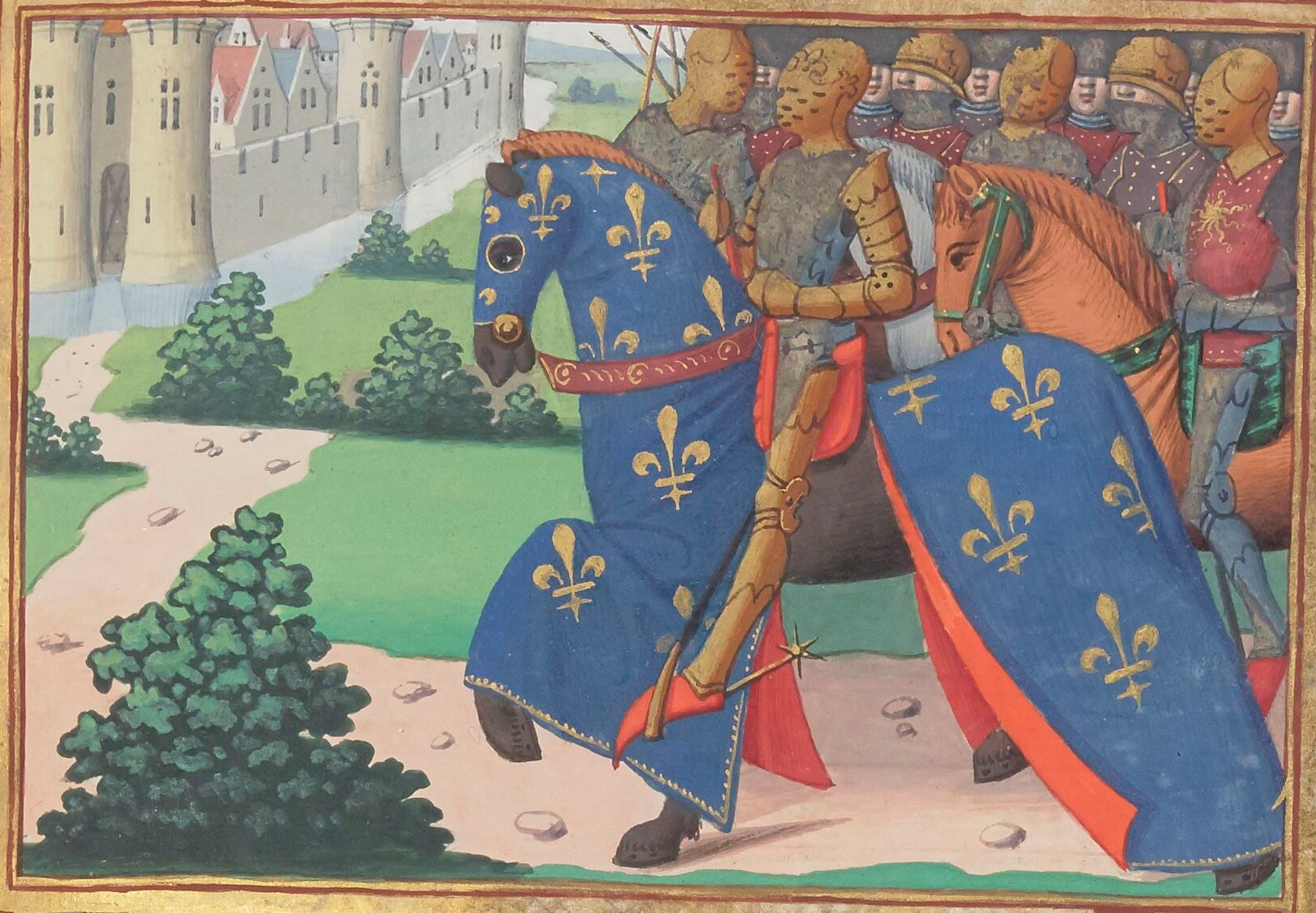
Siege of Tartas from the Vigiles du Roy Charles VII of France

He was at the Siege of Algeciras (1342–1344) in southern Spain, which was led by King Alfonso XI of Castile. He died at Seville in 1343.
