= Gaston I of Foix =

Co-prince of Andorra

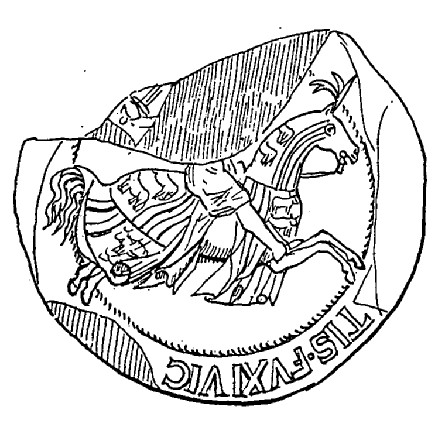
Equestrian seal of Gaston I, Count of Foix

Gaston I of Foix or Gaston VIII of Foix-Béarn (1287 – 13 December 1315 in Maubuisson) was the 9th Count of Foix, the 22nd Viscount of Béarn and Co-Prince of Andorra.

== Biography ==
He was a son of Roger-Bernard III, Count of Foix and Margaret of Béarn, the eldest daughter and heiress of Gaston VII of Béarn. He succeeded his father in 1302 as Count Gaston I of Foix and Viscount Gaston VIII of Béarn, first under the regency of his mother.

He was probably present at the Battle of the Golden Spurs in 1302, and fought again for the King of France against the Flemish at the Battle of Mons-en-Pévèle in 1304. When the cities of his County of Foix rebelled against the Royal tax collectors, because they raised the taxes to finance the expensive war against Flanders, Gaston supported his cities. For this, the County was confiscated for a while by the Senechal of Carcassonne.

In 1308, he started a war against the Count of Armagnac, against the orders of the King, who had forbidden intra-French warfare. Gaston was taken prisoner and locked up in the Châtelet. He was only released after paying a ransom of 36,000 livres. He also had armed conflicts with his uncle James II of Majorca and even with his own mother, who firmly ruled Foix during his many absences.

In 1310, he inherited the Viscounty of Marsan from his aunt Constance of Moncada. When another uncle, Ermengol X, Count of Urgell, died without a male heir, Gaston claimed the County of Urgell, but was no match against King Alfonso IV of Aragon, who incorporated Urgell into the Crown of Aragon.

On his return from yet another war against Flanders, Gaston fell ill and died in the Maubuisson Abbey, near Pontoise. His body was transferred to the Boulbonne Abbey, where it was buried alongside his ancestors. Some records state he was buried in the now-demolished church of the Couvent des Jacobins in Paris.

== Marriage and children ==
Gaston married in 1301 Joan of Artois (1289-1350), daughter of Philip of Artois and Blanche of Brittany. They had:

- Gaston II de Foix, Count of Foix, Viscount of Béarn (1308 – 26 September 1343).
- Roger Bernard IV de Foix (1310 – after 24 March 1350), married Constanza de Luna (1310 – January 1353), daughter of Artal de Luna, by whom he had three children.
- Robert de Foix, Bishop of Lavaur
- Margaret of Foix
- Blanche de Foix, married in 1328 Jean de Grailly, Viscount of Castillon, Captal de Buch, by whom she had two children, including Jean III de Grailly, Captal de Buch.
- Joan of Foix (died 1358), married Infante Peter of Aragon, Count of Ribagorza y Ampurias, by whom she had three children, including Eleanor of Aragon, Queen of Cyprus.

== Sources ==
- Lodge, Eleanor C. (1926). Gascony under English Rule. Methuen & Co. Ltd.
- Viader, Roland (2003). L'Andorre du IXe au XIVe siècle: montagne, féodalité et communautés. Presses Universitaire du Mirail.
