= Agnes Dunbar (mistress) =

Mistress to the King of Scotland

Agnes Dunbar (fl. late 14th century) was a Scottish noblewoman, a mistress and intended-wife of King David II of Scotland, son of Robert the Bruce.

She was the niece (and possibly fosterling) of the famous heroine 'Black Agnes' Agnes Randolph, Countess of Dunbar and March. Her mother was Isabella Randolph, sister of Countess Agnes and daughter of Thomas Randolph, first Earl of Moray. Her father, Sir Patrick Dunbar, was the son of Sir Alexander Dunbar and grandson of Patrick, seventh Earl of Dunbar, and his wife, Cecilia. She was also the "very dear sister" of George Dunbar, 10th Earl of March who granted to her the lands of Mordington and Whittinghame, on her marriage with Sir James Douglas of Dalkeith.

She was first married to a man called Robert, and they had children.

She become a mistress of King David II of Scotland around 1369. This is supported by the fact that he made support payments to her beginning in 1369. It was King David's desire to marry Agnes; however, he was still married to his second wife Margaret Drummond. King David attempted to divorce Margaret on the grounds of infertility, but this was refused by Pope Urban V. He was still planning to marry Agnes when in February 1371 he suddenly died. A payment of 1000 merks, a very large sum at that time, was arranged for her a month before the king's death.

On 21 November 1372 she married Sir James Douglas of Dalkeith. Their son was James Douglas, 1st Lord Dalkeith. They also had a daughter, Jacoba Douglas who married John Hamilton, 4th Laird of Cadzow (born before 1370 – died c. 1402). Their great-grandson was James Douglas, 1st Earl of Morton.

== Sources ==
- S. Boardman, The Early Stewart Kings of Scotland
