= Alexander Ramsay of Dalhousie =

Scottish nobleman and knight

Sir Alexander Ramsay of Dalhousie (c. 1290–1342) (sometimes spelt: Dalwolsey) was a Scottish nobleman and knight who fought for David II, King of Scots in the south of Scotland in the Second War of Scottish Independence. He is remembered especially for his actions during the siege of Roxburgh Castle.

== Life ==
Alexander was the eldest of two sons born to Sir William Ramsay of Dalhousie (c. 1235–1320). Alexander's sibling was Sir William Ramsay of Inverleith.

=== Military career ===
Alexander fought with Sir Andrew Murray, Guardian of the Realm, at the Battle of Culblean in the Scottish victory over the English force on 30 November 1335 and later at Boroughmuir, where Guy de Namur, a Flemish ally of England, was defeated and captured. He was present at the capture of Leuchars Castle, at St Andrews in 1335. In June 1338 he smuggled supplies to Agnes Randolph, Countess of Dunbar allowing her to defend the castle against the siege by William Montagu, 1st Earl of Salisbury of England.

During a brief truce that same year, he took part in a tournament against English knights at Berwick.

Ramsay and his men recaptured Roxburgh Castle from the English at around dawn on 30 March 1342 by means of a night escalade. The titular constable of the Castle, Sir William Douglas, had several times tried unsuccessfully to retake it. In reward, King David II appointed Sir Alexander constable of Roxburgh and Sheriff of Teviotdale, which outraged Douglas.

On 20 June 1342, Ramsay held court at Hawick, in accordance with his duty as sheriff. Douglas came with an armed retinue and entered the church where Ramsay was holding court. Douglas and his men attacked Ramsay, dragging him bleeding and in chains to Hermitage Castle. Ramsay was imprisoned in a dungeon at Hermitage Castle, where he died. Legend has it that he survived for seventeen days by eating small quantities of grain that fell through the cracks in the floor of the castle granary above the dungeon.

His brother, Sir William Ramsay of Inverleith, succeeded Sir Alexander at Dalhousie in 1342 and was well-known for his raid around Norham Castle, as well as the ensuing Battle of Nisbet Muir in 1355.

== See also ==
- Clan Ramsay
