= Thomas Randolph, 2nd Earl of Moray =

Scottish military commander (died 1332)

The Right Honourable Thomas Randolph
- Earl of Moray
- Coat of arms
- Tenure: 20 July 1332 – 11 August 1332
- Predecessor: Thomas Randolph, 1st Earl of Moray
- Successor: John Randolph, 3rd Earl of Moray
- Died: 11 August 1332
- Father: Thomas Randolph, 1st Earl of Moray
- Mother: Isabella Stewart

Thomas Randolph, 2nd Earl of Moray (died 11 August 1332), a Scottish military commander, held his title for just 23 days.

The son of Thomas Randolph, 1st Earl of Moray, a companion-in-arms of King Robert the Bruce, he succeeded his father on 20 July 1332.

Thomas, 2nd Earl of Moray had a chief command under the Earl of Mar ranged against the army of Edward Balliol at the Battle of Dupplin Moor, where he was killed. He died childless.

Peerage of Scotland
Preceded by Thomas Randolph	Earl of Moray; 1332	Succeeded by John Randolph
