= Marie de Namur =

- Born: c. 1322
- Died: c. 1353/57
- Noble family: House of Dampierre
- Spouses: Henry II, Graf of Vianden; Theobald of Bar, Seigneur de Pierrepont
- Issue: With Henry; Maria of Vianden; With Theobald; Yolande of Bar; Elisabeth de Bar
- Father: John I of Namur
- Mother: Marie of Artois

Marie of Namur, also known as Marie de Namur or Maria van Dampierre. Her titles were Gräfin von Vianden, from her first marriage and Dame de Pierrepont, from her second marriage to, Theobald of Bar.

Born in 1322 to John I of Namur and his wife Marie of Artois. She had three sisters, including Blanche of Namur, Queen consort of Sweden and Norway, and seven brothers.

In 1335/36, she married her first husband, Henry II, Graf of Vianden, son of Philip II, Graf of Vianden and his first wife Lucia von der Neuerburg. Henry was murdered at Famagusta in September 1337. In c. 1337, she gave birth to Maria of Vianden her first daughter from her marriage to Henry II, Graf of Vianden. Her second marriage in 1340 (dispensation 9 September 1342) was to her father's second cousin, Theobald of Bar, Seigneur de Pierrepont, son of Erard of Bar, Seigneur de Pierrepont et d'Ancerville (himself son of Theobald II of Bar), and his wife Isabelle of Lorraine (daughter of Theobald II, Duke of Lorraine). This marriage produced two daughters, Yolande de Bar (b. c 1343 – d. c 1410) and Elisabeth de Bar (b. c 1345 – d. before 11 May 1411).

Marie died somewhere before 29 October 1353/57.

== Marriages and issue ==
Married Henry II, Graf of Vianden, they had:

- Maria of Vianden (b. c 1337 – d. 21 Oct 1400) married in 1348 with Simon III von Spanheim.

Married Theobald of Bar in 1340, they had:

- Yolande de Bar (b. c 1343 – d. c 1410) married before 1360 with Eudes VII, Sire de Grancey, Louvois, Pierrepont.
- Elisabeth (Isabel) de Bar (b. c 1345 – d. before 11 May 1411) married before 18 Oct 1360 with Otto, Lord of Arkel.
