= Battle of Boroughmuir =

1335 battle in Edinburgh, Scotland

Coordinates: 55°56′N 3°11′W

- Part of the Second War of Scottish Independence
Date	30 July 1335
Location	Edinburgh, Scotland
Result	Scottish victory

Belligerents
Kingdom of Scotland	Kingdom of England

Commanders and leaders
Earl of Moray; Earl of March; Sir Alexander Ramsay	Count of Namur (surrendered)

Strength
300 knights, men-at-arms and archers	Unknown

Casualties and losses
Unknown	Unknown

The Battle of Boroughmuir was fought on 30 July 1335 between Guy, Count of Namur, a cousin of Queen Philippa of England, and John Randolph, 3rd Earl of Moray and Guardian of Scotland. Namur was on his way to join Edward III on his invasion of Scotland, when he was intercepted on the common grazing ground to the south of Edinburgh – the Borough Muir. The fighting continued into the city itself, and concluded in a desperate struggle in the ruins of the old castle. Randolph was victorious in a fight which forms a small part of the Second War of Scottish Independence.

== The Great Invasion ==
Ever since 1332 a part of Anglo-Scots nobles, known collectively as the 'disinherited', had been trying to establish Edward Balliol, son and heir of John Balliol, on the throne of Scotland in place of David II. These men, who had fought against Robert Bruce during the First war of Independence, were given the active support of the English. Yet despite two remarkable victories at the Battle of Dupplin Moor and the Battle of Halidon Hill, which came close to exterminating the governing class of Scotland, the Balliol party was not strong-or popular-enough to establish itself by its own means. Twice Edward Balliol had been seated on the Scottish throne, and twice had he been toppled off. In 1335 King Edward decided to make one great effort on behalf of his hapless and unlucky protégé, coming to Scotland himself at the head of an army, the largest to enter the country since his father came to Edinburgh in 1322.

By the second week of July the king had over 13000 men in arms at Newcastle. He was joined there by Edward Balliol, coming from Carlisle. A council of war was held and it was decided that Scotland would be enveloped in a vast pincer movement by land and sea. The army was divided in two: Edward was to command the invasion of Scotland from Carlisle, while Balliol moved northwards from Berwick. His progress would be supported by a strong naval force moving up the east coast towards the Firth of Tay, while Edward would have similar support from a force sailing from Ireland into the Firth of Clyde.

The purpose of the invasion was to find and destroy the Scottish army in the field, rather than take castles. Edward marched through Nithsdale, bypassing Loch Doon castle, still held for King David, and overran Carrick, Cunninghame and Kyle. In the meantime, Balliol moved quickly up the east coast into Lothian. Like a plague of biblical locusts his army consumed everything in its path. Letters of protection issued by Edward himself did nothing to protect Newbattle Abbey or Manuel Nunnery from destruction. In the Firth of Forth the abbey on the island of Inchcolm was destroyed by the English navy, which then proceeded north into the Tay, landing at Dundee, setting the town and its Franciscan friary alight. The looting and destruction of the friary caused the English author of the Lanercost Chronicle to drop his usual patriotic cloak and express his disapproval in a brief flourish of Christian solidarity. Towards the end of July the land arms of the pincer joined at Glasgow, having caught nothing of substance in their embrace and from there marched on to Perth.

The driving force behind the Scottish resistance was the Earl of Moray. Not strong enough to face the enemy in direct attack; he limited his actions to small-scale operations in the rear of the main English army, attacking supply columns and the like. The opportunity for more decisive action came about the time Edward and Balliol were meeting up at Glasgow.

== Will You Go to Boroughmuir? ==
Guy of Namur had arrived with his retinue at Berwick, too late to join the king in his invasion. Namur's motives were firmly in the tradition of chivalry; to take part in a military adventure and to thereby enhance the chivalric reputation of himself and of the company of 100 or so men-at-arms who accompanied him. He was a Fleming, and beyond his kinship to Queen Philippa, should have had little interest in Edward's Scottish war. It is reasonably safe to assume that he was simply looking for adventure; for his desire for action led him to take a step that more prudent council should have advised against. With a small force of some 300 knights, men-at-arms and archers he entered Scotland, hoping to meet up with the king in the centre of the country. His movements are likely to have been observed virtually from the outset; for he was ambushed as he approached Edinburgh by the earl of Moray. Namur managed to fight his way through to the Borough Muir, where on 30 July he found himself in the midst of a full-scale battle. His men gave a good account of themselves; but when Sir William Douglas arrived from the nearby Pentland Hills to reinforce Moray, they were in immediate danger of being overwhelmed.

== A Wall of Horse Flesh ==
With no other option Namur and his men made for Edinburgh, a little to the north of their present position. Closely pursued by the enemy they entered the city by way of the Friars' Wynd, and the fighting continued through the St. Mary Wynd all the way up to the castle, which had lain in ruins since 1314. The gaps in the defenses were filled in the only way possible; the horses were killed to provide a barricade of flesh. Moray and his men were held for the time being, but the position was hopeless. Walter Bower, the chronicler, describes their predicament and the outcome;

The men of Namur therefore, as they fled and fought bravely, kept together until they climbed the lamentable hill where there used to be the Maidens' castle of Edinburgh, which had been demolished earlier for fear of the English. These rocks they defended courageously, and killing their exhausted and injured horses besides, they made a defensive wall with their bodies. And thus, surrounded and besieged by the Scots throughout the whole of that night, they passed it continuously without sleep, hungry, cold, thirsty and weary. Tired out and distressed in this way, and with no hope of any help, they in the morning of the next day surrendered themselves to the Scots in capitulation, after an agreement had been reached about the ransom to be paid, provided that they could depart to their home country.

== Defeat in Victory ==
Moray behaved with generosity, allowing them to depart on swearing never again to take arms against the supporters of King David. There was, besides any chivalric considerations, a political dimension to his actions. Namur was the subject of Philip VI, king of France, and the Guardian had no wish to upset Scotland's most vital ally. He even decided to escort Namur in person back towards the border. It cost him dearly. On his way back he was ambushed by an English force from Jedburgh under William Pressen. Sir William Douglas managed to escape, but his brother, James, was killed. Moray himself was taken prisoner, destined to spend the next five years in English jails. Namur returned to Berwick and sailed with Queen Philippa to join Edward at Perth. He was well received by the king, although his recent discomfiture must have been the occasion for some political embarrassment. Because of his pact with Moray the count was of no military value to Edward, and he soon left Scotland, never to return. With his reputation compromised the unfortunate Namur was severely censured by the English chroniclers for daring to enter enemy territory with so modest a following.
