= Thomas Randolph, 1st Earl of Moray =

Scottish soldier and nobleman

Thomas Randolph
- Earl of Moray
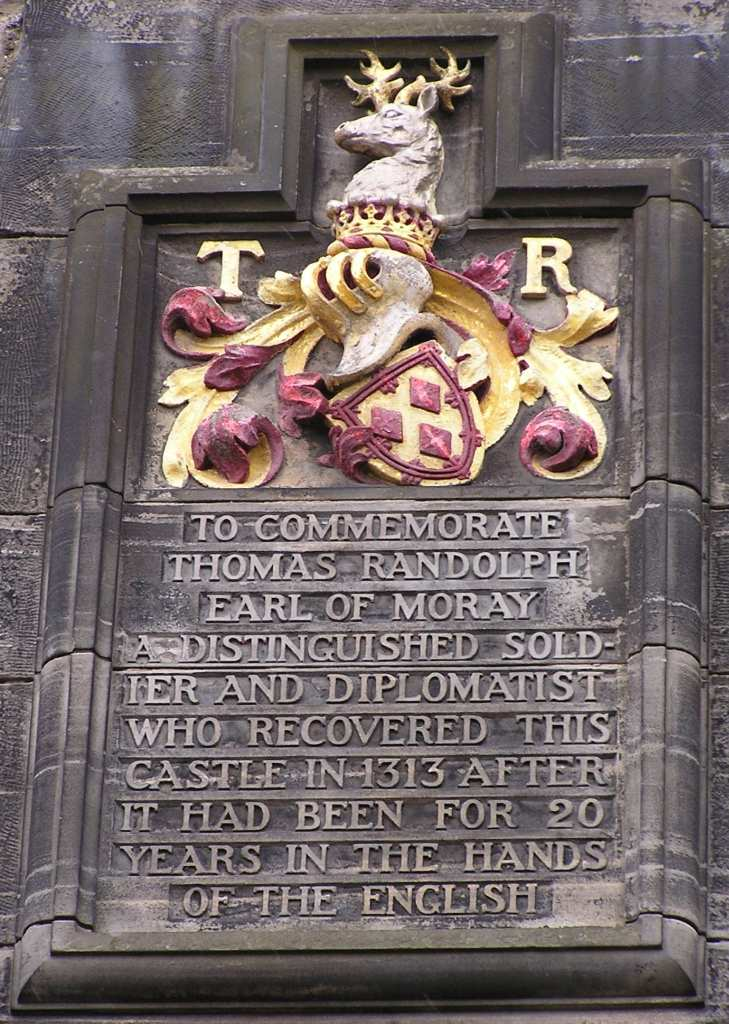
- Inscription on Edinburgh Castle
- Born: c. 1285
- Died: 20 July 1332; Musselburgh, East Lothian, Scotland
- Spouse: Isabel Stewart of Bonkyll
- Issue: Thomas, 2nd Earl of Moray; John, 3rd Earl of Moray; Agnes Randolph; Isobel Randolph
- Father: Sir Thomas Randolph
- Mother: Martha of Kilconquhar

Thomas Randolph, Earl of Moray (c. 1285 – 20 July 1332) was a soldier and diplomat in the Wars of Scottish Independence, who later served as regent of Scotland. He was a nephew of Robert the Bruce, who created him as the first Earl of Moray. He was known for successfully capturing Edinburgh Castle from the English, and he was one of the signatories of the Declaration of Arbroath.

== Early life ==
Thomas was the son of another Thomas, who was Chamberlain of Scotland and Sheriff of Roxburgh, and the grandson of the Randulf or Ranulf who gave the family their surname. It is known that the younger Thomas was the nephew of King Robert the Bruce; his mother was Martha of Kilconquhar, Robert's older half-sister. The traditional view is that she was of the first marriage of Marjorie of Carrick, who was the mother of Robert the Bruce by her second marriage. There has been conjecture that the King's father Robert married again after Marjorie's death and had with his second wife a daughter, Isabel, who married the elder Thomas; however, because Marjorie of Carrick did not die until 1292 and Thomas the younger was at the coronation of John Balliol in 1292, this is impossible. There is no record of Randolph's date of birth. Although the author of Scots Peerage speculated that Randolph's date of birth was 1278, his grandmother was born in 1253 or 1256, and it is unlikely that he was born when his grandmother was in her early twenties. Therefore, that date has to be called into question. Thomas' mother, Martha of Kilconquhar, was born in 1270 before the Countess of Carrick married Robert de Brus, therefore, it is more likely that Thomas was born about 1285.

== War of Independence ==
Earl Thomas's coat of arms consisted of three cushions within a double tressure. The symbolism of the cushions is not known, but they may have represented wealth and luxury. The tressure was added by Thomas to show his royal connection: the same symbol appeared on King Robert's arms

Thomas supported Robert in his attempt to take the throne and was present at his uncle's coronation in 1306. He was probably knighted by the king then or shortly after. Following the Scottish defeat at the Battle of Methven, he was taken prisoner by the English, coming under the custody first of Sir Adam Gordon and then of the Earl of Lincoln. During his confinement, he joined the English cause, and remained attached to them until he was captured by Sir James Douglas in 1307, and persuaded to rejoin the Scottish side. His defection came to the attention of Edward II of England, who forfeited all his lands, bestowing them on his favourite Hugh le Despencer.

In 1312 King Robert I created him Earl of Moray, and he became ruler of a large swathe of land in the north of Scotland, far exceeding his southern possessions. He was also made lord of the Isle of Man; according to the reddendo or charter this was in exchange for six ships of 26 oars and money to the value of 100 merks to be paid at Inverness. Around this time he became one of Robert's most trusted lieutenants, and he seems to have accompanied him on most of his campaigns. His most famous achievement was on 14 March 1314 when he carried out a daring attack on Edinburgh Castle. This was one of a handful of castles in Scotland still in English hands, and stood on top of an apparently unscalable rock. Amongst Moray's men was William Francis, the son of a former governor of the castle, who knew of a secret path up the rock. Moray used this path to reach the castle, and successfully retook it for the Scots.

Moray played an important role in the Scottish victory at the Battle of Bannockburn, where he commanded one of the three divisions (schiltrons) of the infantry, the others being commanded by King Robert and Edward Bruce, the king's brother. Many historians, however, citing John Barbour's work, contend that there were four schiltrons, one commanded by James Douglas and Walter Stewart. On the first day of the two-day battle, a body of three hundred English cavalry under Sir Robert Clifford, Sir Henry de Beaumont and Sir Thomas Gray attempted to bypass the Scots army and in order to relieve Stirling Castle. Seeing this, Randolph led his men to block the road and drew up in a circular schiltron. They were attacked from all sides by the English. Unable to break the hedge of spearmen and taking numerous casualties, the English began to waver. Sir James Douglas was given permission to go to Randolph's aid, but seeing that it was not needed, he took no share in the action, the site of which became known as Randolph's Field. The next day found Randolph in command of the centre of the Scottish battle.

== Ireland ==
In 1315 Moray accompanied Edward Bruce, the king's brother, during his invasion of Ireland. He was one of the principal leaders in the war against the Lordship of Ireland. He returned twice to Scotland during the war to obtain reinforcements and to get Robert's personal presence in Ireland.

== Border incursions ==
Moray and Douglas were closely allied and the two were associated in a series of exploits. In 1318 they seized the town of Berwick by escalade; with help from one of the burgesses, Simon of Spalding, and reinforced by Bruce, they soon became masters of the castle. In the next spring, they made a raid on the northern English counties, laying waste the country as far as York, where they hoped to seize the English queen Isabella. They defeated the militia hastily raised by William de Melton, archbishop of York, in a fight known as the Battle of Myton but also the "Chapter of Myton", because of the number of clerics who fell in the battle. Edward II, who was laying siege to Berwick, sought in vain to intercept them on their return journey. Later in the year the two Scottish nobles again raided England, and at length Edward signed a truce for two years. In 1322, Moray shared in Douglas's exploit in the Battle of Old Byland.

== Diplomatic career ==
Moray's name appears directly after Robert's on the 1320 Declaration of Arbroath, which was sent to Pope John XXII by the nobles of Scotland to persuade him to recognise Scotland as an independent nation. In 1323, along with Bishop William Lamberton he was a principal negotiator in the talks that resulted in a thirteen-year truce between Scotland and England. Later, in 1324, he was sent to meet the Pope in person at his court in Avignon. At this meeting, Randolph successfully persuaded Pope John to recognise Robert as King of Scots, a major diplomatic coup. The next year the Pope wrote to Moray declaring his hope and trust in his efforts to make peace between England and Scotland and gave permission for him to visit the Holy Sepulchre in Jerusalem.

Moray was again sent to France in 1325, this time to persuade King Charles IV to sign the Treaty of Corbeil renewing the Franco-Scottish alliance, which he did successfully.

After his return to Scotland, he had a commanding role in the Scottish victory at the Battle of Stanhope Park over the English. The Scots and English proceeded to sign the Treaty of Edinburgh–Northampton, by which Scotland's independence was finally acknowledged.

== Regent ==
During the King's final years, Moray had been a constant companion and had superintended the household of the young heir to the throne, David. Before his death, Robert decreed that Moray would serve as regent for David, who was only five years old when he succeeded as king. Moray performed this role justly and wisely, but died at Musselburgh three years later on 20 July 1332, while on his way to repel an invasion by Edward Balliol and his supporters. At the time it was said that he had been poisoned by the English, but some modern historians believe that it is more likely that he died from a kidney stone. His successor as regent was Donald, Earl of Mar.

The poet and chronicler John Barbour provides us with a pen portrait of Thomas Randolph, 1st Earl of Moray, among the first of its kind in Scottish history. Unlike his pen portrait of James, Lord of Douglas, he does not say it was related to him by others, implying that he had known Randolph before his death although Barbour would have been a fairly young man:

"He was of moderate stature
And well-formed in measure
With a broad face, pleasant and fair.
Courteous in bearing and debonair
And of fittingly confident bearing.
Loyalty he loved above all things,
Falshood, treason, and felony
He stood against always earnestly.
He exalted honour and liberality
And always strove for righteousness.
In company, he was caring
And therewith even loving
And good knights he loved always,
For if I speak the truth
He was full of good spirits
And made of all the virtues."

—Barbour, John. The Brus.

== Marriage and family ==
Thomas married Isabel, only daughter of Margaret and John Stewart of Bonkyll (killed at the Battle of Falkirk), a brother of James, High Steward of Scotland. They had two sons and two daughters:

- Thomas, 2nd Earl of Moray
- John, 3rd Earl of Moray
- Agnes Randolph, married Patrick, Earl of Dunbar and had no issue
- Isabel (or Geilis) Randolph, married Sir Patrick Dunbar of Cockburn and Stranith and had several children, including George, Earl of Dunbar and John, Earl of Moray; Isabel's husband was the cousin of her sister Agnes' husband and through this relationship Isabel's children inherited the title Earl of March.

Peerage of Scotland
New creation	Earl of Moray; 1312–1332	Succeeded by Thomas Randolph
