= Peter, Lord of Conches and Mehun =

French knight

Peter of Courtenay, Lord of Conches
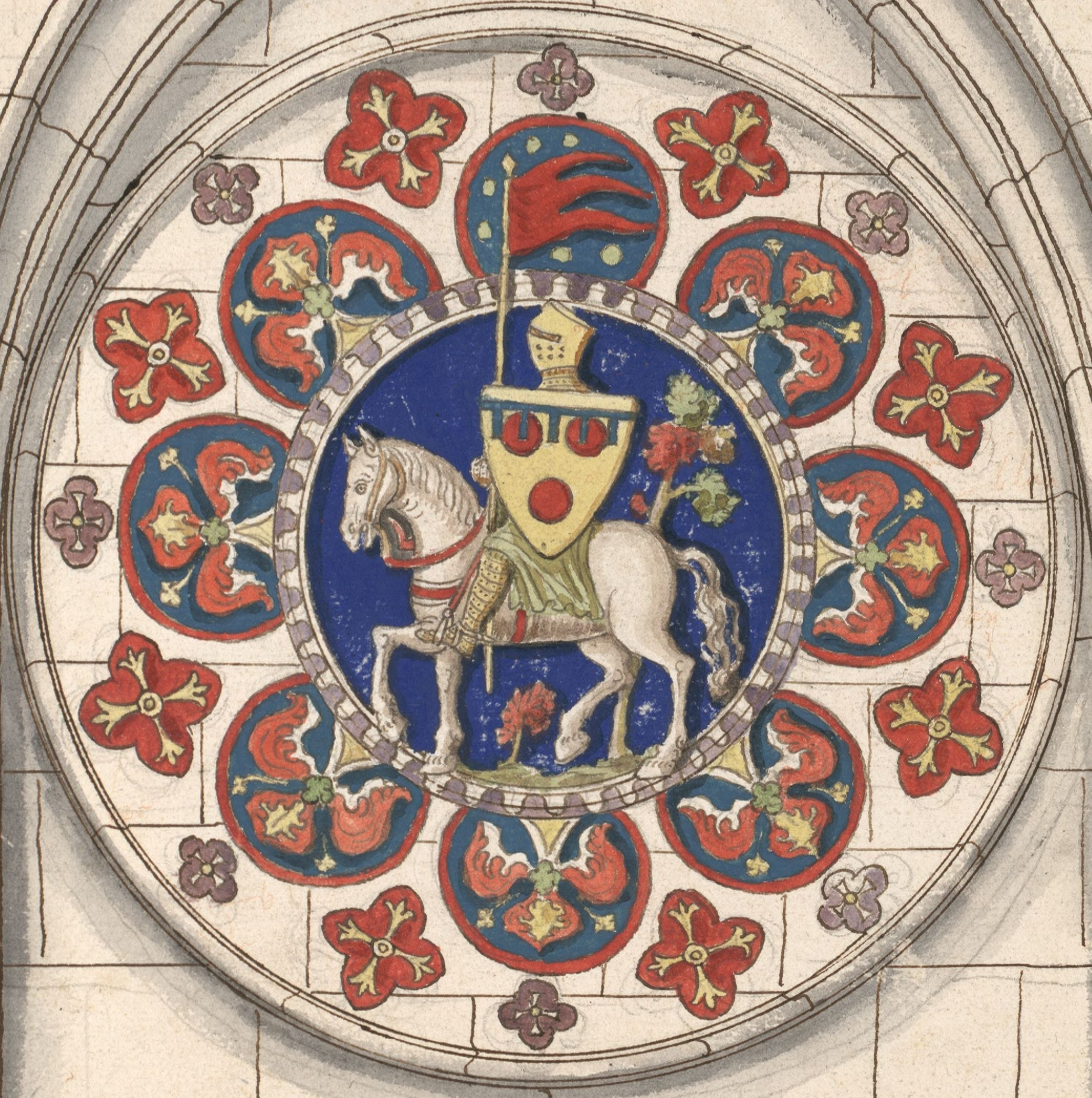
- Pierre of Courtenay, in a 13th century stained glass window in the Chartres Cathedral
- Born: c. 1218
- Died: 1249 or 1250; Egypt, probably Damietta or Al Mansourah
- Noble family: Capetian House of Courtenay
- Spouse: Pétronille of Joigny
- Issue: Amicie de Courtenay
- Father: Robert of Courtenay
- Mother: Matilda of Mehun

Peter of Courtenay (French: Pierre de Courtenay (c. 1218 – 1249 or 1250 in Egypt) was a French knight and a member of the Capetian House of Courtenay, a cadet line of the royal House of Capet. From 1239 until his death, he was the ruling Lord of Conches and Mehun-sur-Yèvre.

== Life ==
Peter was the eldest of five sons of Robert of Courtenay, Lord of Champignelles and his wife Matilda of Mehun. From his parents he inherited the castle of Conches and Mehun. On 25 August 1248, he sailed with his cousin, King Louis IX of France, from Aigues-Mortes to Egypt to fight the Seventh Crusade, during which he died.

Most historians think he died during the battle for the city of Al Mansurah on 8 February 1250. On that day, Count Robert I of Artois led a vanguard of Crusaders in a spontaneous attack on the city. The vanguard was caught in a trap set by the defending Mamluks and all attackers were killed. However, the chronicler Jean de Joinville maintains Peter of Courtenay died on an earlier date. After the conquest of the Egytion port city of Damietta in June 1249, a large part of the crusader army camped outside the city wall, until they were ready to march to Al Mansurah in the autumn. The Sultan of Egypt offered a reward of one gold solidus for the head of each crusader. During the night, Saracens would sneak into the Crusader camp, kill sleeping Crusaders in their tents, and steal their severed heads. According to Joinville, Peter of Courtenay was the victim of one such attack. However, Joinville may be mistaken. One should consider that he wrote his chronicle decades after the fact, and that Peter de Courtenay is mentioned twice later in the chronicle, in connection with the Battle of Al Mansurah.

== Marriage and issue ==
Peter was married to Pétronille (d.1289), a daughter of Gaucher of Joigny and Amicie de Montfort. They had:

- Amicie (d. 1275 in Rome; buried in St. Peter's Basilica), Lady suo jure of Conches and Mehun, married in 1262 to Count Robert II of Artois (d. 1302).

== Sources ==
- Devailly, Guy (1973). Le Berry du X siecle au milieu du XIII (in French). Mouton & Co.
- Dunbabin, Jean (2011). The French in the Kingdom of Sicily, 1266-1305. Cambridge University Press.

Peter, Lord of Conches and Mehun Capetian House of Courtenay Cadet branch of the Capetian dynasty Born: c. 1218 Died: 1249 or 1250
Preceded by Robert I	Lord of Conches; 1239-1250	Succeeded by Robert II jure uxoris
Preceded by Robert I	Lord of Mehun-sur-Yèvre; 1239-1250	Succeeded by Robert II jure uxoris
