= John I of Namur =

French noble (1267–1330)

John I, Marquis of Namur
- John's coin
- Tenure: 1305 - 1330
- Predecessor: Guy of Dampierre
- Successor: John II of Namur
- Born: 1267
- Died: 10 February 1330
- Noble family: Dampierre
- Spouses: Margaret of Clermont; Marie of Artois
- Issue: John II, Marquis of Namur; Guy II, Marquis of Namur; Henry of Namur; Philip III, Marquis of Namur; Blanche, Queen of Sweden and Norway; Marie of Namur; Margaret of Namur; William I, Marquis of Namur; Robert of Namur; Louis of Namur; Elizabeth, Electress Palatine
- Father: Guy of Dampierre
- Mother: Isabelle of Luxembourg

John I (1267 – 10 February 1330) was the count of Namur from 1305 to 1330. He was a member of the House of Dampierre, the son of Guy of Dampierre, Count of Flanders and Marquis of Namur, and his second wife Isabelle of Luxembourg. John was the father of Blanche of Namur, Queen of Sweden and Norway. He was the elder brother of Guy of Namur, whom he sent to command the Flemish rebels against the French Kingdom in the 1302 Battle of the Golden Spurs.

== Life ==
John’s father, Guy of Dampierre, made John the governor of Namur on 5 November 1297. Guy ceded his rights to the county on 2 October 1298, making John the Marquis of Namur.

In 1302, John took over command of the rebellion started by his father, Guy of Dampierre. Together with his younger brother, Guy of Namur, he participated in the Battle of the Golden Spurs.

The French king, Philip IV, attacked the Flemish once again in 1304. John’s half-brother, Philip of Chieti, gathered an army consisting of Flemish soldiers and positioned the army by Mons-en-Pévèle. In the ensuing battle, the Battle of Mons-en-Pévèle, John commanded the left wing of the Flemish army.

In September 1290, John was betrothed to Blanche of France, daughter of Philip III. Instead, John married Margaret of Clermont, daughter of Robert, Count of Clermont and Beatrix, Dame de Bourbon, in 1307. He was Margaret's second husband. She died after two years of marriage, in 1309.

John's second wife was Marie of Artois, daughter of Philip of Artois and Blanche of Brittany. They were married by contract in Paris on 6 March 1310, confirmed Poissy, January 1313. John granted her as dower the castle of Wijnendale in Flanders, ratified by the Count of Flanders (his half-brother, Robert III) in 1313.

John died on 10 February 1330. He was succeeded by his son John II as count of Namur.

== Issue ==
| Name | Lifespan | Notes |
|---|---|---|
| John of Namur; Marquis of Namur | 1310/12 – 2 April 1335 | Succeeded his father in 1330 as John II, Marquis of Namur. Buried at Kloster Spaltheim. |
| Guy of Namur; Marquis of Namur | 1311/13 – 12 March 1336 | Succeeded his brother in 1335 as Guy II, Marquis of Namur. |
| Henry of Namur | 1312/13 – 8 October 1333 | Canon at Chartres Cathedral; canon at Cambrai Cathedral, 1324; canon at Châlons-sur-Marne and Reims, 1325. |
| Philip of Namur; Marquis of Namur | 1319 – September 1337 | Succeeded his brother in 1336 as Philip III, Marquis of Namur. Murdered at Famagusta, Cyprus. |
| Blanche of Namur; Queen consort of Sweden and Norway | 1320 – autumn 1363 | Married 5 November 1335 at Bohus Castle Magnus IV of Sweden. |
| Marie of Namur; Gräfin von Vianden; Dame de Pierrepont | 1322 – before 29 October 1357 | Married firstly, in 1335/36, Henry II, Graf of Vianden, son of Philip II, Graf of Vianden and his first wife Lucia von der Neuerburg. Her first husband was murdered at Famagusta in September 1337. Married secondly (1340, dispensation 9 September 1342) her father's second cousin, Theobald of Bar, Seigneur de Pierrepont, son of Erard of Bar, Seigneur de Pierrepont et d'Ancerville (himself son of Theobald II of Bar), and his wife Isabelle of Lorraine (daughter of Theobald II, Duke of Lorraine). |
| Margaret of Namur | 1323 – 13 September 1383 | A nun at Peteghem. |
| William of Namur; Marquis of Namur | 1324 – 1 October 1391 | Succeeded his brother in 1337 as William I "the Rich", Marquis of Namur. Buried at the Franciscan convent in Namur. Father of William II, Marquis of Namur, and John III, Marquis of Namur, who sold Namur to Philip the Good. |
| Robert of Namur; Seigneur de Beaufort-sur-Meuse et de Renaix | 1325 – 1/29 April 1391 | Seigneur de Beaufort-sur-Meuse et de Renaix; Marshal of Brabant. Married firstly (dispensation 18 October 1354) Isabelle of Hainault, sister of Philippa of Hainault, daughter of William III, Count of Hainault and his wife Joan of Valois. Married secondly (4 February 1380) as her first husband, Isabeau de Melun, heiress of Viane, daughter of Hugues de Melun, Seigneur d'Antoing (died 1409). Robert had two illegitimate children by unknown mistresses. |
| Louis of Namur; Seigneur de Peteghem et de Bailleul | 1325 – 1378/86 | Seigneur de Peteghem et de Bailleul. Flemish counsellor. Governor of Namur 1351. Married on 17 May 1365 Isabelle de Roucy, Dame de Roucy, daughter and heiress of Robert II, Count of Roucy and his wife Marie d'Enghien (-after 1396). |
| Elizabeth of Namur; Electress Palatine | 1329 – 29 March 1382 | Married Rupert I, Elector Palatine, in autumn 1350 or summer 1358. Died without children in Heidelberg. |

== Sources ==
- Bagerius, Henric; Ekholst, Christine (2016). "The Unruly Queen: Blanche of Namur and Dysfunctional Rulership in Medieval Sweden". In Rohr, Zita Eva; Benz, Lisa (eds.). Queenship, Gender, and Reputation in the Medieval and Early Modern West. Palgrave Macmillan.
- Maillard-Luypaert, Monique (2001). Papauté, clercs et laïcs: Le diocèse de Cambrai à l'épreuve du Grand Schisme d'Occident (1378-1417) (in French). PUblications des Facultes universitaires Saint-Louis.307
- Thieme-Becker (2012). "Jean Pepin de Huy". In Hourihane, Colum (ed.). The Grove Encyclopedia of Medieval Art and Architecture. Vol. 2. Oxford University Press.

John I of Namur House of Dampierre Born: 1267 Died: 31 January 1330
| Preceded by Guy I | Marquis of Namur; 1305–1330 | Succeeded by John II |
