= John Randolph, 3rd Earl of Moray =

Joint Regent of Scotland (died 1346)

The Right Honourable John Randolph
- Earl of Moray
- Coat of arms
- Tenure: 1332–1346
- Predecessor: Thomas Randolph, 2nd Earl of Moray
- Successor: Reverted to Crown
- Died: 17 October 1346
- Spouse: Euphemia de Ross
- Father: Thomas Randolph, 1st Earl of Moray
- Mother: Isabella Stewart

John Randolph, 3rd Earl of Moray (died 17 October 1346) was an important figure in the reign of David II of Scotland, and was for a time joint Regent of Scotland.

== Family ==
He was son of the famous Thomas Randolph, 1st Earl of Moray, a companion-in-arms of Robert the Bruce. Upon the death of his elder brother Thomas, 2nd Earl at the Battle of Dupplin Moor in 1332, John succeeded to the earldom. He was brother to Agnes Randolph, Countess of Dunbar, sometimes referred to as "Black Agnes". His sister Isobel's daughter Agnes Dunbar, was the mistress of David II of Scotland.

== Military campaigns ==
He at once took up arms on behalf of his sovereign and cousin King David II and surprised and defeated Edward Balliol at the Battle of Annan in December 1332. At the Battle of Halidon Hill on 19 July 1333, he commanded the first division of the Scots' Army, supported by Sir Andrew Fraser and his two brothers, Simon and James. Escaping from the carnage there he retired to France.

== Regency ==
John returned to Scotland the following year, when he and the High Steward of Scotland (the future King Robert II of Scotland) were appointed joint Regents, and set about trying to restore order to the nation.

He was successful in taking prisoner the Comyn Earl of Atholl, commander of the English forces in Scotland, but, on his swearing allegiance to the Scottish Crown he was set free. Comyn, however, disregarded his oath, returned to the English camp, and resumed his hostilities. In August 1335 led an attack on the Burgh Muir near Edinburgh against a body of Flemish auxiliaries in the English service, under Count Guy de Namur, and forced them to surrender. But escorting the Count to the Borders he fell into an ambush and was made prisoner by William de Pressen, (English) Warden of Jedburgh.

He was confined first at Nottingham Castle, and afterwards in the Tower of London. On 25 July 1340, he was removed to Windsor Castle. In 1341 he was exchanged for the Earl of Salisbury, a prisoner with the French, and Moray then returned to Scotland.

== Last battle ==
In February 1346, he invaded England with David II of Scotland. At the Battle of Neville's Cross, outside Durham, on 17 October 1346, John, with Douglas, Knight of Liddesdale, commanded the right wing of the Scottish army. He was killed during the first English attack.

He was married to Euphemia de Ross but the marriage was childless. On his death the earldom of Moray reverted to the Crown, but was later given to his nephew, John Dunbar.

== In balladry ==
Rupert Ferguson suggests that John Randolph might have provided the inspiration for the attachment of the name Lord Randal to the father of the protagonist in the ballad The Bonny Hynd.

Peerage of Scotland
Preceded by Thomas Randolph	Earl of Moray; 1332–1346	Succeeded by Vacant; Reverted to Crown
