= Philip III of Namur =

Philip III, Marquis of Namur
- Born: 1319
- Died: September 1337 (aged 17–18); Famagusta
- Buried: Franciscan church of Famagusta
- Noble family: House of Dampierre
- Father: John I, Marquis of Namur
- Mother: Mary of Artois

Philip III (1319 – September 1337 in Famagusta) was Count of Namur from 1336 to 1337. He was the fourth son of John I, Marquis of Namur, and Mary of Artois.

== Reign ==
When his older brother Guy was killed in a tournament in Flanders in March 1336, Philip became his successor. At that time, Philip was in Sweden at the court of his sister Blanche of Namur, Queen consort of Sweden and Norway. From there he traveled to the Holy Land via Cyprus, with his brother-in-law Henry II of Vianden.

It is recorded that "Philippus comes Namucensis" (as he was called) donated property to St Alban, in accordance with the testament of "frater noster dominus Guido quondam comes Namucensis", by charter dated 23 Jun 1336.

On his stop-over in Famagusta, he and his companions misbehaved so badly that the citizens of Famagusta decided to kill them all. Philip and the Count of Vianden were buried in the Franciscan church of Famagusta. He was succeeded by his brother William I.

Philip III of Namur House of Dampierre Born: 1319 Died: September 1337
Preceded by Guy II	Marquis of Namur; 1336–1337	Succeeded by William I
