= Patrick von Kalckreuth =

German maritime painter

Patrick von Kalckreuth (1892–1970), born Patrick Dunbar, was a leading German maritime painter.

He was the son of a German naval officer. After a brief career as a seaman, he enrolled in the Prussian Academy of Arts in Berlin and studied with the German painter Hugo Schnars-Alquist.

Kalckreuth lived in both Düsseldorf and Berlin, but frequently spent summers by the North Sea in Cuxhaven. His works generally feature scenes from the North Sea, both scenes of waves crashing along beaches and ships at sea. Kalckreuth's early works, primarily of ships at sea, are heavily influenced by Schnars-Alquist. Later in his career, he focused more on the sea itself, frequently painting seascapes highlighted by crashing waves and sunsets.

After his father's death, his mother remarried Richard von Kalckreuth in 1931. His stepfather adopted Patrick, despite him being aged almost forty, and as a result he changed his last name. Thus, early works of Kalckreuth are signed as Patrick Dunbar, whereas his paintings after 1931 are signed as Patrick von Kalckreuth.

Considered a master maritime painter, his paintings are displayed in several museums and galleries in Hamburg and in the North of Germany, including the Historiches Museum in Bremerhaven.

Patrick von Kalckreuth died in 1970.
