= Amicie de Courtenay =

French noblewoman

- Born: 1250
- Died: 1275 (aged 24–25)
- Noble family: Capetian House of Courtenay
- Spouse: Robert II, Count of Artois
- Issue: Mahaut, Countess of Artois; Philip; Robert
- Father: Peter of Courtenay
- Mother: Pétronille of Joigny

Amicie de Courtenay (1250–1275) was a French noblewoman and a member of the Capetian House of Courtenay, a cadet line of the House of Capet.

Her father was Peter of Courtenay, Lord of Conches and Mehun (1218–1250); he fell in the Battle of Al Mansurah during the Seventh Crusade. Amicie's mother was Pétronille of Joigny, the daughter of Gaucher de Joigny and Amicie de Montfort.

== Marriage and issue ==
She married Count Robert II of Artois (1250-1302); together, they had three children:

- Mahaut (1268–1329)
- Philip (1269–1298)
- Robert (1271–1272)

== Sources ==
- Dunbabin, Jean (2011). The French in the Kingdom of Sicily, 1266–1305. Cambridge University Press.
