= Robert II of Artois =

Count of Artois (1250–1302)

Robert II
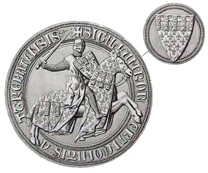

Count of Artois
- Reign: 1250–1302
- Predecessor: Robert I
- Successor: Matilda
- Born: September 1250
- Died: 11 July 1302 (aged 51) near Kortrijk, County of Flanders
- Spouse: Amicie de Courtenay; Agnes of Dampierre; Margaret of Hainaut
- Issue: Mahaut, Countess of Artois; Philip of Artois; Robert
- House: House of Artois
- Father: Robert I of Artois
- Mother: Matilda of Brabant

Robert II (September 1250 – 11 July 1302) was the Count of Artois, the posthumous son and heir of Robert I and Matilda of Brabant. He was a nephew of two kings; Louis IX of France and Charles I of Sicily.

A capable military commander and administrator, Robert was involved in a number of conflicts involving the French Capetian dynasty, including the War of the Sicilian Vespers and the Franco-Flemish War. He died during the latter conflict while leading a French army at the Battle of the Golden Spurs.

== Life ==
A close confidant of the Capetian royal family and experienced soldier, Robert served as a military commander and administrator under the rule of his cousin, Philip III of France and Philip's son, Philip IV. During the former Philip's early reign, he dispatched Robert and a French army to Iberia to suppress a rebellion in the Kingdom of Navarre. At the behest of his uncle, Charles I of Anjou, he led Angevin troops against Ghibelline and Genoese troops in Piedmont. Charles eventually named Robert as his Vicar in Provence, but the latter was ultimately defeated and forced to withdraw.

In 1285, he was named as regent of the Angevin Kingdom of Naples while the kingdom was engaged in the War of the Sicilian Vespers against Aragon. The Angevin kingdom had suffered several major defeats early in the war and the un-crowned king of Naples, Charles II, was an Aragonese prisoner. Robert rebuilt the Angevin treasury and worked to rebuild the Angevin kingdom's navy. Also in 1285, Robert took part in the French-led Aragonese Crusade (which ended in defeat) and attempted an invasion of Sicily in 1287. The release of Charles II from Aragonese custody in 1287 ended his rule as regent of Naples.

In 1288, Robert began work on a great park at Hesdin Castle. The park contained a menagerie, aviaries, fishponds, orchards, an enclosed garden and facilities for tournaments. It also contained mechanical statues including waving monkeys draped in skins.

In 1297, Robert commanded the French army which ambushed and defeated a superior English relief force during the Battle of Bonnegarde during the Gascon War. A few months later he defeated the Flemings in 1297 at the Battle of Furnes. He was again sent into Flanders in July 1302, where he began to ravage the countryside and attempted to take the town of Kortrijk (Courtrai).

=== Death ===
Robert met the Flemish army at the Battle of the Golden Spurs. His infantry advanced with great success against the Flemings (mostly city militia), but he ordered their recall to allow his cavalry to make the final, victorious charge. But on the broken, marshy ground, his knights were unable to gain enough momentum to break the Flemish shieldwall, and they were knocked down and slaughtered. Robert led some of the reserves in a second charge in an attempt to reverse their fortunes. Artois was unhorsed by Willem van Saeftinghe. He and his troops were cut down by the Flemish infantry.

== Family ==
In 1262, in Paris, Robert married Amicie de Courtenay (1250–1275), daughter of Pierre de Courtenay, Seigneur de Conches, a great-grandson of Louis VI, and Perronelle de Joigny. They had three children:

- Mahaut (1268–1329)
- Philip (1269–1298)
- Robert (born 1271, died young).

After Amicie's death, Robert married twice more: first, in 1277, to Agnes of Dampierre (1237–1288), heiress of Bourbon, and then, on 18 October 1298 to Margaret (died 1342), daughter of John II, Count of Hainaut. After Robert's death, his daughter Mahaut inherited Artois, but his grandson Robert III unsuccessfully tried to claim it.

== In popular culture ==
Robert II and his "contrivances for amusement" at Hesdin are depicted in the segment "You’ve Been Artois’d!" from Horrible Histories, season 3, episode 1.

== Sources ==
- Dunbabin, Jean (1991). A Hound of God: Pierre de la Palud and the Fourteenth-Century Church. Oxford University Press.
- Dunbabin, Jean (2011). The French in the Kingdom of Sicily, 1266–1305. Cambridge University Press.
- Funck-Brentano, Frantz (1922). The Middle Ages. Heinemann.
- Henneman, John Bell Jr. (1995). "Artois". In Kibler, William W.; Zinn, Grover A.; Earp, Lawrence (eds.). Medieval France: An Encyclopedia. Routledge.
- Housley, Norman (1992). The Later Crusades, 1274–1580: From Lyons to Alcazar. Oxford University Press.
- Landsberg, Sylvia (1995). The Medieval Garden. Thames and Hudson.
- Macdougall, Elisabeth B., ed. (1986). Medieval Gardens. Dumbarton Oaks.
- Stanton, Charles D. (2019). "BATTLE OF THE COUNTS (23 JUNE 1287)". Roger of Lauria (c.1250-1305): "Admiral of Admirals,". Boydell & Brewer. pp. 198–209. doi:10.2307/j.ctvd58tqg.18.

Robert II of Artois House of Artois Cadet branch of the Capetian dynasty Born: September 1250 Died: 11 July 1302
Preceded by Robert I	Count of Artois; 1250–1302	Succeeded by Mahaut disputed by Robert III
