= Robert of Namur (1323–1391) =

English noble and crusader

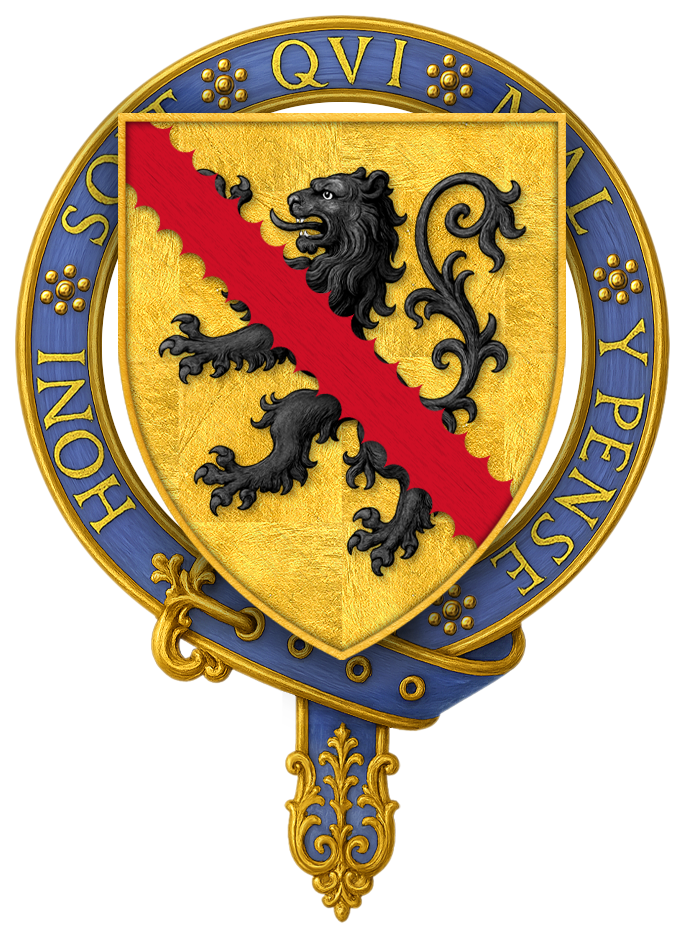
Sir Robert de Namur, KG

Robert of Namur, KG (1323 – April 1391) was a noble from the Low Countries close to King Edward III of England. He was made Knight of the Garter in 1369.

== Early life ==
His was the son of John I, Count of Namur, and Marie, Lady of Merode.

== Career ==
As a young man, he participated in crusades in Prussia and The Holy Land. His uncle Robert III of Artois, which had English sympathies, made him journey in 1346 to Calais to meet Edward III of England, who was besieging the city. Robert made a good impression on the King.

On 30 August 1350, Robert and Henry of Grosmont commanded the English flagship Salle du Roy, at the Battle of Les Espagnols sur Mer, off Winchelsea. On 2 February 1354, Robert of Namur married Isabella of Hainault (1323–1361), younger sister of Philippa of Hainault, queen consort of King Edward III of England. Thus Robert became brother-in-law to Edward III. Robert captured the Escanaffles Castle in 1363. Robert brought Jean Froissart to England, and introduced him to Queen Philippa. In 1369, Robert defended the English camp at Tournehem against French attack. He was made Knight of the Garter in 1369 after the death of Robert d'Ufford, 1st Earl of Suffolk.

In 1370, Robert requested Jean Froissart to write a recent chronicle of the history of England. On 20 August 1371, Robert fought for Wenceslaus I, Duke of Luxembourg and Brabant, commanding 2,000 men at the Battle of Baesweiler, but was defeated and released after paying a ransom. In 1373, Jean Froissart completed his first book of the Chronicles and dedicated it to Robert of Namur.

== Marriage and Children ==
On 2 February 1354, Robert of Namur firstly married Isabella of Hainaut (1323–1361), sister of Queen Philippa of England and daughter of William I, Count of Hainaut and Joan of Valois.
On 4 February 1380, he secondly married Isabeau de Melun (died 1409). Both marriages remained childless, but Robert is said to have had 9 illegitimate children.
