= Battle of Furnes =

1297 battle of the Franco-Flemish War

- Part of the Franco-Flemish War
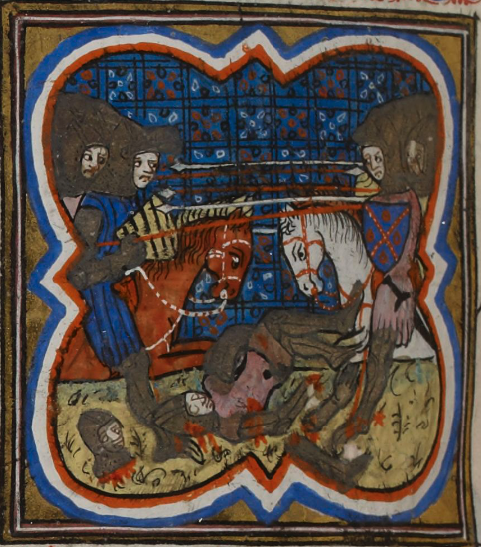
Date	20 August 1297
Location	Bulskamp, Veurne (Furnes) 51°04′N 2°40′E
Result	French victory

Belligerents
Kingdom of France	County of Flanders

Commanders and leaders
Robert II of Artois	William the elder of Jülich †
- Location within Belgium

The Battle of Furnes, also known as Battle of Veurne and Battle of Bulskamp, was fought on 20 August 1297 between French and Flemish forces in the opening stage of the Franco-Flemish War. The war started in January 1297 when Guy, Count of Flanders renounced his vassalage to King Philip IV. The Flemish count organized a defense of his county in anticipation of a French offensive and counted on his alliance with King Edward I to defeat the French. In June 1297 the French army invaded the County of Flanders but the English king could not send reinforcements before August.

A French army under the command of the king's brother Charles of Valois and Raoul de Nesle lay siege before Lille and raiding parties terrorized the wide environments of Lille. In August one such raiding party under the command of Robert II of Artois conquered the towns of Cassel, Sint-Winoksbergen, Mardyck and Dunkirk and then marched towards Veurne, where on 20 August they met a Flemish army under the command of William the elder of Julich. Although the Flemish army was larger, it was defeated by the French. William was captured and died a few days later of his battle wounds. The Flemish army lost more than two hundred man and fourteen Flemish knights were taken prisoner.

Robert's son Philip was also gravely wounded during the battle and died a year later of his wounds.
