= Guy II of Namur =

Guy II, Marquis of Namur
- Born: c. 1312
- Died: 12 March 1336 (aged 23–24); Flanders
- Noble family: House of Dampierre
- Father: John I, Marquis of Namur
- Mother: Marie of Artois

Guy II (c. 1312 – 12 March 1336) was Count of Namur from 1335 to 1336.

He was the second son of John I, Marquis of Namur, and Mary of Artois.

== Life ==
He participated in 1332 on the side of the Count of Flanders against the Duke of Brabant, in the war over Mechelen. He succeeded his brother John II as Count of Namur on 2 April 1335. Under influence of his younger brother Robert of Namur, he recognized King Edward III of England as his Lord, in exchange for a pension.

He also participated in the Second War of Scottish Independence with 300 men, but was surprised by a larger Scottish force under John Randolph, 3rd Earl of Moray in the Battle of Boroughmuir. Guy was taken prisoner, but released for ransom. After his return to Namur, he participated in a tournament in Flanders, where he was mortally wounded.

He was succeeded by his younger brother Philip.

Guy II of Namur House of Dampierre Born: 1312 Died: 12 March 1336
Preceded by John II	Marquis of Namur; 1335–1336	Succeeded by Philip III
