= Amicie de Montfort =

French noblewoman and nun (before 1210 – 1253)

Amicie de Montfort (before 1210 – 1253) was a French noblewoman and nun. In the Montfort family, which had many people called Simon or Amicie, she became widely known as the daughter of the man, Simon de Montfort, 5th Earl of Leicester, who fought in the Albigensian Crusade in France.

== Biography ==
Amicie was the fifth child and third daughter born to Simon de Montfort (c. 1175–1218) and Alice de Montmorency (sometimes spelled Alix). (Amicie's first name is also spelled Amicia or Amice.) Her father held the titles Seigneur de Montfort-l'Amory in the Île-de-France, Count of Leicester (in England). After the Albigensian Crusade in the south of France, Simon received the additional titles of Viscount of Carcassonne and Béziers, Sire of Albi and Razes, Count of Toulouse and Duke of Narbonne. On her mother's side, Amicie was related to the dynasties of the Plantagenets and Capetians. Her uncle Mathieu II de Montmorency was constable of France from 1218, and her younger brother Simon V de Montfort, 6th Earl of Leicester and Chester, was the first Lord Protector of England and son-in-law of King Henry III of England.

In 1211, in Montpellier, for political reasons, Peter II of Aragon agreed to the marriage of Amicie to his son James, who later became King of Aragon, Spain, under the name James I the Conqueror. Peter handed the young infant James into the hands of the Montfort count as a pledge of his loyalty and agreed to let him live and learn the arts of chivalry in France. When Peter II of Aragon died in battle on 12 September 1213, James was only six years old. According to the agreement, he lived in Carcassonne, France, under the care of Montfort. At first, Count de Montfort refused to let James go to Aragon, but Pope Innocent III, at the request of the Aragonese nobles, demanded that he give the boy to the papal legate Pietro di Mora. In this way, Amicie lost her fiance and the crown of Aragon.

By May 1226, she was married to Gauthier II de Joigny, Seigneur of Châteaurenard (ca. 1161–1237). He was the second son of Renaud IV, Comte de Joigny, and Countess Adélaïde de Nevers. He received the position of Seneschal of Nevers at the court of his mother's relatives — the counts of Courtenay, Nevers, Tonner and Auxerre. It was the second marriage for Gauthier.

They had a daughter and a son:

- Petronilla (Perenel) (died 1289), Dame de Sully and Chateaurenard, named after her mother's older sister. In the first marriage (June 1249) the wife of Pierre de Courtenay, Seigneur of Concha (killed in Egypt 1250); in the second (December 1252) — Henri II (ca. 1234-1269), Sire de Sully.
- Gauthier (died 1249), a monk.

In 1240, after the death of her husband, Amicie founded a Dominican abbey near the town of Montargie, located in Gatineau on the Loire River, 17 km from Chateaurenard. Eleanor Plantagenet, the wife of Amicie's brother Simon V de Montfort, also entered this nunnery after her husband's death. Amicie de Montfort died on 20 February 1253.

Amicie and her French descendants were unable to exploit their ownership of Leicester, England, because of hostilities between England and France at that time. However the family continued their claim and it was later proven by the 6th Earl, Simon de Montfort.
