= Arthur Coadou =

Arthur Marie Marcel Coadou
- Born: 7 February 1897; Saint-Brieuc, France
- Died: 22 October 1985 (aged 88); Saint-Raphaël, France
- Military career
- Allegiance: France
- Branch: Aviation
- Rank: Sous lieutenant
- Units: 1e Groupe d'Aviation; Escadrille C.59; Escadrille N.88
- Commands: Escadrille Spa.88
- Awards: Legion d'honneur Croix de Guerre with six palmes and an etoile d'argent Mentioned in Dispatches four times

Sous lieutenant Arthur Marie Marcel Coadou was a French World War I flying ace credited with nine confirmed aerial victories out of his fifteen combat claims.

== Early life ==
Arthur Marie Marcel Coadou was born in Saint-Brieuc on 7 February 1894.

== World War I ==
After Coadou volunteered for military for the war's duration, he was sent to aviation training on 1 July 1915. On 22 September, he transferred onward to Etampes for pilot training.

On 19 January 1916, he was awarded Military Pilot's Brevet No. 2445. Five days later, he was forwarded to 13e Groupe d'Aviation. On 1 February, he was promoted to Caporal. On 29 April 1916, he was posted to Escadrille C59 (the 'C' denoting squadron use of Caudron two-seater observation planes). On 16 July, Coadou was promoted to Sergeant.

On 25 January 1917, he began further training. On 4 May, he was assigned to Escadrille 88 to fly Spad fighter aircraft. On 1 October 1917, he was promoted to Adjutant.

Coadou scored his first verified aerial victory on 19 May 1918, near Grisolles. On 1 August 1918, he downed a German Fokker D.VII. On the 30th, he was wounded in action. It could not have been serious, as he was aloft and successful on 4 September, sharing a win with François Delzenne. Coadou would continue to score through the end of the war, although surviving documentation is sketchy for his record for the last two months of the war. When the Armistice was called hostilities to a halt, Coadou had flown 732 hours and fought in 59 dogfights.

== Post World War I ==
On 28 March 1919, Arthur Marie Marcel Coadou was appointed a Chevalier in the Legion d'honneur as recognition of his wartime service.

As of 19 October 1931, Coadou was listed in the French Civil Aircraft Registry as owner of a civil aircraft, Farman 232 tail code FALLS.

Coadou later served in World War II.
