= Gabriel Thomas (aviator) =

Gabriel Joseph Thomas
- Born: 4 January 1896; Ligré, France
- Died: After 4 January 1950
- Military career
- Allegiance: France
- Branch: Aviation
- Rank: Capitaine
- Units: Escadrille 391; Escadrille 98; Escadrille N.88
- Awards: Legion d'Honneur; Croix de Guerre; Mentioned in dispatches

Capitaine Gabriel Joseph Thomas (born 4 January 1896, date of death unknown) was a World War I flying ace credited with seven aerial victories.

== Biography ==
See also Aerial victory standards of World War I

Gabriel Joseph Thomas was born on 4 January 1896 in Ligré, France.

On 9 November 1914, Thomas enlisted in the French military for four years and was assigned to 2e Groupe d'Aviation. On 11 July 1915, he reported for pilot's training; on 5 October he graduated with his Military Pilot's Brevet. On 8 October, he received orders for Escadrille 98 T in the Dardanelles. On 29 October, those orders were countermanded, and he was posted to Escadrille N.391, which was attached to the Armee d'Orient in the Middle East. He served with this squadron until he transferred back to 2e Groupe d'Aviation in France on 8 July 1916. His Middle Eastern exploits were Mentioned in dispatches on 16 October 1916.

On 8 May 1917, he was returned to combat, assigned to fly a Nieuport fighter with Escadrille N.88. On 5 December 1917, he was provisionally appointed as a Sous lieutenant.

Beginning 12 April 1918, Thomas began to shoot down single German airplanes. His fifth victory came on 24 August. Then, on 2 September, Thomas was so severely wounded he was medically evacuated. While he was in hospital, on 24 September 1918, he was appointed to the Legion d'honneur as a Chevalier. He returned to his squadron in time to shoot down two more Germans, on 23 and 28 October 1918. Those were his last victories before the 11 November ceasefire.

Thomas had ended the war with the Croix de Guerre with five palmes and an etoile de vermeil to go with his Legion d'honneur. His rank was confirmed on 25 October 1919, followed by promotion to Lieutenant on 26 September 1923.

On 1 August 1928, he was raised to the post of Officier in the Legion d'honneur. He was still in military service, as he was promoted to Capitaine in the reserves on 9 June 1937. Thomas' military service would continue until he was finally discharged on 4 January 1950.
