= Matilda of Béthune =

Countess consort of Flanders (died 1264)

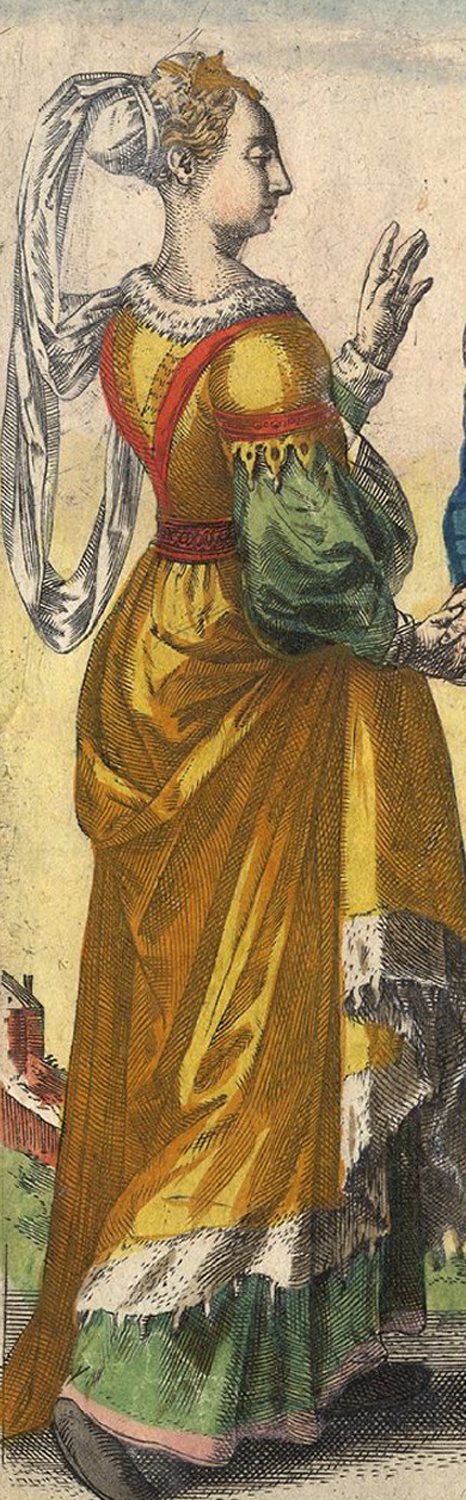
- Matilda of Béthune
- Died: 8 November 1263
- Buried: Flines Abbey
- Noble family: Bethune
- Spouse: Guy, Count of Flanders
- Issue Detail: Mary; Robert III, Count of Flanders; William; John of Flanders; Baldwin; Margaret of Flanders, Duchess of Brabant
- Father: Robert VII, Lord of Béthune
- Mother: Elisabeth of Morialmé

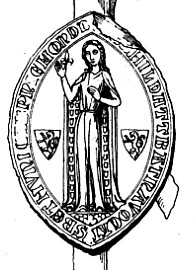

Matilda of Béthune (died 8 November 1264), was a noblewoman from Artois who became countess of Flanders by marriage to Guy, Count of Flanders. She was heiress to her father's titles as Lady of Béthune, of Dendermonde, of Richebourg and of Warneton, as well as Advocatess of the Abbey of Saint Vaast at Arras, and the ruler of these states in 1248–1264. She was the mother of Robert, Count of Flanders, known as Robert of Béthune after his mother.

== Life ==
Matilda (Note: Also referred to as Mathilde and Mahaut.) was born about 1230, the first child of Robert VII, and Elizabeth, daughter of Arnulf IV, last Lord of Morialmé.

=== Countess ===
Matilda was engaged to Guy of Dampierre, who was made co-ruler of Flanders by his widowed mother Margaret II, Countess of Flanders alongside her and his elder brother William III of Dampierre, who died in 1251. In recognition of this important match for his eldest daughter, Robert of Béthune endowed her with the major part of his lands and titles.

In October 1245, Matilda still under age and unmarried, was made heir to the ancient lands of his ancestors outside Béthune, the Pays de l'Alleu in which he held power of life and death. The marriage contract was signed on 2 February 1246 and the wedding then took place in Béthune. On 24 June 1248 Robert and Elizabeth wrote a letter to Guy and Matilda confirming that the two would inherit his lands and titles, which happened shortly after when news reached France of Robert's death.

Matilda then became Lady of Béthune, of Dendermonde, of Richebourg, and of Warneton, as well as Advocatess of the Abbey of Saint Vaast at Arras. By marriage, Guy called himself Lord of these holdings and Advocate, which he was doing by October 1249.

=== Death and legacy ===
Matilda died 8 November 1264 and was buried in a tomb of black marble in the Chapel of Saint Hubert within the abbey church of Flines-lez-Raches.

== Issue ==
Matilda and Guy had:

- Mary (d. 1297) married:
  1. in 1266 William of Jülich (d. 16 March 1278), son of William IV, Count of Jülich. Their son William of Jülich, known as William the Younger, died in 1304 in the Battle of Mons-en-Pévèle.
  2. in 1285 Simon II of Châteauvillain (d. 28 June 1305), Lord of Arc-en-Barrois and Brémur-et-Vaurois, with whom she had eight children.
- Robert III (1249–1322), who succeeded as Count of Flanders
- William (after 1249 – 1311), Lord of Dendermonde and Richebourg, married in 1286 Alice, daughter of Ralph II of Clermont and had children.
- John (1250 – 4 October 1290), was made Bishop of Metz and then Bishop of Liège
- Baldwin (1252–1296).
- Margaret (c. 1253 – 3 July 1285), married in 1273 John I, Duke of Brabant
- Beatrice (c. 1260 – 5 April 1291), married c. 1270 Floris V, Count of Holland
- Philip (c. 1263 – November 1318), Count of Teano, married:
  1. in 1284 Matilda (d. 1303), Countess of Chieti, daughter of Ralph of Courtenay, Count of Teano and Loreto.
  2. c. 1305 Petronella (d. c. 1335), daughter of Geoffrey of Milly, who had three children.

== Sources ==
- Barbiche, Bernard; de Dainville-Barbiche, Ségolène (2014). Sully L'homme et ses fidèles (in French). Fayard. ISBN 9782213648774.374
- Pollock, M.A. (2015). Scotland, England and France After the Loss of Normandy, 1204-1296: 'Auld Amitie'. The Boydell Press. ISBN 978 1 84383 992 7.
- Welkenhuysen, A. (1975). "A Latin Link in the Flemish Chain: the Reynardus Vulpes, its Authorship and Date". In Rombauts, Edward; Welkenhuysen, Andries (eds.). Aspects of the Medieval Animal Epic: Proceedings of the International Conference, Louvain, May 15-17, 1972. Leuven University Press. pp. 113–128. ISBN 90 6186 025 3.
