= Flines Abbey =

Former French Cistercian nunnery

Coordinates: 50°25′24″N 3°10′21″E

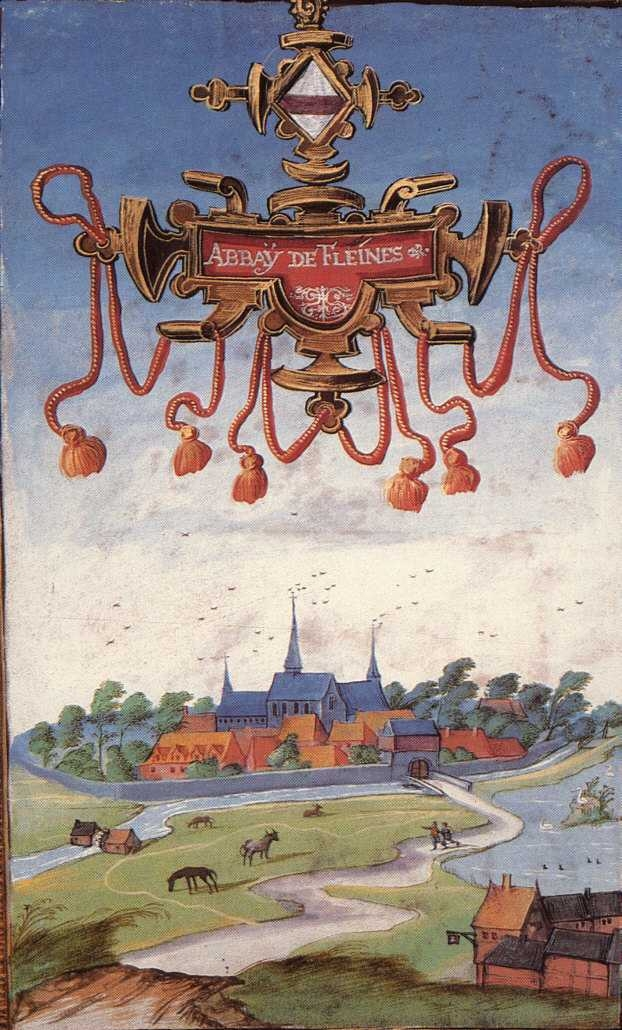
Flines Abbey from the south, in the cartulary of the Duke of Croÿ (probably 1603)

Flines Abbey (French: Abbaye de Flines; also L'Honneur Notre-Dame de Flines) was a Cistercian nunnery in Flines-lez-Raches near Douai, in the Nord department of France. It was founded in about 1234 by Countess Margaret of Flanders, and served as the burial place not only of Margaret in 1278 but of Margaret's husband William II of Dampierre (body transferred to Saint-Dizier in 1257) and their son Guy, Count of Flanders (1304), as well as of Guy's wives Matilda of Béthune (1263) and Isabelle of Luxembourg (1298).

The abbey was damaged in the conflicts between France and Flanders, being devastated in the Battle of Mons-en-Pévèle in 1304. Restoration work was completed in the 14th century, resulting in a precinct of 14 hectares.

Large parts of the abbey were rebuilt under Abbess Jeanne de Boubais (1507–1533), including the church, cloister, guest accommodation and kitchens. The cruciform church was 222 feet long by 105 feet across the transepts, and had a wooden tower. Work continued under Jacqueline de Lalaing (1533–1561), who rebuilt the abbess's house on a grand scale.

These buildings were remodelled under Ernestine Obert (1691–1695), with the church being reworked in the classical style. The stained glass and murals were replaced by plain work, and the timber crossing tower with a stone one. An additional tower was also built at the west end. Work proceeded into the 18th century. Placide Ricart (1696–1731) remodelled the refectory and dormitory, and began work on the infirmary. She also rebuilt the abbey's farms, which had been damaged in the War of the Spanish Succession, and erected a Calvary Cross. Isabelle de Gomicourt (1731–1738) completed the infirmary and Calvary. Ernestine de Thiennes de Rumbecke (1739–1757) reconstructed the abbess's house and guest quarters.

The abbey owned farms in Faumont, Nomain, Coutiches, Cantin, Lambersart and Howardries (Belgium).

The abbey was dissolved in the French Revolution. General Drouot requested the demolition of the abbey buildings in 1794, fearing they could be used as a stronghold by Austrian forces. However, there was a long-running dispute over the legality of the buildings' sale, leading to the mayor of Flines posting guards around the site in 1805 to prevent demolition. That March, the Bureau des Domaines confirmed the right to demolish the church and work commenced, though some buildings were still standing in 1830. The last remains disappeared in the middle of the 19th century.
