= Comité flamand de France =

French learned society

- Abbreviation: CFF
- Motto: Moedertael en Vaderland
- Established: 10 April 1853 (172 years ago)
- Founders: Edmond de Coussemaker, Louis de Backer, Raymond de Bertrand, Auguste Ricour, Hippolyte Bernaert, Pierre Meneboo
- Founded at: Dunkirk
- Types: learned society, publisher
- Legal status: association under the French law of 1901
- Headquarters: Hazebrouck
- Country: France
- Website: www.comiteflamanddefrance.fr

The Flemish Committee of France is a French association, constituted as a scholarly and cultural society with publishing responsibilities. It is dedicated to the study, preservation and dissemination of Flemish culture in French Flanders, with particular emphasis on language, literature and history.

Founded on 10 April 1853 in Dunkirk as the Comité flamand de France, (Note: Although the founding members of the Comité flamand de France did not formally designate a vernacular name for their learned society, several historical West Flemish appellations can nonetheless be identified, including Vlaemsch Comiteit van Vrankryk and Vlaemsch Comiteyt van Vrankryk. Of these, Vlaemsch Comiteit van Vrankryk, as employed by the Flemish poet Prudens van Duyse, is preferable, as it adheres more closely to contemporary Dutch orthographic conventions while exhibiting fewer dialectal idiosyncrasies. Regarding the standard Dutch rendition, the designation advanced by the late Jaak J.H. Veltmans, former chairman of the Algemeen Nederlands Verbond, Vlaams Komitee van Frankrijk, represents a more modern and linguistically conventional alternative to that proposed by the Frisian dialectologist Johan Winkler, Vlaamsch Genootschap van Frankrijk.) bearing the motto Moedertael en Vaderland as of 1 July, (Note: The Dutch motto, which may be rendered literally as "Mother Tongue and Fatherland," encapsulates the guiding principles and cultural aspirations that underpinned the establishment of the Comité flamand de France. It denotes both a deliberate linguistic affirmation and a strong sense of allegiance to regional identity and cultural heritage. Moreover, a comparison between this motto and the designation adopted in 1845 by a comparable learned society in East Flanders—the Société littéraire flamande voor Moedertael en Vaderland de Deynze— while French was Belgium’s only official language, reveals clear and notable resemblances in terms of cultural values and orientation toward linguistic rights.) the society emerged under the leadership of Edmond de Coussemaker at a time, when the use of the Flemish language remained a delicate matter in the region. It has operated continuously under this French designation since its inception and, through the publication of a bulletin and annals, as well as the organisation of lectures, ranks among the oldest learned societies in France.

The committee is based in Hazebrouck, where it maintains a special library that houses its own publications alongside a collection of regional works. It is also entrusted with the custodianship of the collections of the Jeanne Devos Museum in Wormhout.
