= John of Flanders =

Roman Catholic bishop

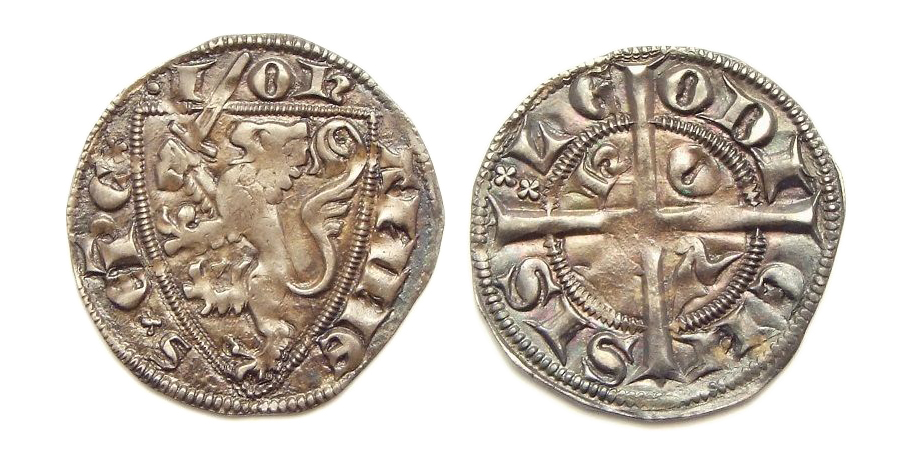
Sterling of John of Flanders, struck in Huy

John of Flanders (c. 1250 – 14 October 1292), also known as John of Dampierre, was the third son of the Count of Flanders and Namur Guy of Dampierre from his first marriage with Matilda of Béthune, and brother of Robert of Béthune. He is not to be confused with his half brother John I, Marquis of Namur.

Having studied law at Paris, John of Flanders was Bishop of Metz in 1280–1282, then Prince-bishop of Liège in 1282–1291. He died at Anhaive Castle in Jambes and is buried at Flines Abbey near Douai.
