= Treaty of Montreuil =

Treaty of Montreuil may refer to:

- Treaty of Montreuil (1274) between England and Flanders
- Treaty of Montreuil (1299) between England and France
