= Charles Orton =

English cricketer and soldier (1910–1940)

Personal information
- Full name: Charles Talbot Orton
- Born: 9 August 1910; Farnham, Surrey, England
- Died: 28 May 1940 (aged 29) near Wormhout, Nord-Pas-de-Calais, France
- Batting: Right-handed
- Bowling: Slow left-arm orthodox

Domestic team information
- Years: Team
- 1938/39: Europeans

Career statistics
Competition	First-class
Matches	4
Runs scored	55
Batting average	27.50
100s/50s	0/0
Top score	22*
Balls bowled	466
Wickets	12
Bowling average	26.50
5 wickets in innings	1
10 wickets in match	0
Best bowling	7/51
Catches/stumpings	1/–
- Source: ESPNcricinfo, 15 January 2019
- Cause of death: Execution by gunshot

Charles Talbot Orton (9 August 1910 – 28 May 1940) was an English first-class cricketer and British Army officer. Serving in the Royal Warwickshire Regiment, Orton played first-class cricket in both England and British India. He served in the early stages of the Second World War, and was likely a victim of the Wormhoudt massacre in May 1940.

== Early life and military career ==
Orton was born at Farnham to Major-general Sir Ernest Orton and his wife Lady Orton. He was educated at Tonbridge School, and after completing his education decided to follow in his fathers footsteps by joining the British Army. He graduated from the Sandhurst in August 1931 and was commissioned into the Royal Warwickshire Regiment as a second lieutenant. He made two appearances in first-class cricket for the British Army cricket team in 1937 against Oxford University and Cambridge University. Besides representing the army, he also played cricket for Aldershot Command, Catterick Garrison and the Yellowhammers. He was promoted to lieutenant in August 1934. He later married Margaret Stewart Rigg of Iverna Court, Kensington.

Orton was subsequently posted to British India, where he played two first-class matches for the Europeans in November 1938, against the Parsees and the Muslims at Bombay in the Bombay Quadrangular. He in the match against the Muslims, Orton took a five wicket haul in the Muslims first-innings, with figures of 7/51; however, it was not enough to stop to the Muslims winning the match by 97 runs. Returning to England, he was promoted to the rank of captain just days before the beginning of the Second World War.

== Second World War and death ==
Orton was posted to France in September 1939, where he served during the Battle of France with the second battalion of the Royal Warwickshire Regiment, in May 1940 the battalion formed part of the rearguard stalling the German advance on Dunkirk. Holding the line on the Comines Canal and the Escaut, the battalion was eventually overrun and forced to surrender on 28 May. Taken prisoner, Orton along with men from the Cheshire Regiment, Royal Artillery and the French Army, were taken to a barn outside Wormhout. It was here on the same day that 80 men, including Orton, were massacred by soldiers from the 2nd Battalion, Leibstandarte SS Adolf Hitler. He is buried at the Dozinghem Military Cemetery.
