= Edmond de Coussemaker =

French musicologist and ethnologist (1805–1876)

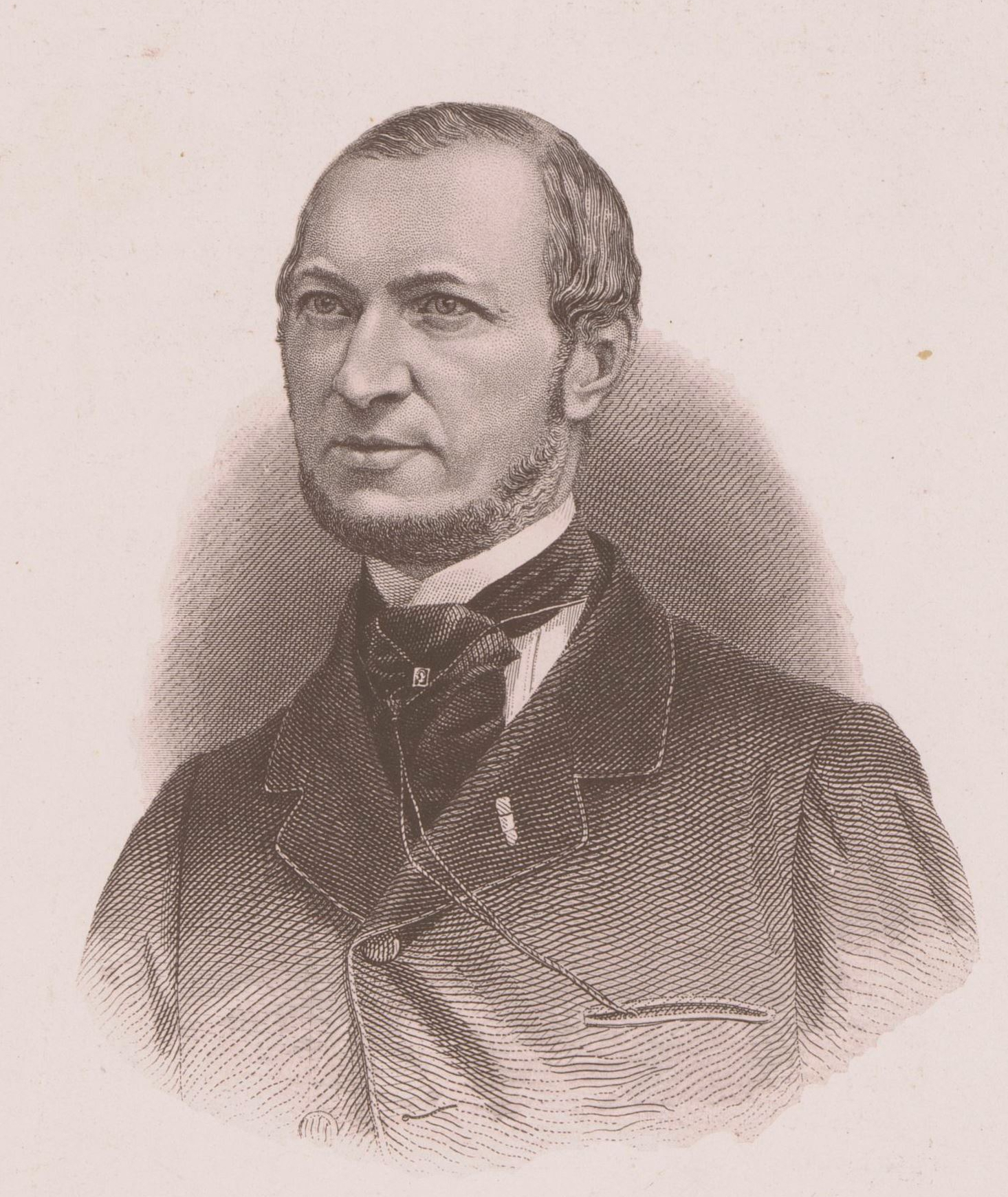
Sketch of Charles Edmond Henri de Coussemaker by Louis-Joseph-Isnard Desjardins, c. 1880

Charles Edmond Henri de Coussemaker (19 April 1805 – 10 January 1876) was a French musicologist and ethnologist focusing mainly on the cultural heritage of French Flanders. His early publication of medieval music within the Scriptorum de musica medii aevi (1864–1876) was among the most important early music events predating its 20th-century revival.

== Biography ==
=== Jurist and musician ===
He was born in Belle, Hauts-de-France, into a family of jurists on 19 April 1805. At the Dowaai grammar school, he studied violin with Joseph Baudouin and singing and harmony with Moreau, who was an organist at Saint Peter's Church. In 1825, his father sent him to Paris to study law. At the same time, de Coussemaker started studying musical composition with Antonin Reicha and vocal arts with Felice Pellegrini, who performed Rossini’s operas in Paris at that time. De Coussemaker visited the salons of the Countesses Merlin, Méroni and de Sparre.

After having obtained his certificate in December 1830, de Coussemaker became a trainee in Dowaai, where in 1832 he took up the thread of his studies in counterpoint with Victor Lefebvre. He wanted to improve his religious music; de Coussemaker later wrote a cappella: Kyrie, Sanctus, O Salutaris and Agnus dei, in imitation of Alexandre-Étienne Choron.

In the summer of 1832, Coussemaker set up a Société d’émulation musicale (lit. 'Society for Musical Competition') to play his own pieces of music and those of Victor Lefebvre, Henri Brovellio, Charles Choulet and Amédée Thomassin. From 1840 to 1843, he invited several people, such as violinist Henri Vieuxtemps and oboist player Stanislas Verroust, to perform. On 5 December 1832, his Air varié for oboe, Chant for two voices a cappella and Air for soprano were performed with the accompaniment of orchestras. He also left manuscripts such as an essay about musical composition and fugue and an essay about harmony, which have apparently both been lost.

In 1835, the opera Le Diamant perdu (lit. 'The Lost Diamond') was performed. He left the composition of another opera, Imogène, unfinished. In 1836, in Belle, he married Marie Ignard de la Mouillère, to whom he dedicated a whole series of Romances during their period of engagement. He became a judge at the District Court of Sint-Winoksbergen in 1843, after which he was appointed to the Court of Hazebrouck in 1845. Eventually, he became a judge in Rijsel in 1858. In 1874, he was elected mayor and maire of Bourbourg, his last residence.

He was a member of the Académie royale de Belgique and a correspondent for the Institut de France and the Académie des Inscriptions et des Belles-Lettres. His library included 1600 books and musical instruments, part of which came into the possession of the Royal Library of Belgium in Brussels (Koninklijke Bibliotheek van België).

=== Flemish Committee of France ===
Based on a report by Hippolyte Fortoul, Minister of Education and Religion, Napoleon III signed a decree on 13 September 1852 ordering a compilation of popular French poetry to be published. Inspired by Barzaz Breiz: Chants populaires de la Bretagne, published by Théodore Hersart de La Villemarqué from 1839 onwards, de Coussemaker—as a correspondent for the Committee of Language, History and the Arts of France—collected the songs of his region.

De Coussemaker founded the Flemish Committee of France (Note: Comité flamand de France) in 1853, which was tasked with preserving the West Flemish dialect of the Dutch language, as spoken in French Flanders. With the priest Jules Auguste Lemire, he tried the education in Catholic schools.

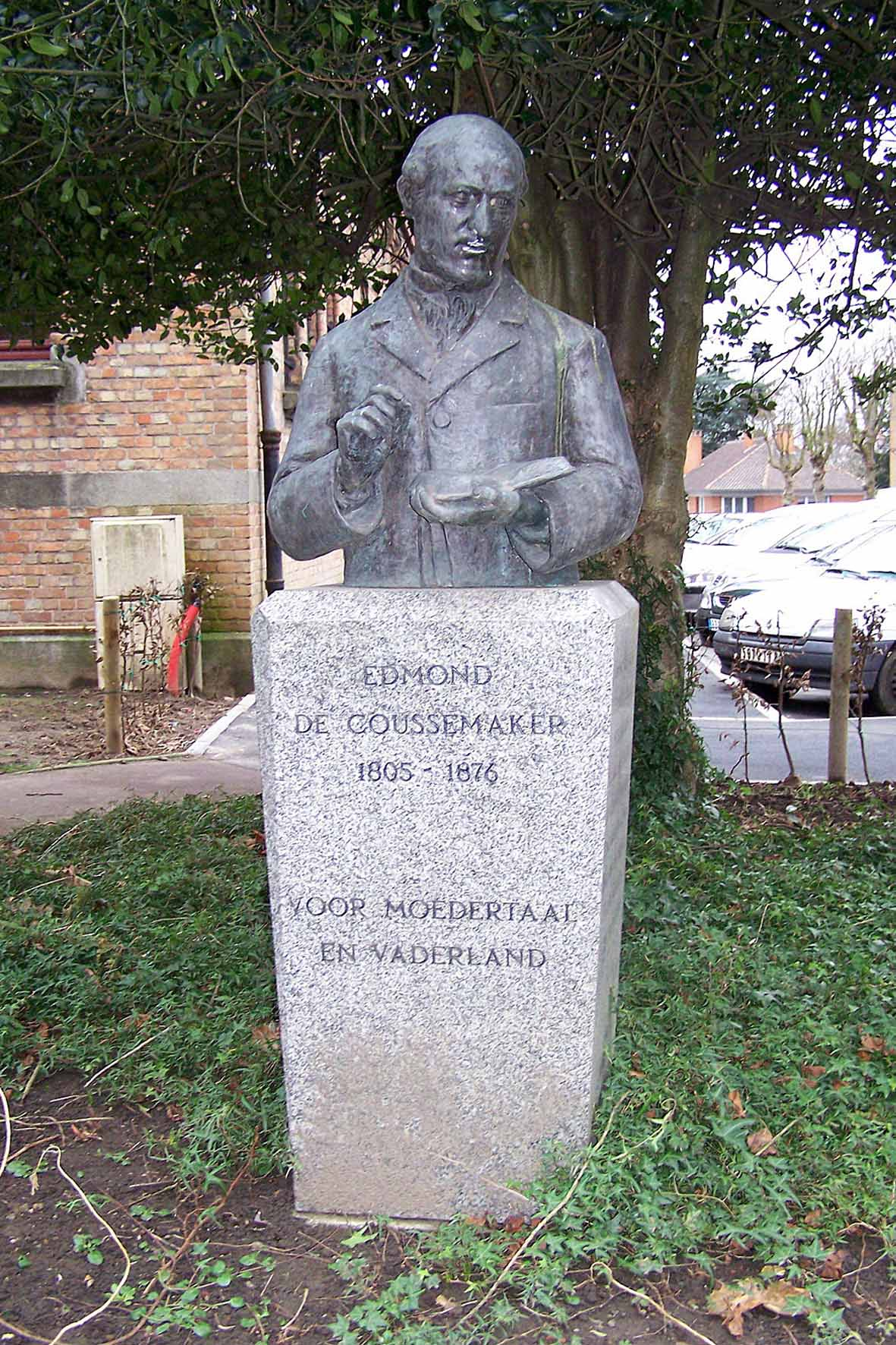
Buste of Edmond de Coussemaker in Bailleul, France

Defending the idea of a constitutional monarchy, he rose to the position of General Counsellor of the Nord (now the French region Nord-Pas-de-Calais). Volume IV of his Scriptores de musica medii aevi was about to be issued, but, as his daughter Lilia wrote the day he died in Lille on 10 January 1876, it was exhausted by his affairs. De Coussemaker died in Bourbourg. Most of his archives and manuscripts disappeared after the town hall of Belle burned down in 1918.

== Musicology ==
His musical style was oriented towards gothic romanticism in the troubadour style. He was interested in medieval music after reading the Belgian musicologist François-Joseph Fétis’s Revue musicale (musical revue). The first musicological work by de Coussemaker dates back to 1835. His compilations, Scriptorum de musica medii aevi, 1864–1876, continued the works of Martin Gerbert.

His publications focused on subjects such as the Gregorian chant, neumatic and measured notation, medieval instruments and the theory and polyphony he called harmony.

From the original musical sources he had collected, he drew up descriptions based on attentive observation, resulting in his being criticised. He proved the scientific value of facsimiles of manuscripts, but he also made his own transcriptions into modern notation. He established several critical editions of ancient music, including liturgical dramas from the Middle Ages and works by Adam de la Halle.

== Publications ==
- Hucbald moine de St.-Amand et ses traités de musique (1839–1841)
- Histoire de l'harmonie au Moyen Âge (1852)
- Chants populaires des Flamands de France (1856)
- Les Harmonistes des XII et XIII siècles (1864)
- Œuvres complètes du trouvère Adam de la Halle (1872)
- Scriptorum de musica medii aevi (4 vols.) (1864–1876)

=== Recordings ===
- Edmond de Coussemaker, Romances et chansons. With Maryse Collache (soprano), Damien Top (ténor) and Eric Hénon (piano). Symphonic Productions SyPr 041 2005.
