= Raimbeaucourt =

- Commune
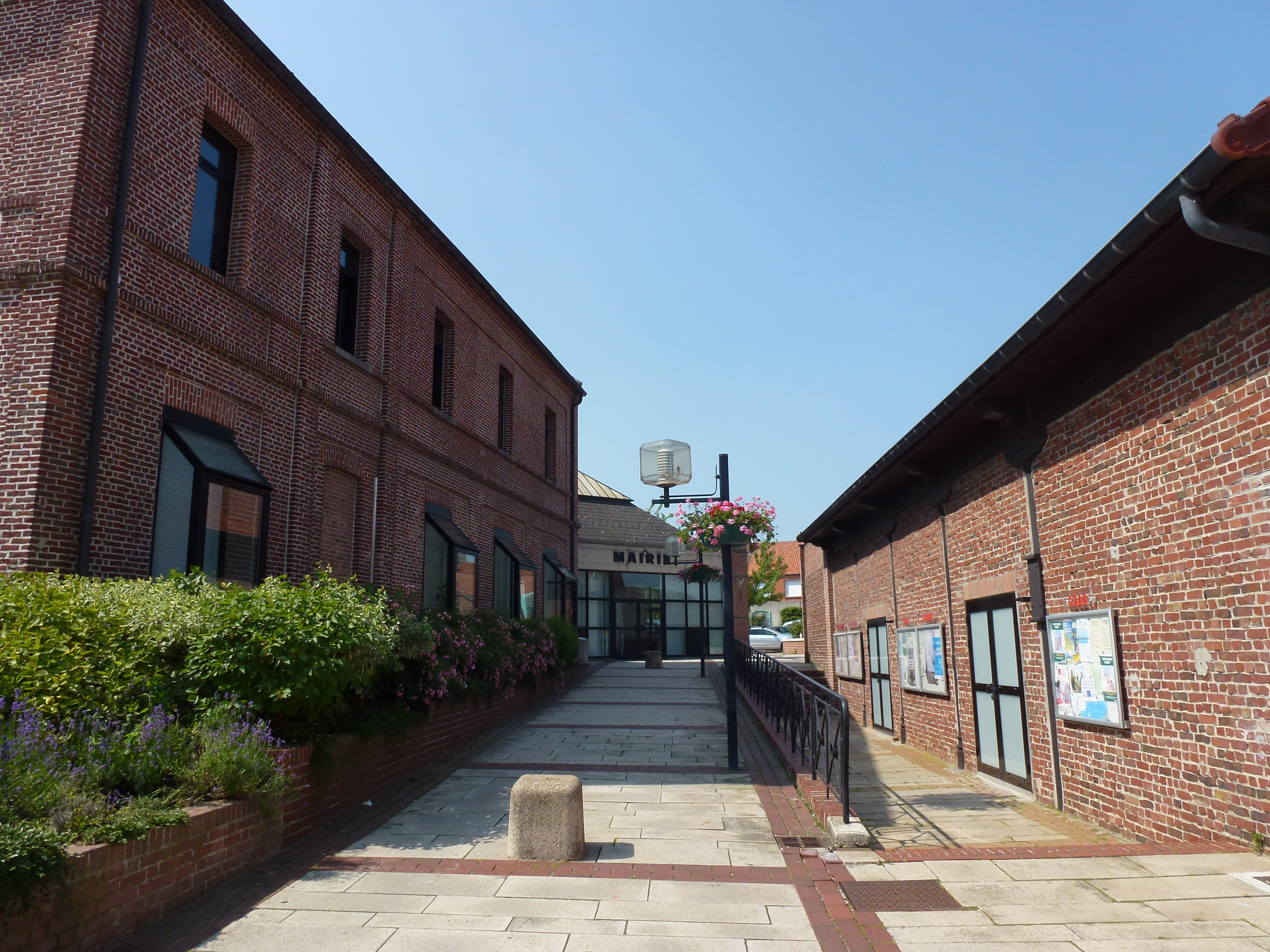
- The town hall in Raimbeaucourt

- Coat of arms
- Location of Raimbeaucourt
- Location within France Location within Hauts-de-France
- Coordinates: 50°26′25″N 3°06′12″E
- Country: France
- Region: Hauts-de-France
- Department: Nord
- Arrondissement: Douai
- Canton: Orchies
- Intercommunality: Douaisis Agglo

Government
  - Mayor (2020–2026): Alain Mension
- Area^{1}: 11.08 km^{2} (4.28 sq mi)
- Elevation: 40 m (130 ft)
- Highest elevation: 57 m (187 ft)
- Lowest elevation: 19 m (62 ft)
- Population (2023): 4,000
  - Density: 360/km^{2} (940/sq mi)
- Time zone: UTC+01:00 (CET)
  - Summer (DST): UTC+02:00 (CEST)
- INSEE/Postal code: 59489 /59283
- ^{1} French Land Register data, which excludes lakes, ponds, glaciers > 1 km^{2} (0.386 sq mi or 247 acres) and river estuaries.

Raimbeaucourt (French pronunciation: [ʁɛ̃bokuʁ]) is a commune in the Nord department of Hauts-de-France in northern France.

== Population ==
Historical population
| Year | Pop. | ±% p.a. |
|---|---|---|
| 1968 | 4,224 | — |
| 1975 | 4,410 | +0.62% |
| 1982 | 4,494 | +0.27% |
| 1990 | 4,277 | −0.62% |
| 1999 | 4,335 | +0.15% |
| 2007 | 4,272 | −0.18% |
| 2012 | 4,091 | −0.86% |
| 2017 | 4,002 | −0.44% |
| 2023 | 4,000 | −0.01% |
Source: INSEE

== Heraldry ==
| Arms of Raimbeaucourt | The arms of Raimbeaucourt are blazoned : Sable, a fleur de lys épanouie argent. |

== See also ==
- Communes of the Nord department
