= Escadrille Spa.88 =

French fighter squadron

- Active: 1917–1918
- Country: France
- Branch: French Air Service
- Type: Fighter Squadron
- Battle honours: Thrice Mentioned in dispatches Fourragere of the Croix de Guerre

Escadrille Spa.88 (also known as Escadrille N.88) was a French fighter squadron active for the final 20 months of the First World War. It spent 1918 as part of Groupe de Combat 13, being Mentioned in dispatches three times, granted the Fourragere of the Croix de Guerre, and credited with 32 enemy airplanes and four observation balloons destroyed.

== History ==
Escadrille Spa.88 was founded as Escadrille N.88 in late March 1917, as its original airplanes were Nieuport fighters. While formed in the French VII Armee, on 30 June 1917 it was transferred to VI Armee.

On 26 September 1917, the squadron was Mentioned in dispatches. four days later, it was refitted with SPAD S.7 and SPAD S.13 fighters and redesignated as Escadrille Spa.88. This was a prelude to being incorporated, along with three other squadrons, into Groupe de Combat 13 the next day, 1 October.

From 5 December 1917 to 15 January 1918, Escadrille Spa.88 was detached from the Groupe. After rejoining Groupe de Combat 13, the Groupe was one of those incorporated into Escadre de Combat No. 2 on 26 February. In turn, the Escadre was gathered into the Division Aerienne on 14 May 1918, as part of the French accretion of airpower. The Division Aerienne was tasked to the U.S. 1st Army for the Battle of Saint-Mihiel. On 10 September, as part of Groupe de Combat 13, the squadron was again Mentioned in dispatches.

By war's end, Escadrille Spa.88 was credited with destroying 32 German airplanes and four observation balloons. On 19 November 1918, eight days after the ceasefire, the squadron was once again Mentioned in dispatches. It was also granted the right for its members to wear the fourragere of the Croix de Guerre.

== Commanding officers ==
- Capitaine Francois d'Astier de la Vigerie: Late March 1917 - wounded in action 1 October 1917
- Capitaine Louis Sejourne: 1 October 1917 - 24 January 1918
- Capitaine Rene Doumer: 24 January 1918 - missing in action 28 June 1918
- Lieutenant Gabriel Thomas: 28 June 1918 - 7 July 1918
- Lieutenant Marcel Guerin: 7 July 1918 - accidental death 1 August 1918
- Lieutenant Gabriel Thomas: 1 August 1918 - wounded in action 2 September 1918
- Sous lieutenant Arthur Coadou: 2 September 1918 - 7 October 1918
- Lieutenant Paul Rozoy: 7 October 1918 - 11 November 1918 Armistice

== Notable members ==
- Lieutenant Gabriel Thomas
- Sous lieutenant Arthur Coadou
- Adjutant François Delzenne

== Aircraft ==
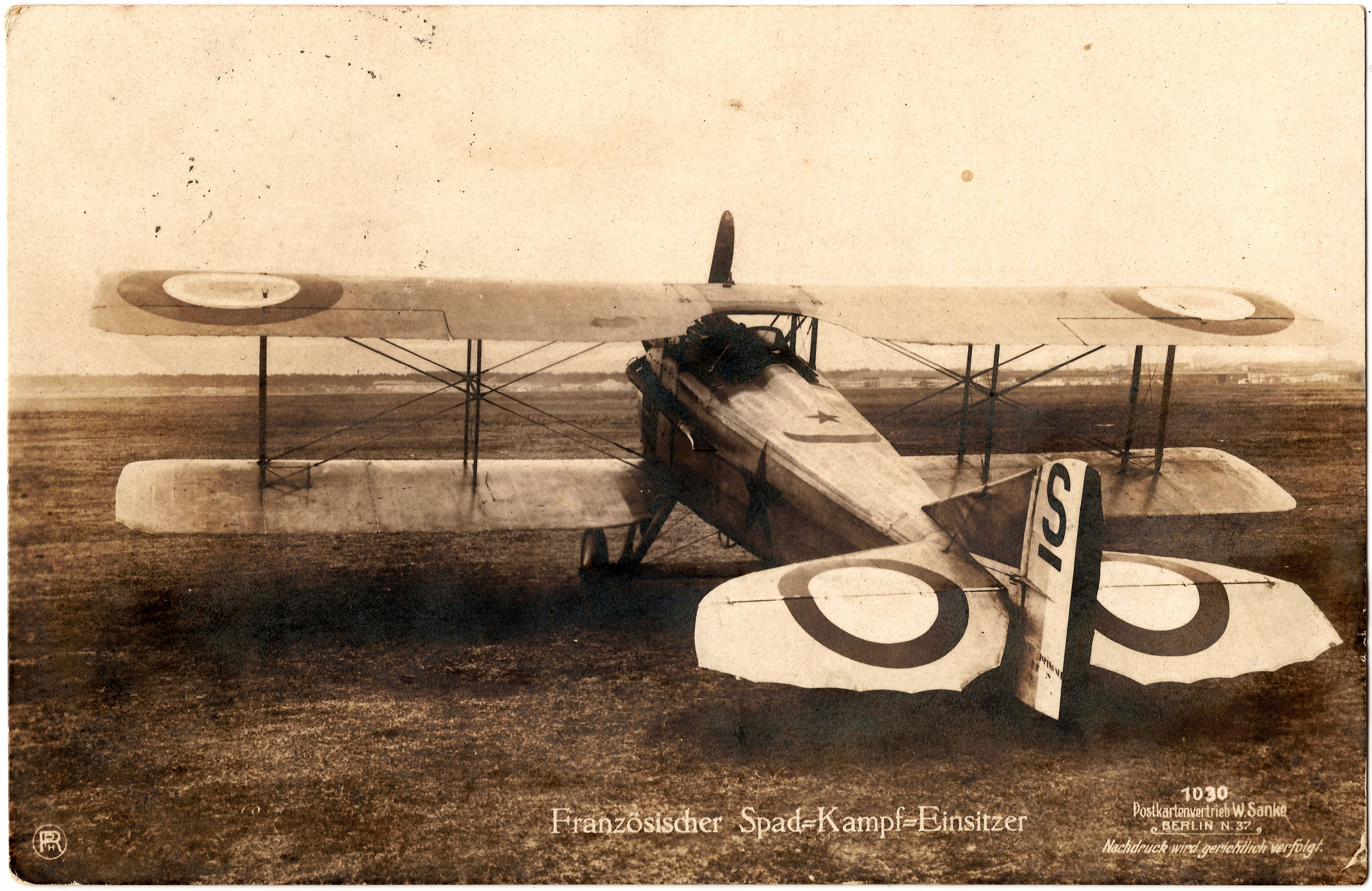
French SPAD S.7 fighter

- Nieuport fighters: Late March 1917 - 30 September 1917
- SPAD S.7 fighters: 30 September 1917 - war's end
- SPAD S.13 fighters: 30 September 1917 - war's end
