= Guy, Count of Flanders =

Count of Flanders from 1251 to 1305

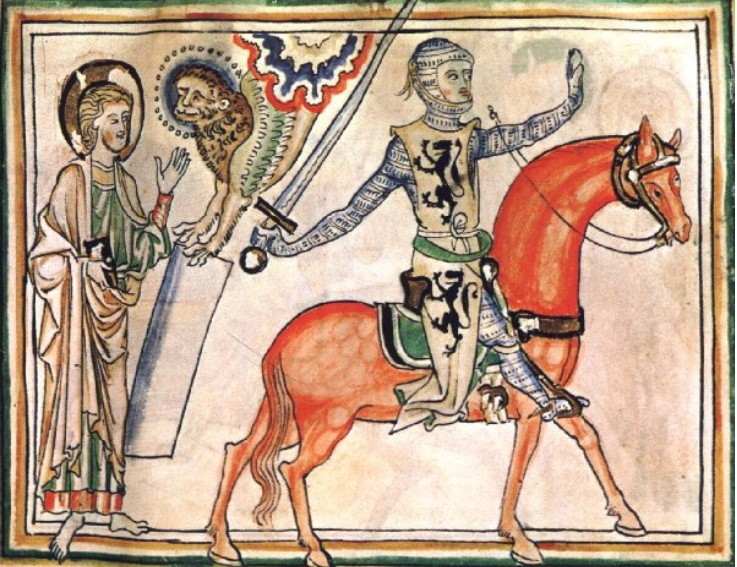
- Guy of Dampierre riding a horse. His surcoat bears the arms of the county of Flanders
- Born: c. 1226
- Died: 7 March 1305; Compiègne
- Noble family: House of Dampierre
- Spouses: Matilda of Béthune; Isabelle of Luxembourg
- Issue: Robert III, Count of Flanders; Beatrix; Margaret; Isabelle; Philippa; John I, Marquis of Namur; Guy of Namur; Henry; Jeanne
- Father: William II of Dampierre
- Mother: Margaret II of Flanders

Guy of Dampierre (French: Gui de Dampierre; Dutch: Gwijde van Dampierre) (c. 1226 – 7 March 1305, Compiègne) was the Count of Flanders (1251–1305) and Marquis of Namur (1264–1305). He was a prisoner of the French when his Flemings defeated the latter at the Battle of the Golden Spurs in 1302.

== Life ==
Guy was the second son of William II of Dampierre and Margaret II of Flanders. The death of his elder brother William in a tournament made him joint Count of Flanders with his mother. (She had made William co-ruler of Flanders in 1246 to ensure that it would go to the Dampierre children of her second marriage, rather than the Avesnes children of her first.) Guy and his mother struggled against the Avesnes (led by John I, Count of Hainaut) in the War of the Succession of Flanders and Hainault, but were defeated in 1253 at the Battle of Walcheren, and Guy was taken prisoner. By the mediation of Louis IX of France, he was ransomed in 1256. Some respite was obtained by the death of John of Hainaut in 1257.

In 1270, Margaret confiscated the wares of English merchants in Flanders for non-payment of customs. This led to a devastating trade war with England, which supplied most of the wool for the Flemish weavers. The dispute was ended by a treaty agreed at Montreuil-sur-Mer on 28 July 1274, effectively abolishing customs charged on English merchants in Flanders. Even after her abdication in 1278, Guy often found himself in difficulties with the fractious commoners.

In 1288, complaints over taxes led Philip IV of France to tighten his control over Flanders. Tension built between Guy and the king; in 1294, Guy arranged a marriage between his daughter Philippa and Edward, Prince of Wales. However, Philip imprisoned Guy and two of his sons, forced him to call off the marriage, and imprisoned Philippa in Paris until her death in 1306. Guy was summoned before the king again in 1296, and the principal cities of Flanders were taken under royal protection until Guy paid an indemnity and surrendered his territories, to hold them at the grace of the king.

After these indignities, Guy attempted to revenge himself on Philip by an alliance with Edward I of England in 1297, to which Philip responded by declaring Flanders annexed to the royal domain. The French under Robert II, count of Artois, defeated the Flemish at the 20 August 1297 Battle of Furnes, and Edward's expedition into Flanders was abortive. Both Philip and Edward had resorted to independently taxing the clergy and Pope Boniface VIII's initial response, the bull Clericis Laicos, had only led to the outlawing of most English clerics and a French embargo on the export of precious metals and jewels that damaged Boniface's own finances. Under close papal supervision, France and England accepted a 3-year status quo ante armistice in October 1297. In 1299, Edward ratified the Treaties of Montreuil and Chartres, betrothing his eldest son to Philip's daughter and himself marrying Philip's sister Margaret. Guy was thus left to his fate when the French invaded again after the end of the armistice in January 1300. He and his son Robert III were captured by May.

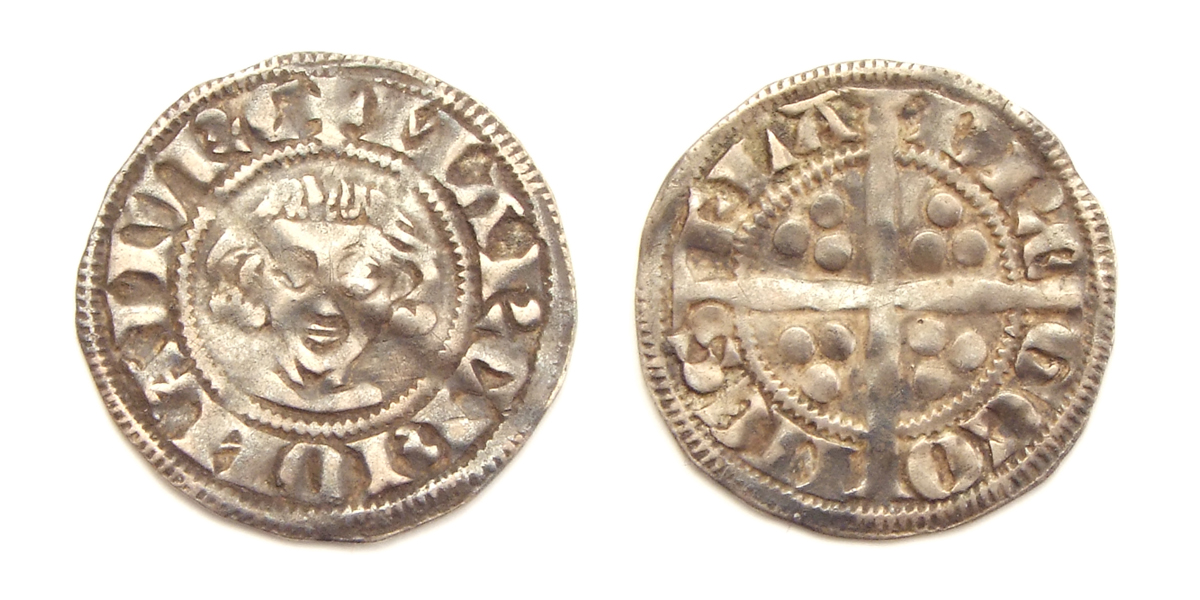
Sterling of Guy of Dampierre, struck Namur (circa 1295-1296).

The Flemish burghers, however, found direct French rule to be more oppressive than that of the count. After they smashed a French army at the Battle of the Golden Spurs in 1302, Guy was briefly released by the French who were negotiating terms to end the Siege of Tournai. His subjects, however, refused to compromise. A new French offensive in 1304 destroyed a Flemish fleet at the Battle of Zierikzee and defeated the Flemish at the Battle of Mons-en-Pévèle. Guy was returned to prison, where he died.

== Family ==
In June 1246 Guy married Matilda of Béthune (d. 8 November 1264), daughter of Robert VII, Lord of Bethune, and had the following children:

- Marie (d. 1297), married William of Jülich (d. 1278), son of William IV, Count of Jülich. She had at least two sons, William the elder and William the younger. Married in 1285 Simon II de Chateauvillain (d. 1305), Lord of Bremur.
- Robert III of Flanders (1249–1322), his successor.
- William (aft. 1249 – 1311), Lord of Dendermonde and Crèvecoeur, married in 1286 Alix of Beaumont, daughter of Raoul of Clermont and had issue. His son John of Dampierre, Lord of Crèvecœur married to Beatrice, daughter of Guy IV, Count of Saint-Pol.
- John of Flanders (1250 – 4 October 1290), Bishop of Metz and Bishop of Liège
- Baldwin (1252–1296).
- Margaret (c. 1253 – 3 July 1285), married in 1273 John I, Duke of Brabant
- Beatrice (c. 1260 – 5 April 1291), married c. 1270 Floris V, Count of Holland
- Philip (c. 1263 – November 1308), Count of Teano, married Mahaut de Courtenay, Countess of Chieti (d. 1303), married c. 1304 Philipotte of Milly (d. c. 1335), no issue.

In March 1265, Guy married Isabelle of Luxembourg (d. September 1298), daughter of Henry V of Luxembourg, and had the following children:

- Beatrice (d. 1307), married c. 1287 Hugh II of Châtillon
- Margaret (d. 1331), married on 14 November 1282 at Roxburgh, Alexander of Scotland (son of Alexander III of Scotland), married on 3 July 1286 in Namur, Reginald I of Guelders.
- Isabelle (d. 1323), married 1307 Jean de Fiennes, Lord of Tingry and Chatelain of Bourbourg, mother of Robert de Fiennes, Constable of France.
- Philippa (d. 1306, Paris).
- John I, Marquis of Namur (1267–1330), married Margaret of Clermont, daughter of Robert, Count of Clermont, and Marie of Artois (1291–1365)
- Guy of Namur (d. 1311), Lord of Ronse, Count of Zeeland, married Margaret of Lorraine, daughter of Theobald II, Duke of Lorraine. No issue.
- Henry (d. 6 November 1337), Count of Lodi, married January 1309 Margaret of Cleves (daughter of Dietrich VII, Count of Cleves) and had issue.
- Joan (d. 1296), a nun at Flines Abbey.

== Sources ==
- Bradbury, Jim (2007). The Capetians: The History of a Dynasty. Continuum Publishing.
- De Maesschalck, Edward (2019). De Graven van Vlaanderen (861-1384) [The Counts of Flanders (861-1384)] (in Dutch) (2nd ed.). DavidsFonds / Standaard uitgeverij. ISBN 9789002268458.
- Evergates, Theodore (2007). The Aristocracy in the County of Champagne, 1100–1300. University of Pennsylvania Press.
- Fegley, Randall (2002). The Golden Spurs of Kortrijk: How the Knights of France Fell to the Foot Soldiers of Flanders in 1302. McFarland & Co. ISBN 0786480548.
- Heirbaut, Dirk (2002). "Jan van Renesse en de andere Vlaamse aanvoerders in de Guldensporenslag" [John of Renesse and the other Flemish commanders of the battle of the Golden Spurs]. In Trio, Paul; Heirbaut, Dirk; van den Auweele, Dirk (eds.). Omtrent 1302 [About 1302] (in Dutch). Leuven: Universitaire Pers Leuven. ISBN 9058672085.
- Sargent-Baur, Barbara N. (1999). Philippe de Remi, Le Roman de la Manekine. Rodopi.
- Verbruggen, J. F. (2002). DeVries, Kelly (ed.). The Battle of the Golden Spurs (Courtrai, 11 July 1302). Translated by Ferguson, David Richard. Boydell Press.
- Walters, Barbara R.; Corrigan, Vincent; Ricketts, Peter T., eds. (2006). The Feast of Corpus Christi. The Pennsylvania State University Press.
- Wyffels, C. (1980). "Economische oorlog tussen Vlaanderen en Engeland". Doorheen de nationale geschiedenis. State Archives in Belgium.

Guy, Count of Flanders House of Dampierre Born: c. 1226 Died: 7 March 1305
Regnal titles
Preceded by Henry III	Marquis of Namur; 1268–1305	Succeeded by John I
Preceded by Margaret II	Count of Flanders; 1251–1305 with Margaret II (1251–1278)	Succeeded by Robert III
