= Feignies =

- Commune
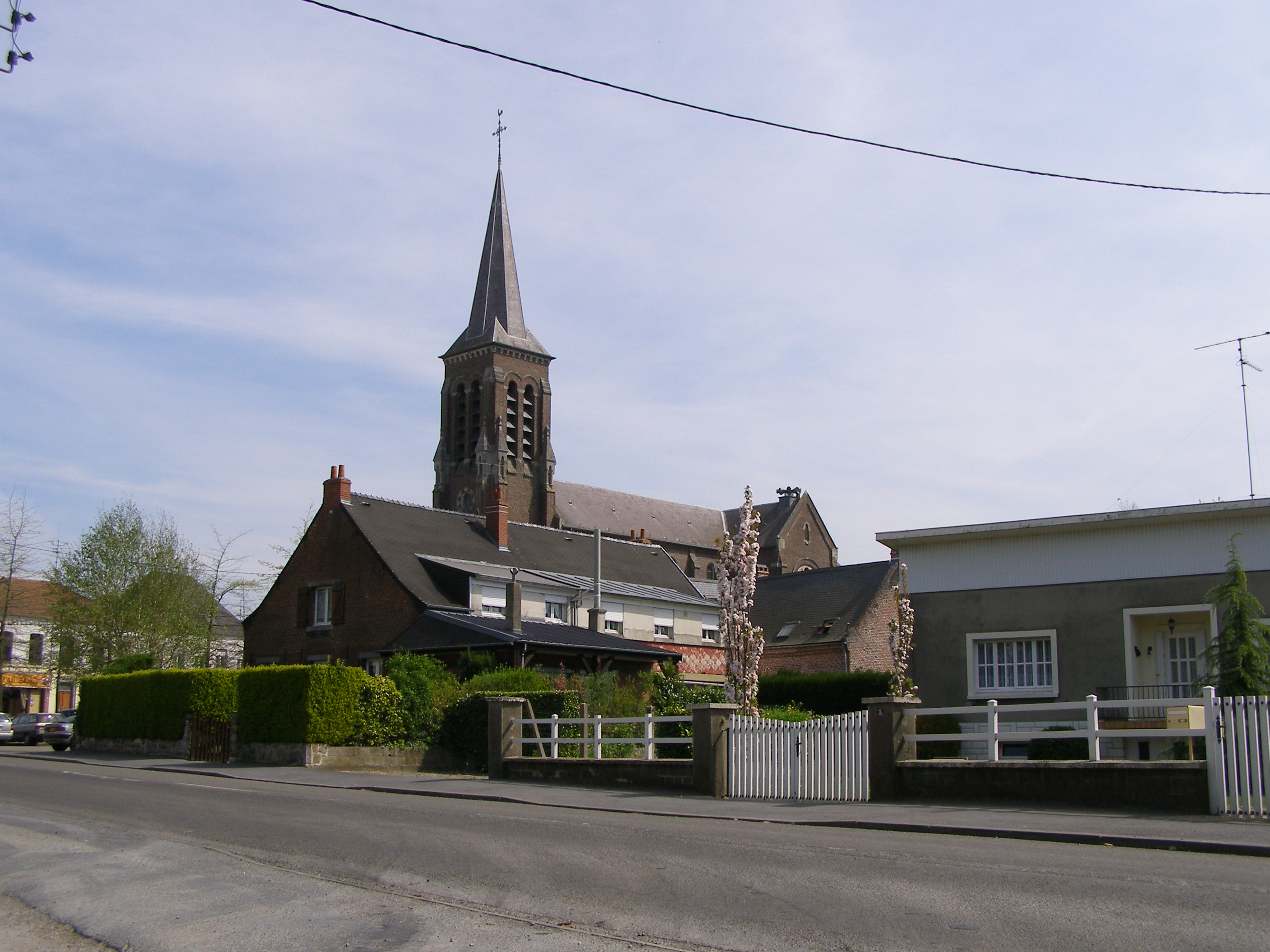
- The church in Feignies

- Coat of arms
- Location of Feignies
- Location within France Location within Hauts-de-France
- Coordinates: 50°18′11″N 3°55′08″E
- Country: France
- Region: Hauts-de-France
- Department: Nord
- Arrondissement: Avesnes-sur-Helpe
- Canton: Aulnoye-Aymeries
- Intercommunality: Maubeuge Val de Sambre

Government
  - Mayor (2020–2026): Patrick Leduc
- Area^{1}: 18.8 km^{2} (7.3 sq mi)
- Elevation: 150 m (490 ft)
- Highest elevation: 161 m (528 ft)
- Lowest elevation: 130 m (430 ft)
- Population (2023): 6,703
  - Density: 357/km^{2} (923/sq mi)
- Time zone: UTC+01:00 (CET)
  - Summer (DST): UTC+02:00 (CEST)
- INSEE/Postal code: 59225 /59750
- Website: ville-feignies.fr
- ^{1} French Land Register data, which excludes lakes, ponds, glaciers > 1 km^{2} (0.386 sq mi or 247 acres) and river estuaries.

Feignies (French pronunciation: [fɛɲi]) is a commune in the Nord department in northern France.

Feignies is twinned with the English village of Keyworth.

== Population ==
Historical population
Year	Pop.	±% p.a.
1968	6,666	—
1975	7,147	+1.00%
1982	6,910	−0.48%
1990	7,269	+0.64%
1999	7,183	−0.13%
2007	7,221	+0.07%
2012	7,156	−0.18%
2017	6,881	−0.78%
2023	6,703	−0.44%
Source: INSEE

== Sport ==
The commune has a football team Entente Feignies Aulnoye FC, who play at Complexe Sportif Didier Eloy.

== Heraldry ==
Arms of Feignies	The arms of Feignies are blazoned : Or, a lion sable armed and langued gules. ('Flanders' and the communes of Thourotte, Crépy-en-Valois, Bollezeele, Feignies, Flines-lez-Raches and Wormhout use the same arms.)

== See also ==
- Communes of the Nord department
- Fort de Leveau
