= Jeanne Devos (photographer) =

French photographer

- Born: February 10, 1902
- Died: June 18, 1989 (aged 87)
- Citizenship: French
- Occupation: Photographer

Jeanne Devos (February 10, 1902 – June 18, 1989) was a French photographer born in Bailleul, Nord.

== Biography ==
=== Youth ===
Jeanne Devos was born in Bailleul, Nord, on February 10, 1902. She grew up there, where her father was an agricultural broker. In 1918, she contracted tuberculosis as a result of the war and the insalubrity in Bailleul. On the advice of a doctor, her father decided to move her to the countryside. In 1922, she convalesced in Bissezeele with a friend of her father's, Abbé Joseph Lamps. In 1923, as Devos' health deteriorated, Abbé Joseph Lamps transported her to Corsica, where he initiated her into the world of photography, specifically focusing on autochromes and stereoscopy. Subsequently, he employed her as a housekeeper at the parish, disregarding ecclesiastical norms and the counsel of church authorities.

=== Photographic work ===
From the 1930s onwards, she began to travel. She went to the Colonial Exhibition in Paris in 1931, then to Biarritz, Lourdes, Sologne and Périgord. Beginning in 1936, she extensively explored Flanders, capturing a rich array of photographs that documented the region's rural and traditional lifestyles, occupations, cultural beliefs, and festive celebrations. On September 7, 1944, Abbé Lamps and Devos were in Bissezeele during the village's liberation, where they recorded over 150 photographs of the 5th Canadian Infantry Brigade as it moved through the area.

In 1945, Abbé Lamps retired and relocated from Bissezeele to Wormhout. Devos chose to pursue her passion for photography as a profession, specializing in identity photographs, portraits, images of communicants, conscripts, christenings, industrial documentation, and notably, wedding photography. This initiative was innovative, as she became the first to provide a comprehensive photographic account of the wedding day, including ceremonies held in the church, an approach that was met with disapproval from religious authorities at that time.

Devos was the first female professional photographer in the Nord.

Devos retired in 1978.

=== Notable people photographed ===
In 1946 and 1959 Devos captured images of General de Gaulle during his visits to the towns of Bergues and Wormhout. Additionally, she photographed Paul Reynaud on several occasions, most notably in a wheat field, which was an unconventional setting for a figure of such political significance.

=== Death ===
Devos died on June 18, 1989. She is buried in her garden alongside Abbé Joseph Lamps.

== Posterity ==
A museum in Wormhout bears her name, housed in the former presbytery where she lived. She had sold her house as a life annuity to the commune of Wormhout, after ensuring that it would become a museum.

At the end of her life, Devos donated her photographs to the Comité flamand de France. The Comité flamand de France decided to deposit the photographic collection of over 100,000 photos of Jeanne Devos and Abbé Lamps at the Centre Iconographique de la Flandre, based at the Wormhout media library, for conservation and promotion.

On June 10, 2022, a documentary on her life entitled "Les images de Mademoiselle Devos", directed by Anne Bruneau, was shown at the Studio National des Arts Contemporains in Tourcoing.

Two books have been written about her :

- Chazaud, Pierre, Jeanne Devos. Photographe de la Flandre rurale et religieuse, Valence, Mandala Toulaud, 2016, 160 pages.
- Vanmerris, Corinne, Dans l'objectif de Mademoiselle Jeanne Devos, dessins de Léo Nezot, Marais du Livre, 2014.
