= Wormhoudt Communal Cemetery =

Wormhout cemetery
- Cimetière de Wormhout
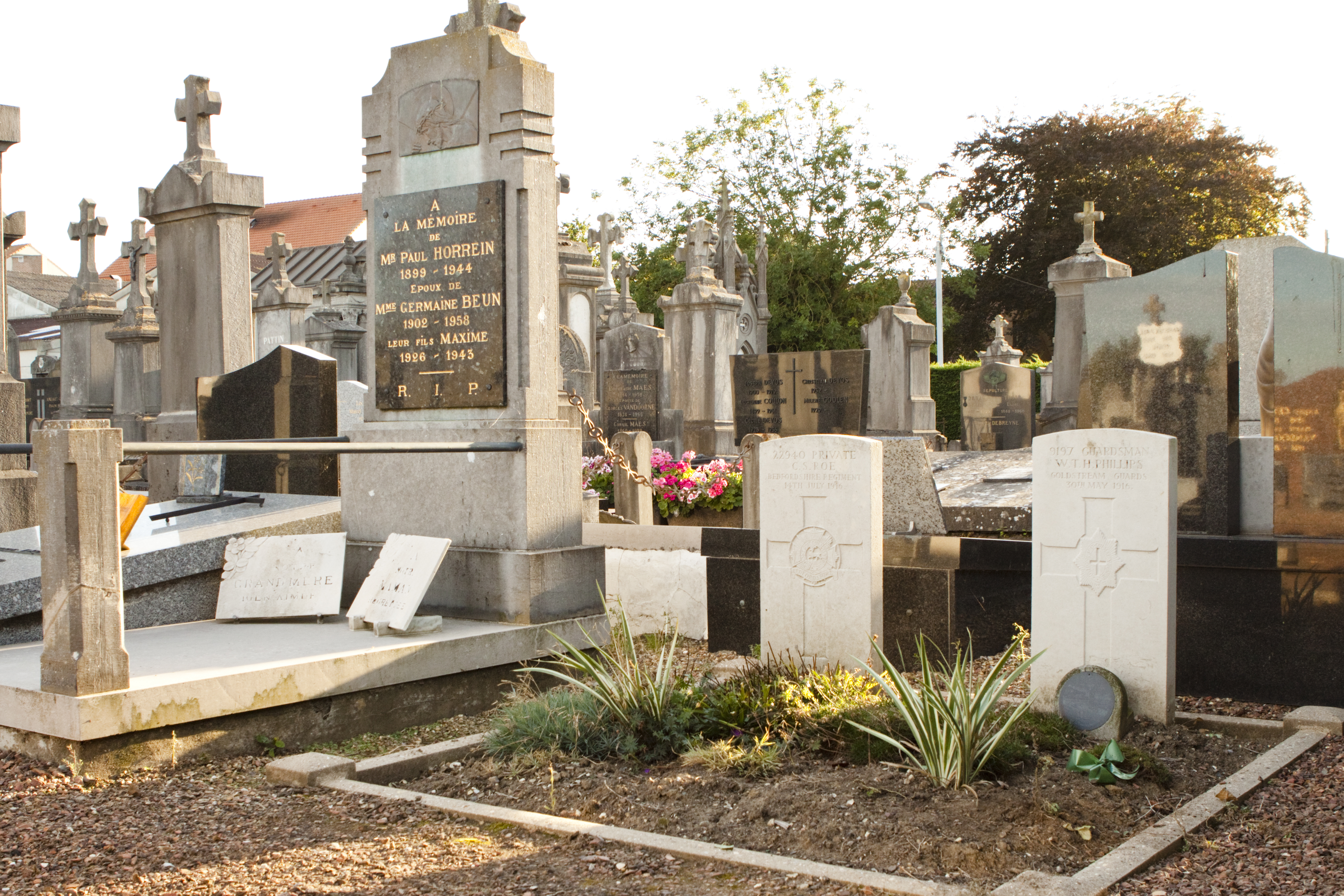
- French civilian graves and two World War I British war graves
- Interactive map of Wormhout cemetery

Details
- Location: Wormhout, Nord
- Country: France
- Coordinates: 50°53′22″N 02°27′58″E
- Find a Grave: Wormhout cemetery

Wormhout cemetery (French: Cimetière de Wormhout; Dutch: Begraafplaats van Wormhout) is a communal cemetery of Wormhout in the French department Nord. The site is located 700 metres north of the centre (municipal hall) at the Cours N4 du Cimetière.

== British war graves ==
Wormhoudt Communal Cemetery
- Commonwealth War Graves Commission
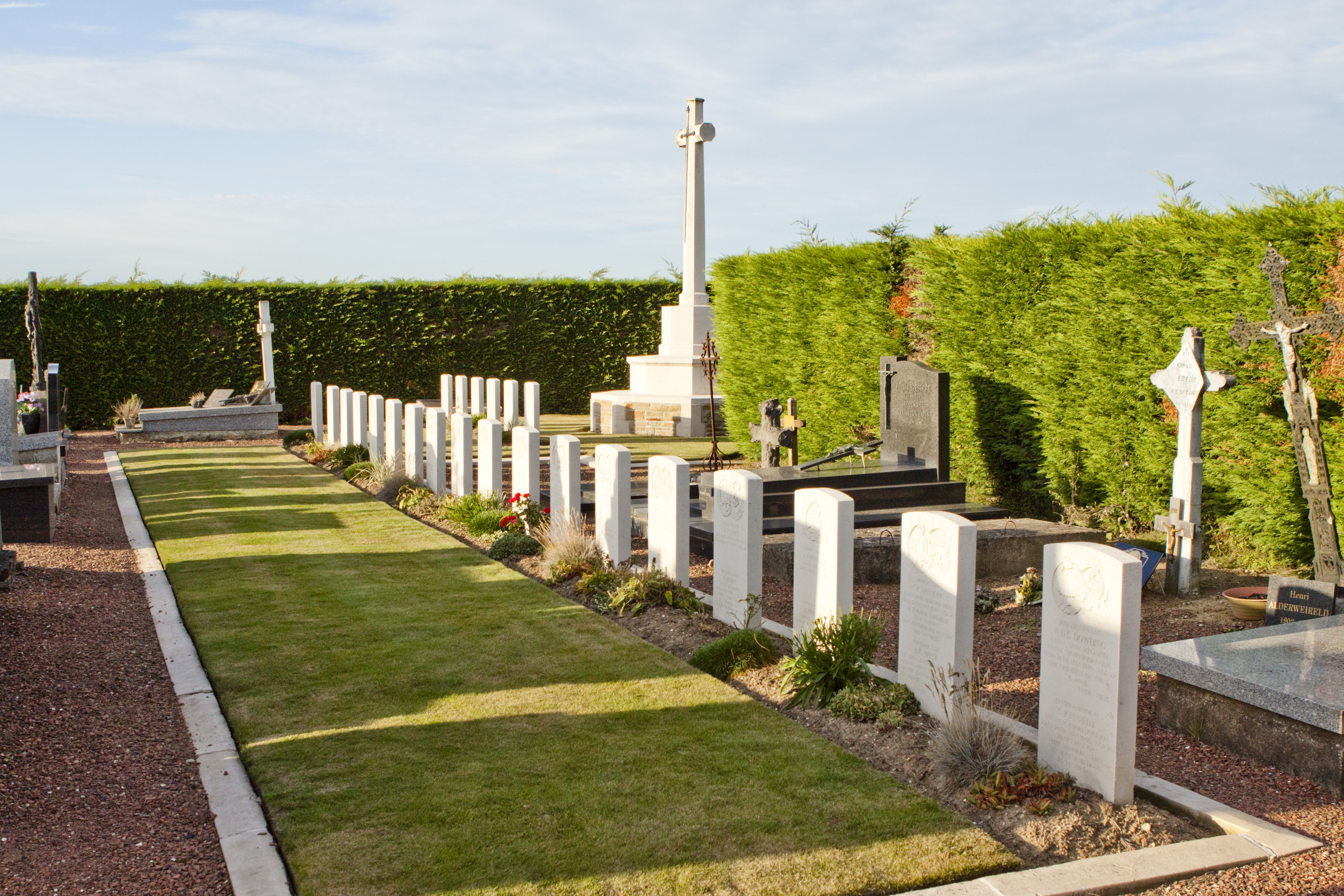
- Cross of Sacrifice and graves of the Second World War
- Used for those deceased
- Location: Wormhout

Burials by nation
- United Kingdom

Burials by war
- First World War and Second World War

A Commonwealth military burial site is located in the northeastern corner of the cemetery and includes 113 identified and 31 non-identified victims of the Second World War. These victims mainly died in May 1940 during the withdrawal of the British Expeditionary Force to Dunkirk. Moreover, the site includes the Cross of Sacrifice.

Four British casualties of the First World War are buried between civilians' graves.

The graves are administered by the Commonwealth War Graves Commission and are registered under Wormhoudt Communal Cemetery.

=== Graves ===
- Cyril Hugh Joseph Chichester-Constable and James Edward Weeks Rance, both majors at the Royal Warwickshire Regiment and Mervyn Ashley Edwards, second lieutenant at the Royal Artillery, all decorated with the Military Cross (MC).
- John Crichton, 5th Earl Erne of the Royal Horse Guards (attd. 12th Royal Lancers, Royal Armoured Corps) and North Irish Horse who was killed in action on 23 May 1940.
- W. T. H. Phillips, soldier at the 1st Battalion Coldstream Guards, executed for desertion.
