= Bollezeele =

- Commune
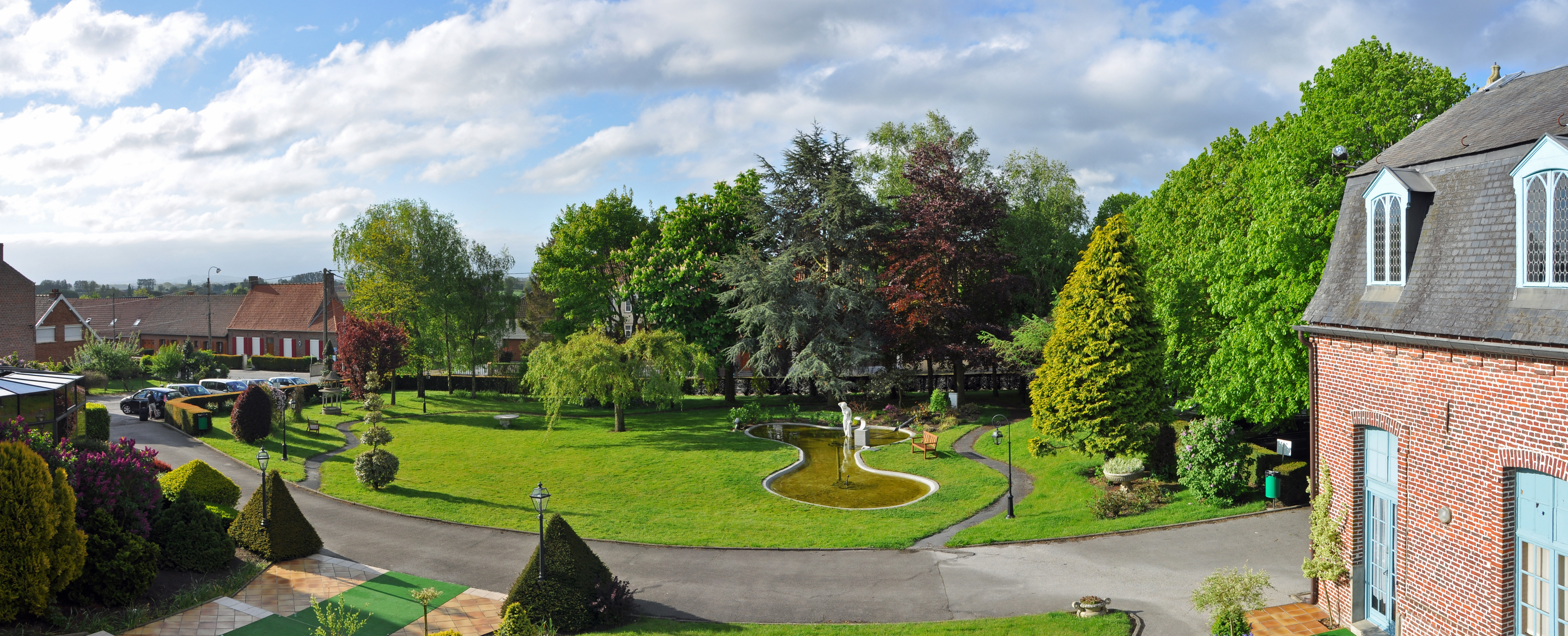
- A view within Bollezeele

- Coat of arms
- Location of Bollezeele
- Location within France Location within Hauts-de-France
- Coordinates: 50°51′55″N 2°19′29″E
- Country: France
- Region: Hauts-de-France
- Department: Nord
- Arrondissement: Dunkirk
- Canton: Wormhout
- Intercommunality: Hauts de Flandre

Government
  - Mayor (2020–2026): Pierre Marle
- Area^{1}: 17.54 km^{2} (6.77 sq mi)
- Elevation: 44 m (144 ft)
- Highest elevation: 52 m (171 ft)
- Lowest elevation: 2 m (6.6 ft)
- Population (2023): 1,445
  - Density: 82.38/km^{2} (213.4/sq mi)
- Time zone: UTC+01:00 (CET)
  - Summer (DST): UTC+02:00 (CEST)
- INSEE/Postal code: 59089 /59470
- ^{1} French Land Register data, which excludes lakes, ponds, glaciers > 1 km^{2} (0.386 sq mi or 247 acres) and river estuaries.

Bollezeele (French pronunciation: [bɔlzɛl]; from Dutch; Bollezele in the modern Dutch spelling) is a commune in the Nord department in northern France.

It is 17 km (11 mi) south of Dunkirk and also 20 km (12 mi) west of the Belgian border. The river Yser runs through Bollezeele.

== Language ==
Bollezeele's local speech is traditionally a Flemish dialect, similar to that spoken on the other side of the border with Belgium; this led to the town's being included in the Atlas Linguarum Europae as one of the Germanic dialects in France (the others were all in either Alsace or Moselle).

== Population ==
Historical population
Year	Pop.	±% p.a.
1968	1,389	—
1975	1,328	−0.64%
1982	1,500	+1.76%
1990	1,476	−0.20%
1999	1,382	−0.73%
2007	1,384	+0.02%
2012	1,425	+0.59%
2017	1,435	+0.14%
2023	1,445	+0.12%
Source: INSEE

== Heraldry ==
Arms of Bollezeele	The arms of Bollezeele are blazoned : Or, a lion sable armed and langued gules. ('Flanders' and the communes of Thourotte, Crépy-en-Valois, Bollezeele, Feignies, Flines-lez-Raches and Wormhout use the same arms.)

== See also ==
- Communes of the Nord department
