= Canton of Orchies =

Coordinates: 50.47°N 3.24°E

The canton of Orchies is an administrative division of the Nord department, northern France. Its borders were modified at the French canton reorganisation which came into effect in March 2015. Its seat is in Orchies.

It consists of the following communes:

1. Aix-en-Pévèle
2. Anhiers
3. Auby
4. Auchy-lez-Orchies
5. Beuvry-la-Forêt
6. Bouvignies
7. Coutiches
8. Faumont
9. Flines-lez-Raches
10. Landas
11. Nomain
12. Orchies
13. Râches
14. Raimbeaucourt
15. Roost-Warendin
16. Saméon
