= Wormhoudt massacre =

War crime by the Waffen-SS

Coordinates: 50°52′47″N 2°26′37″E

- Part of Battle of Dunkirk (Battle of France)
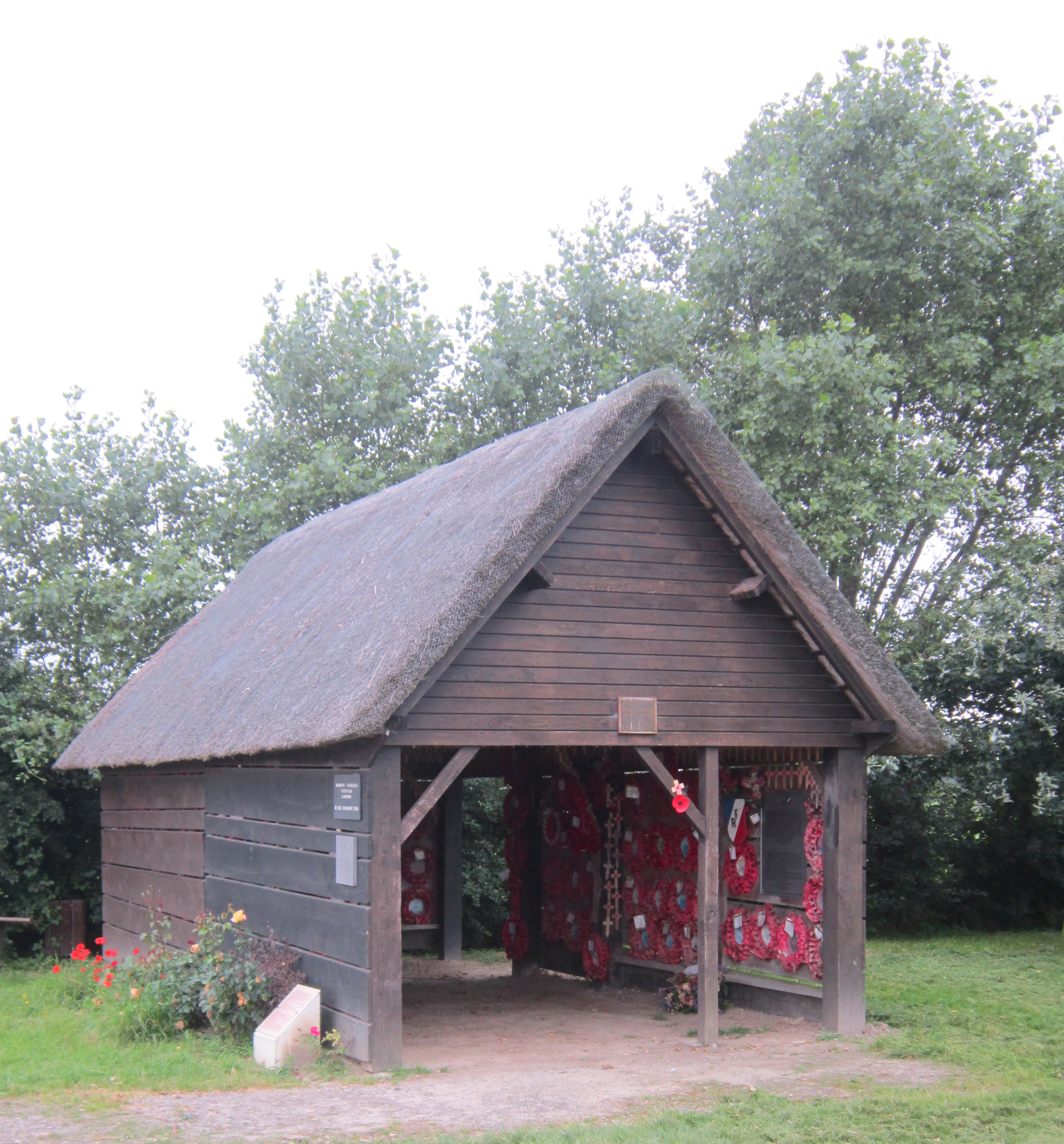
- Rebuilt barn (cowshed), Wormhoudt massacre site
- Location: Wormhout, France
- Date: 28 May 1940
- Target: British and French POWs
- Attack type: War crime
- Weapons: Model 24 grenades Automatic weapons Rifles
- Deaths: 81
- Injuries: 6
- Perpetrator: Leibstandarte SS Adolf Hitler division

The Wormhoudt massacre (or Wormhout massacre) was the mass murder of 81 British and French POWs by Waffen-SS soldiers from the 1st SS Division Leibstandarte SS Adolf Hitler during the Battle of France in May 1940.

== Fighting ==
As part of the British Expeditionary Force's (BEF) retreat to Dunkirk, the 144th Infantry Brigade of the 48th (South Midland) Infantry Division was holding the road that runs southward from Bergues through Wormhoudt, Cassel and Hazebrouck to delay the German advance.

British troops at Wormhoudt were overrun by advancing German forces. Having exhausted their ammunition supplies, the soldiers surrendered to the SS troops assuming that they would be taken prisoner according to the Geneva Conventions.

== Massacre ==
After their surrender, a large group of soldiers from the 2nd Battalion, Royal Warwickshire Regiment, 4th Battalion Cheshire Regiment, and gunners of the 210 Battery, 53rd (The Worcestershire Yeomanry) Anti-Tank Regiment, Royal Artillery as well as French soldiers in charge of a military depot were taken to a barn in La Plaine au Bois near Wormhout and Esquelbecq on 28 May 1940. The Allied troops had become increasingly alarmed at the brutal conduct of the SS soldiers en route to the barn, which included the shooting of a number of wounded stragglers. On arrival at the barn the most senior British officer in the group, Captain James Lynn-Allen, protested, but was immediately rebuked by an SS soldier.

When there were nearly 100 men inside the small barn, soldiers from the Leibstandarte SS Adolf Hitler, threw stick-grenades into the building, killing many POWs, including Charles Orton, a captain in the Royal Warwickshire Regiment. The grenades failed to kill everyone, largely due to the actions of two British NCOs, Sergeant Stanley Moore and CSM Augustus Jennings, who hurled themselves on top of the grenades using their bodies to suppress the force of the explosion and shield their comrades from the blast. Upon realising this, the SS called for two groups of five to come out. The first five included Pte Arthur Johnson and Private Bennett. The men came out and were shot. Despite being shot, Private Johnson and Gunner Brian Fahey survived, unknown to the SS men at the time. Concluding that these methods were too slow, the SS troopers simply fired into the barn with their weapons.

Several British prisoners were able to escape, while a few others, like Fahey, were left for dead. Captain Lynn-Allen died while trying to escape, although he enabled Private Bert Evans to escape; Evans was the last survivor of the massacre. A total of 80 men were killed. While 15 more were wounded, their wounds were so severe that within 48 hours all but six of them had died. After a couple of days, Johnson and Fahey and several others were found by regular German Army medics and taken to hospital. Their wounds were treated before they were sent to prisoner of war camps in occupied Europe.

== Legacy ==
The Waffen-SS division, Leibstandarte SS Adolf Hitler was under the overall command of Oberstgruppenführer Sepp Dietrich. It was alleged from post-war testimony that it was specifically soldiers of the 2nd Battalion under the command of then Hauptsturmführer Wilhelm Mohnke who carried out the atrocity. However, Mohnke never had to face a trial for any alleged part in the war crimes based on these hors de combat killings. Mohnke strongly denied the accusations against him, telling historian Thomas Fischer, "I issued no orders not to take English prisoners or to execute prisoners." Mohnke died in August 2001.

In 1947, a number of survivors of the massacre returned to the scene accompanied by officials from the War Crimes Interrogation Unit, following investigations undertaken by the office of the Judge Advocate General. It proved impossible to construct a sufficiently strong case to bring prosecutions. A number of alleged key witnesses were reported to have died on the Eastern Front, while others invoked the "SS oath" and refused to talk.

In 1988, after a campaign by British MP Jeff Rooker, the case was reopened but a German prosecutor came to the conclusion that there was insufficient evidence to bring charges. The 2004 German film Downfall was criticized by author Giles MacDonogh upon release for its sympathetic portrayal of Mohnke, whom many hold directly or indirectly responsible for the massacre.

== See also ==
- List of massacres in France
- Le Paradis massacre
- List of war crimes
