= Saméon =

- Commune
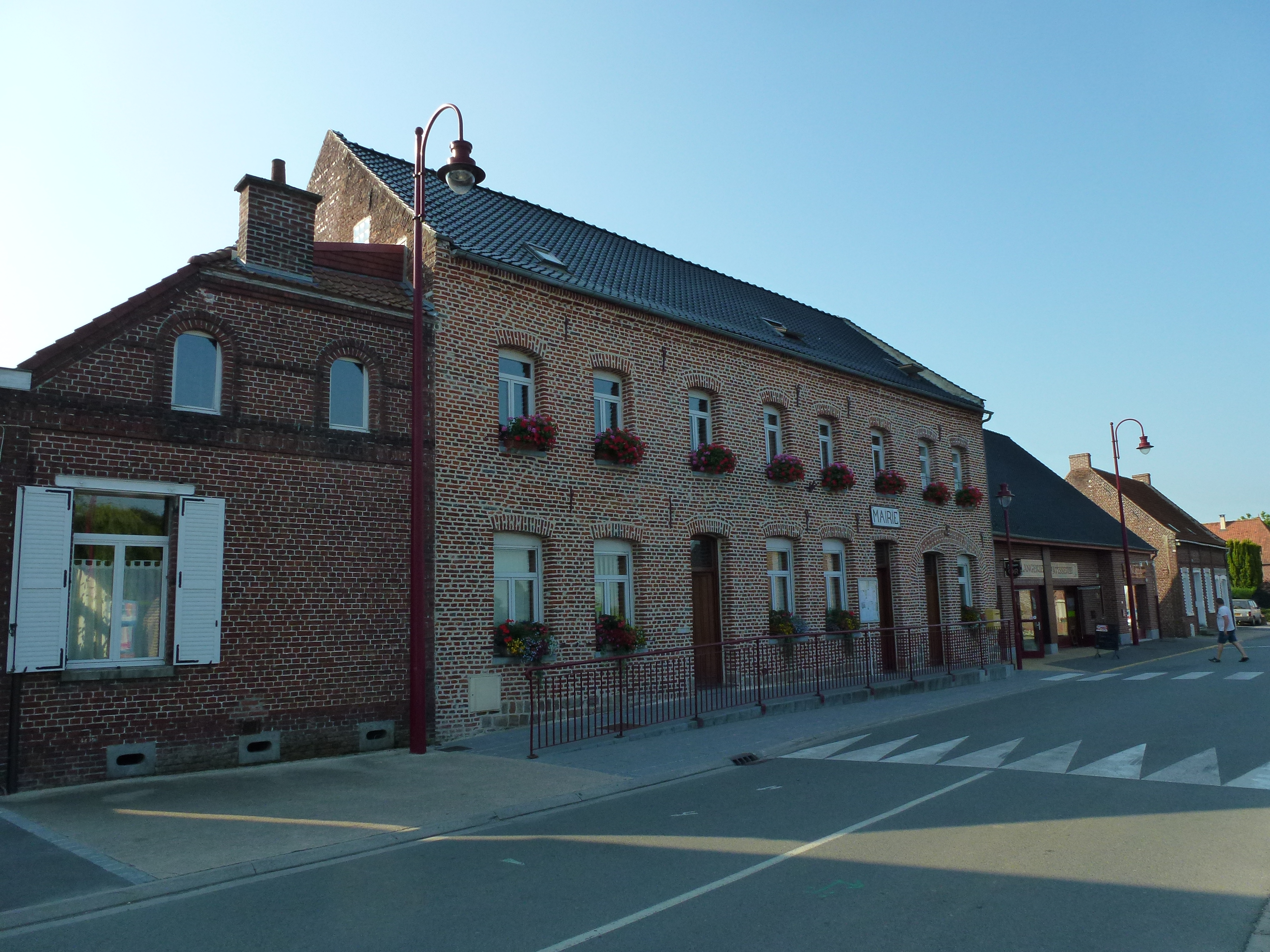
- The town hall in Saméon

- Coat of arms
- Location of Saméon
- Location within France Location within Hauts-de-France
- Coordinates: 50°28′41″N 3°20′06″E
- Country: France
- Region: Hauts-de-France
- Department: Nord
- Arrondissement: Douai
- Canton: Orchies
- Intercommunality: Pévèle-Carembault

Government
  - Mayor (2024–2026): José Duhamel
- Area^{1}: 8.82 km^{2} (3.41 sq mi)
- Elevation: 25 m (82 ft)
- Highest elevation: 36 m (118 ft)
- Lowest elevation: 18 m (59 ft)
- Population (2023): 1,704
  - Density: 193/km^{2} (500/sq mi)
- Time zone: UTC+01:00 (CET)
  - Summer (DST): UTC+02:00 (CEST)
- INSEE/Postal code: 59551 /59310
- ^{1} French Land Register data, which excludes lakes, ponds, glaciers > 1 km^{2} (0.386 sq mi or 247 acres) and river estuaries.

Saméon (French pronunciation: [sameɔ̃]) is a commune in the Nord department in northern France.

== Heraldry ==
| Arms of Saméon | The arms of Saméon are blazoned : Per pale highly indented Or and azure. |

== Twinning ==
Saméon is twinned with Sherington, England.

== See also ==
- Communes of the Nord department
