= François Delzenne =

François Paul Delzenne
- Born: March 16, 1887; Coutiches, France
- Died: April 24, 1962 (aged 75)
- Burial place: Râches
- Military career
- Allegiance: France
- Branch: Artillery; aviation
- Service years: 1908 - 1921
- Rank: Adjudant-Chef
- Unit: Escadrille Spa.88
- Awards: Legion d'honneur Médaille militaire Croix de Guerre

Chief adjutant François Paul Delzenne was a World War I flying ace credited with seven aerial victories.

== Biography ==
François Paul Delzenne was born in Coutiches, France on 16 March 1887. He entered military service on 1 October 1908. He rose through the enlisted ranks as he was assigned and reassigned in various artillery regiments until the beginning of hostilities for World War I. He began his war as a cannoneer.

On 8 December 1915, he was sent to pilot's training. He received his Military Pilot's Brevet in April 1916. On 1 July, he was promoted to Adjutant.

His record was blank until 1 January 1918, when he was promoted to Adjutant chef. In February 1918, he received advanced pilot training for fighters. He was then posted to Escadrille 88 on 13 May 1918. On 27 June, he shot down a German observation balloon. Between 23 August and 29 October 1918, he shot down six enemy airplanes. He ended the war having garnered the Médaille Militaire and the Croix de Guerre.

He remained in service postwar, being commissioned a Sous lieutenant on 16 February 1919. On 6 July 1919, he was granted entry into the Legion d'honneur.
