= Auby =

- Commune
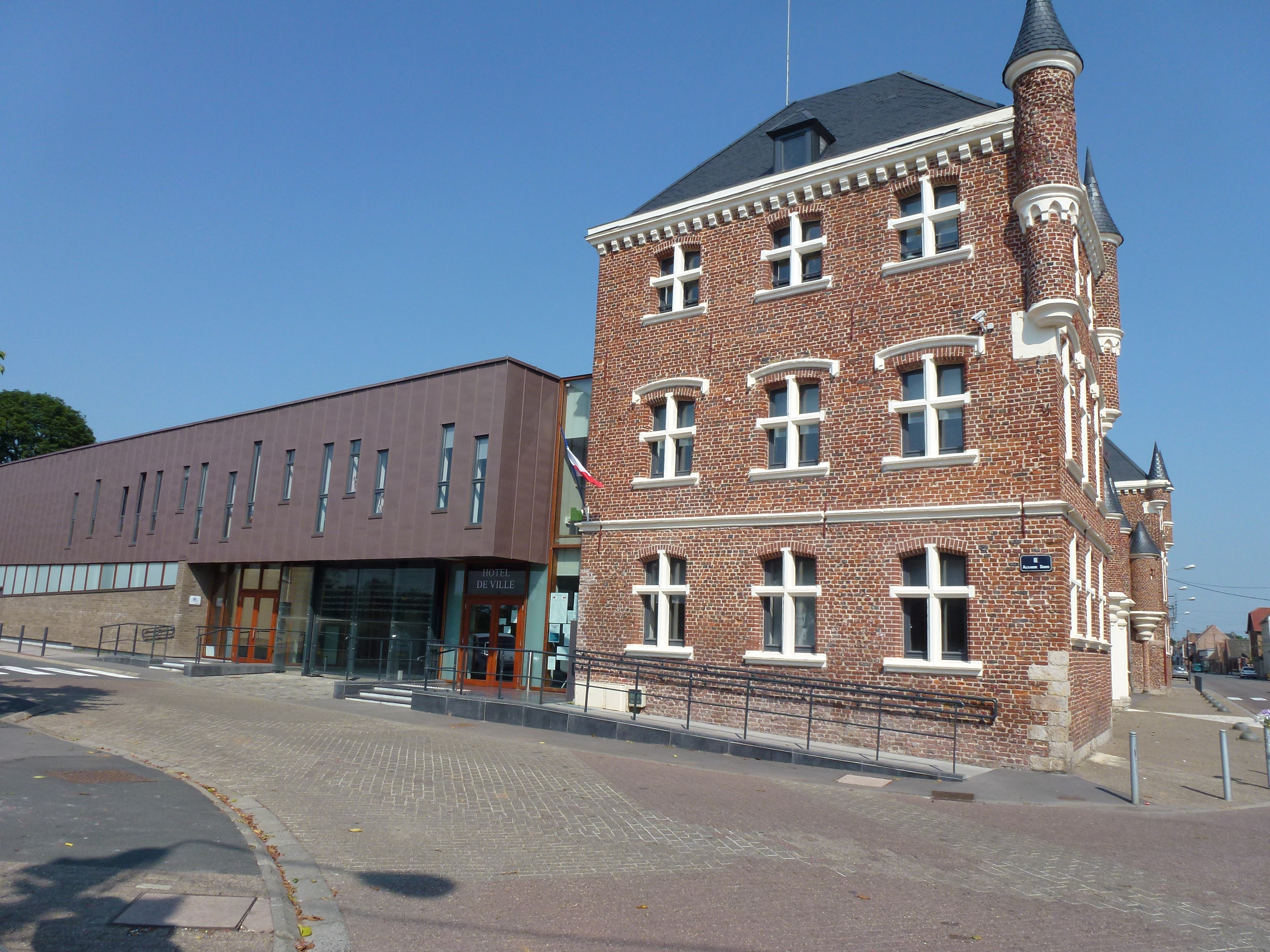
- The town hall in Auby

- Coat of arms
- Location of Auby
- Location within France Location within Hauts-de-France
- Coordinates: 50°24′57″N 3°03′18″E
- Country: France
- Region: Hauts-de-France
- Department: Nord
- Arrondissement: Douai
- Canton: Orchies
- Intercommunality: Douaisis Agglo

Government
  - Mayor (2020–2026): Christophe Charles
- Area^{1}: 7.12 km^{2} (2.75 sq mi)
- Elevation: 22 m (72 ft)
- Highest elevation: 32 m (105 ft)
- Lowest elevation: 18 m (59 ft)
- Population (2023): 7,083
  - Density: 995/km^{2} (2,580/sq mi)
- Time zone: UTC+01:00 (CET)
  - Summer (DST): UTC+02:00 (CEST)
- INSEE/Postal code: 59028 /59950
- ^{1} French Land Register data, which excludes lakes, ponds, glaciers > 1 km^{2} (0.386 sq mi or 247 acres) and river estuaries.

Auby is a commune in the Nord department in northern France. It is 5 km (3.1 mi) north of the centre of Douai.

It is a centre of zinc production and home to a plant owned by Nyrstar.

== Population ==
Historical population

Year	Pop.	±% p.a.
1793	709	—
1800	762	+1.04%
1806	886	+2.54%
1821	887	+0.01%
1831	968	+0.88%
1836	953	−0.31%
1841	980	+0.56%
1846	1,020	+0.80%
1851	1,092	+1.37%
1856	1,092	+0.00%
1861	1,177	+1.51%
1866	1,253	+1.26%
1872	1,385	+1.68%
1876	2,049	+10.29%
1881	2,410	+3.30%
1886	2,277	−1.13%
1891	2,364	+0.75%
1896	2,685	+2.58%
1901	3,048	+2.57%

Year	Pop.	±% p.a.
1906	3,445	+2.48%
1911	4,462	+5.31%
1921	4,745	+0.62%
1926	6,930	+7.87%
1931	7,506	+1.61%
1936	7,165	−0.93%
1946	7,227	+0.09%
1954	8,579	+2.17%
1962	9,007	+0.61%
1968	9,090	+0.15%
1975	8,954	−0.22%
1982	8,630	−0.53%
1990	8,442	−0.27%
1999	7,958	−0.65%
2007	7,708	−0.40%
2012	7,417	−0.77%
2017	7,274	−0.39%
2023	7,083	−0.44%

Source: EHESS and INSEE (1968-2023)

== Heraldry ==
Arms of Auby	The arms of Auby are blazoned : Quarterly 1&4: Argent, an eagle sable, beaked and membered gules; 2&3: quarterly Or and sable.

== International relations ==
Auby is twinned with Czeladź in Poland.

== See also ==
- Communes of the Nord department
