= Auchy-lez-Orchies =

- Commune
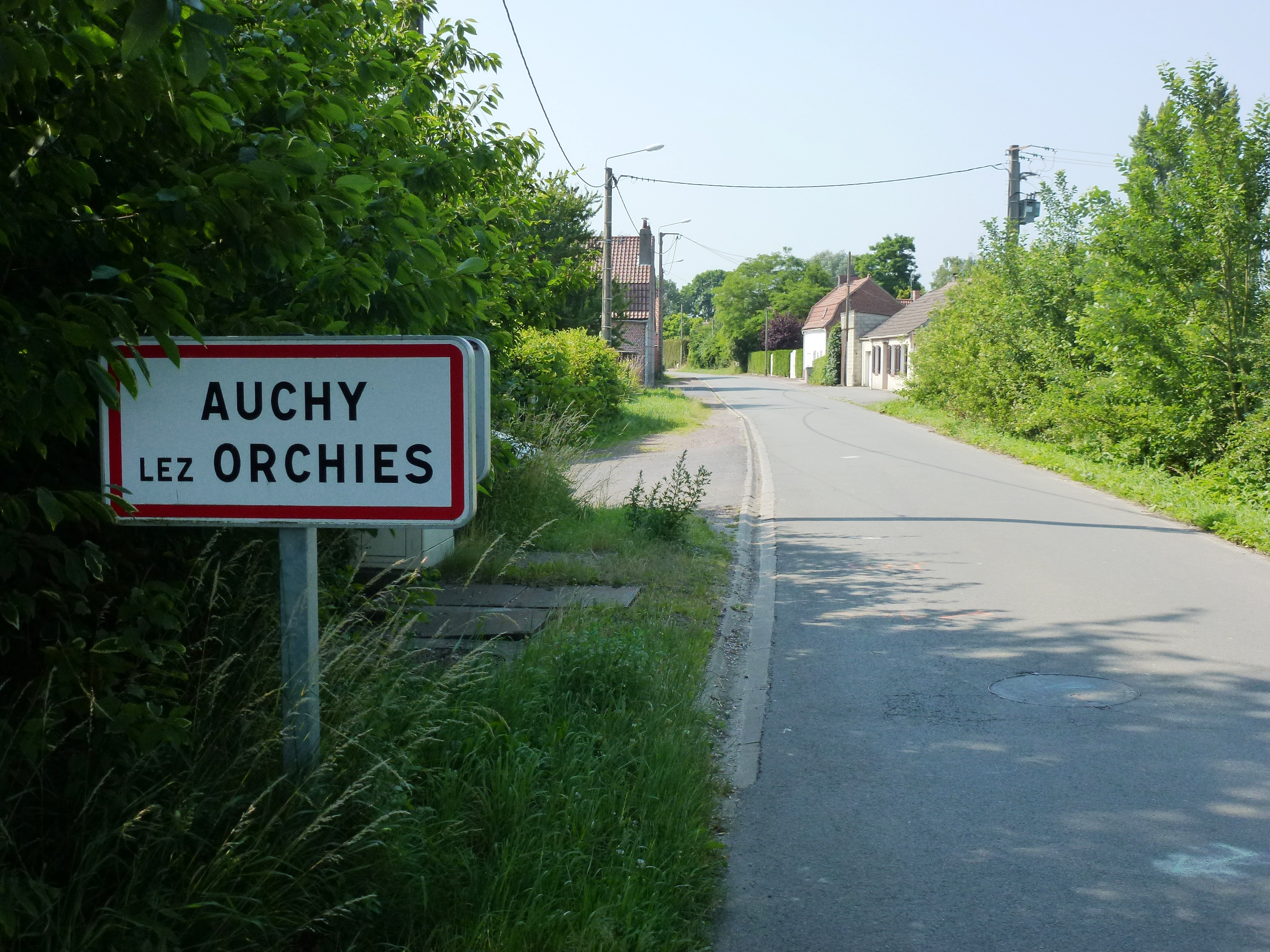
- The road into Auchy-lez-Orchies

- Coat of arms
- Location of Auchy-lez-Orchies
- Location within France Location within Hauts-de-France
- Coordinates: 50°28′49″N 3°12′24″E
- Country: France
- Region: Hauts-de-France
- Department: Nord
- Arrondissement: Douai
- Canton: Orchies
- Intercommunality: Pévèle-Carembault

Government
  - Mayor (2020–2026): Guy Schryve
- Area^{1}: 7.79 km^{2} (3.01 sq mi)
- Elevation: 50 m (160 ft)
- Highest elevation: 52 m (171 ft)
- Lowest elevation: 32 m (105 ft)
- Population (2023): 1,599
  - Density: 205/km^{2} (532/sq mi)
- Time zone: UTC+01:00 (CET)
  - Summer (DST): UTC+02:00 (CEST)
- INSEE/Postal code: 59029 /59310
- ^{1} French Land Register data, which excludes lakes, ponds, glaciers > 1 km^{2} (0.386 sq mi or 247 acres) and river estuaries.

Auchy-lez-Orchies (French pronunciation: [oʃi lez‿ɔʁʃi], literally Auchy near Orchies, before 1962: Auchy) is a commune in the Nord department in northern France.

== Population ==
Historical population
| Year | Pop. | ±% p.a. |
|---|---|---|
| 1968 | 889 | — |
| 1975 | 887 | −0.03% |
| 1982 | 1,038 | +2.27% |
| 1990 | 1,142 | +1.20% |
| 1999 | 1,156 | +0.14% |
| 2007 | 1,399 | +2.41% |
| 2012 | 1,504 | +1.46% |
| 2017 | 1,521 | +0.23% |
| 2023 | 1,599 | +0.84% |
Source: INSEE

== Heraldry ==
| Arms of Auchy-lez-Orchies | The arms of Auchy-lez-Orchies are blazoned : Azure, on a bend argent, 3 saltires couped ?raguly? gules. |

== See also ==
- Communes of the Nord department
