= Ligré =

- Commune
- Location of Ligré
- Location within France Location within Centre-Val de Loire
- Coordinates: 47°06′47″N 0°16′34″E
- Country: France
- Region: Centre-Val de Loire
- Department: Indre-et-Loire
- Arrondissement: Chinon
- Canton: Sainte-Maure-de-Touraine
- Intercommunality: Touraine Val de Vienne

Government
  - Mayor (2020–2026): Bernard Thivel
- Area^{1}: 27.7 km^{2} (10.7 sq mi)
- Highest elevation: 111 m (364 ft)
- Lowest elevation: 31 m (102 ft)
- Population (2023): 1,068
  - Density: 38.6/km^{2} (99.9/sq mi)
- Time zone: UTC+01:00 (CET)
  - Summer (DST): UTC+02:00 (CEST)
- INSEE/Postal code: 37129 /37500
- ^{1} French Land Register data, which excludes lakes, ponds, glaciers > 1 km^{2} (0.386 sq mi or 247 acres) and river estuaries.

Ligré (French pronunciation: [liɡʁe]) is a commune in the Indre-et-Loire department in central France.

== Population ==
Historical population
Year	Pop.	±% p.a.
1968	802	—
1975	705	−1.82%
1982	792	+1.68%
1990	903	+1.65%
1999	966	+0.75%
2007	1,027	+0.77%
2012	1,052	+0.48%
2017	1,065	+0.25%
2023	1,068	+0.05%
Source: INSEE

== See also ==
- Communes of the Indre-et-Loire department
