= Treaty of Montreuil (1274) =

1274 treaty between England and Flanders

The 1274 Treaty of Montreuil or Montreuil-sur-Mer was an agreement between Edward I of England and Guy, Count of Flanders, finalised at Montreuil in the County of Ponthieu on 28 July 1274. It provided for the free movement of merchants between their territories and effectively abolished customs previously charged on English merchants in Flanders. It ended a four-year trade war that had begun on 1 September 1270 when Margaret of Constantinople, Guy's mother and joint countess of Flanders, impounded the wares of English merchants in Flanders for their king's non-payment of a money fief.

The commercial dispute was devastating to the cloth towns of the County of Flanders, which had come to rely on English wool. Under the terms of the treaty, a joint committee of four Flemish and four English merchants chaired by two English administrators was established to inquire into the financial losses on either side and report by Easter 1275. Whichever side had suffered the least was to reimburse the difference.

== See also ==
- English wool trade
