= Flines-lez-Raches =

- Commune
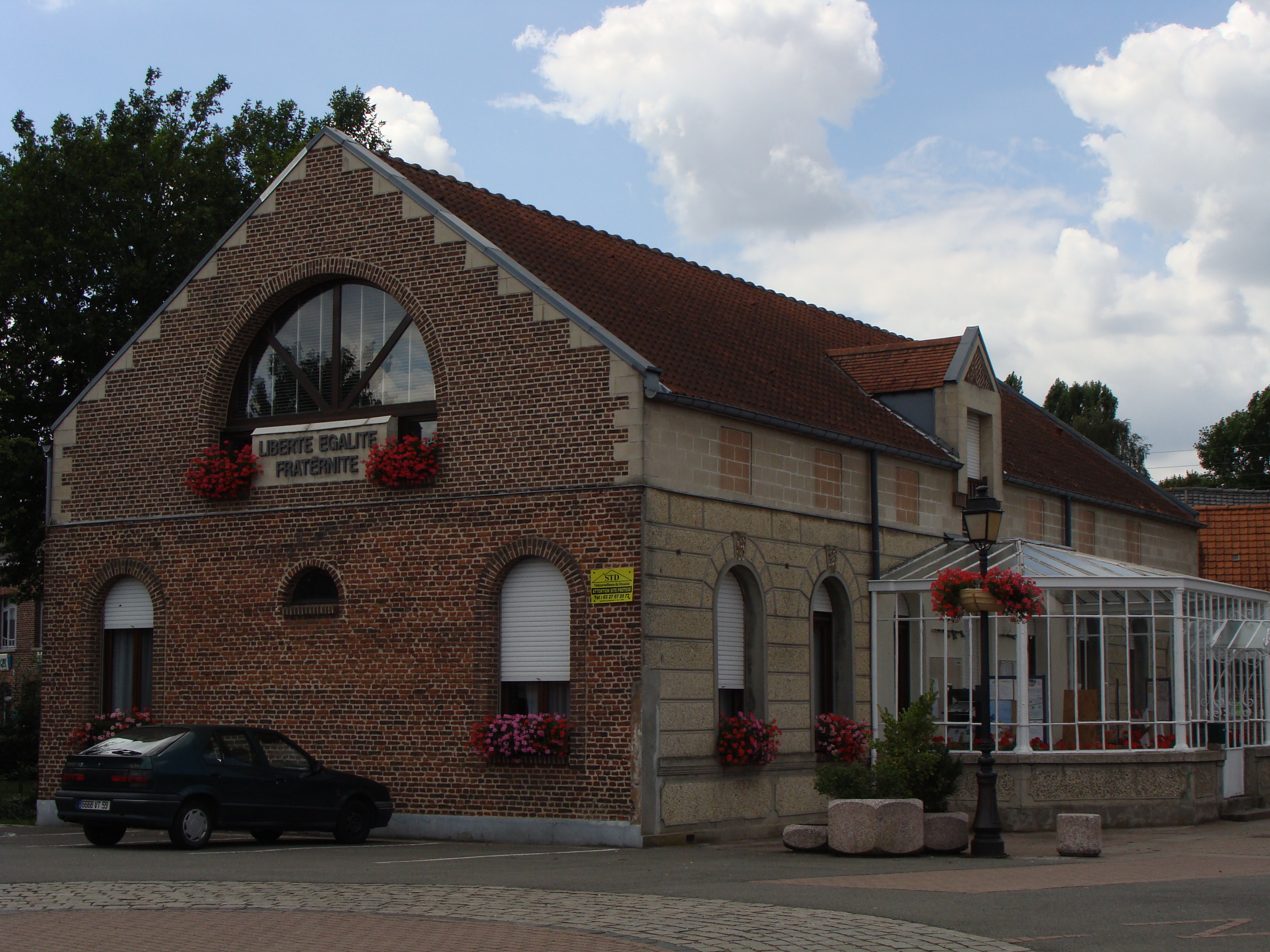
- The town hall in Flines-lez-Raches

- Coat of arms
- Location of Flines-lez-Raches
- Location within France Location within Hauts-de-France
- Coordinates: 50°25′37″N 3°10′59″E
- Country: France
- Region: Hauts-de-France
- Department: Nord
- Arrondissement: Douai
- Canton: Orchies
- Intercommunality: Douaisis Agglo

Government
  - Mayor (2020–2026): Annie Goupil-Deregnaucourt
- Area^{1}: 19.22 km^{2} (7.42 sq mi)
- Elevation: 24 m (79 ft)
- Highest elevation: 40 m (130 ft)
- Lowest elevation: 15 m (49 ft)
- Population (2023): 5,745
  - Density: 298.9/km^{2} (774.2/sq mi)
- Time zone: UTC+01:00 (CET)
  - Summer (DST): UTC+02:00 (CEST)
- INSEE/Postal code: 59239 /59148
- ^{1} French Land Register data, which excludes lakes, ponds, glaciers > 1 km^{2} (0.386 sq mi or 247 acres) and river estuaries.

Flines-lez-Raches (French pronunciation: [flin le ʁaʃ], literally Flines near Raches) is a commune in the Nord department in northern France.

It was once the site of Flines Abbey.

== Population ==
Historical population
Year	Pop.	±% p.a.
1968	5,095	—
1975	5,047	−0.14%
1982	5,098	+0.14%
1990	5,294	+0.47%
1999	5,441	+0.30%
2007	5,447	+0.01%
2012	5,495	+0.18%
2017	5,570	+0.27%
2023	5,745	+0.52%
Source: INSEE

== Heraldry ==
Arms of Flines-lez-Raches	The arms of Flines-lez-Raches are blazoned : Or, a lion sable armed and langued gules. ('Flanders' and the communes of Thourotte, Crépy-en-Valois, Bollezeele, Feignies, Flines-lez-Raches and Wormhout use the same arms.)

== See also ==
- Communes of the Nord department
