= Nomain =

- Commune
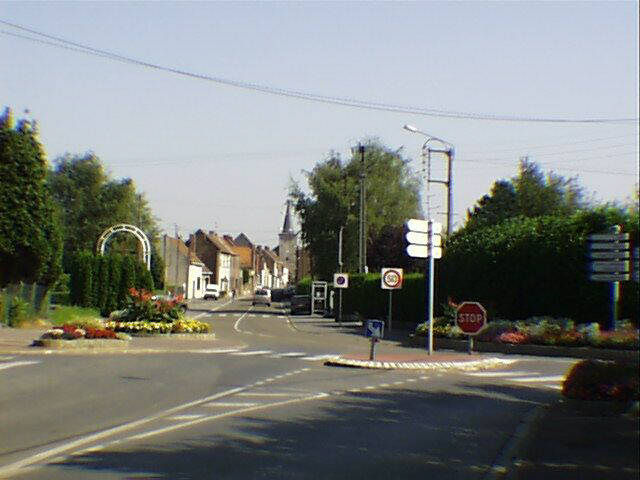
- A view within Nomain

- Coat of arms
- Location of Nomain
- Location within France Location within Hauts-de-France
- Coordinates: 50°29′58″N 3°15′04″E
- Country: France
- Region: Hauts-de-France
- Department: Nord
- Arrondissement: Douai
- Canton: Orchies
- Intercommunality: CC Pévèle-Carembault

Government
  - Mayor (2020–2026): Pascal Delplanque
- Area^{1}: 19.11 km^{2} (7.38 sq mi)
- Elevation: 45 m (148 ft)
- Highest elevation: 58 m (190 ft)
- Lowest elevation: 28 m (92 ft)
- Population (2023): 2,651
  - Density: 138.7/km^{2} (359.3/sq mi)
- Time zone: UTC+01:00 (CET)
  - Summer (DST): UTC+02:00 (CEST)
- INSEE/Postal code: 59435 /59310
- ^{1} French Land Register data, which excludes lakes, ponds, glaciers > 1 km^{2} (0.386 sq mi or 247 acres) and river estuaries.

Nomain (French pronunciation: [nɔmɛ̃]) is a commune in the Nord department in northern France.

== Population ==
Historical population
Year	Pop.	±% p.a.
1968	1,700	—
1975	1,760	+0.50%
1982	1,967	+1.60%
1990	2,317	+2.07%
1999	2,393	+0.36%
2007	2,447	+0.28%
2012	2,470	+0.19%
2017	2,521	+0.41%
2023	2,651	+0.84%
Source: INSEE

== Heraldry ==
Arms of Nomain	The arms of Nomain are blazoned : Gules, 3 busts proper each with a blindfold azure.

== See also ==
- Communes of the Nord department
