= Coutiches =

- Commune
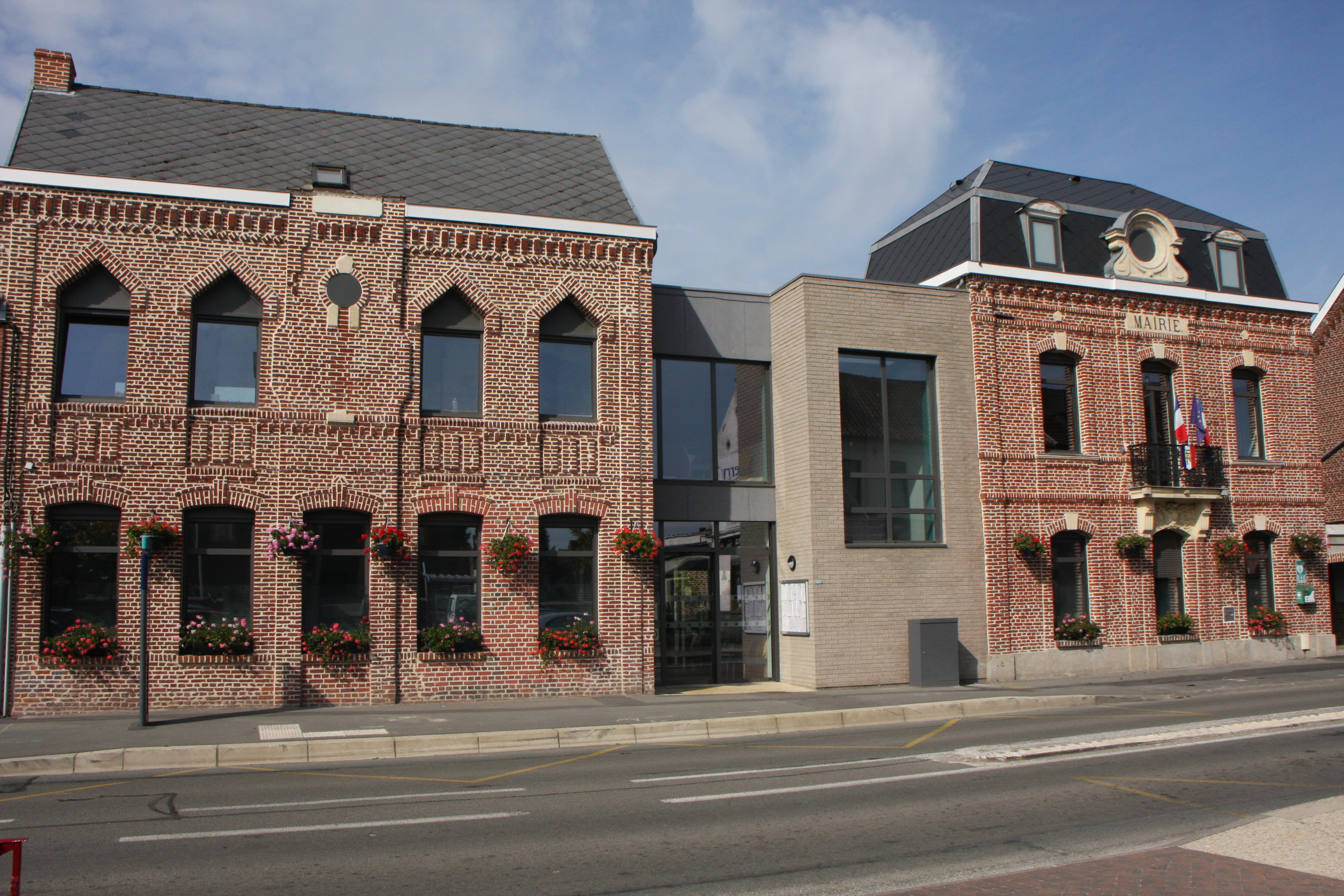
- The town hall in Coutiches

- Coat of arms
- Location of Coutiches
- Location within France Location within Hauts-de-France
- Coordinates: 50°27′21″N 3°12′15″E
- Country: France
- Region: Hauts-de-France
- Department: Nord
- Arrondissement: Douai
- Canton: Orchies
- Intercommunality: Pévèle-Carembault

Government
  - Mayor (2022–2026): Pascal Fromont
- Area^{1}: 16.34 km^{2} (6.31 sq mi)
- Elevation: 24 m (79 ft)
- Highest elevation: 48 m (157 ft)
- Lowest elevation: 17 m (56 ft)
- Population (2023): 3,436
  - Density: 210.3/km^{2} (544.6/sq mi)
- Time zone: UTC+01:00 (CET)
  - Summer (DST): UTC+02:00 (CEST)
- INSEE/Postal code: 59158 /59310
- ^{1} French Land Register data, which excludes lakes, ponds, glaciers > 1 km^{2} (0.386 sq mi or 247 acres) and river estuaries.

Coutiches (French pronunciation: [kutiʃ]) is a commune in the Nord department in northern France.

== Population ==
Historical population
Year	Pop.	±% p.a.
1968	1,549	—
1975	1,516	−0.31%
1982	1,517	+0.01%
1990	2,051	+3.84%
1999	2,235	+0.96%
2007	2,500	+1.41%
2012	2,852	+2.67%
2017	3,014	+1.11%
2023	3,436	+2.21%
Source: INSEE

== Heraldry ==
Arms of Coutiches	The arms of Coutiches are blazoned : Gules, on a chief Or, 3 mullets pierced sable.

== See also ==
- Communes of the Nord department
