= Wormhout =

- Commune
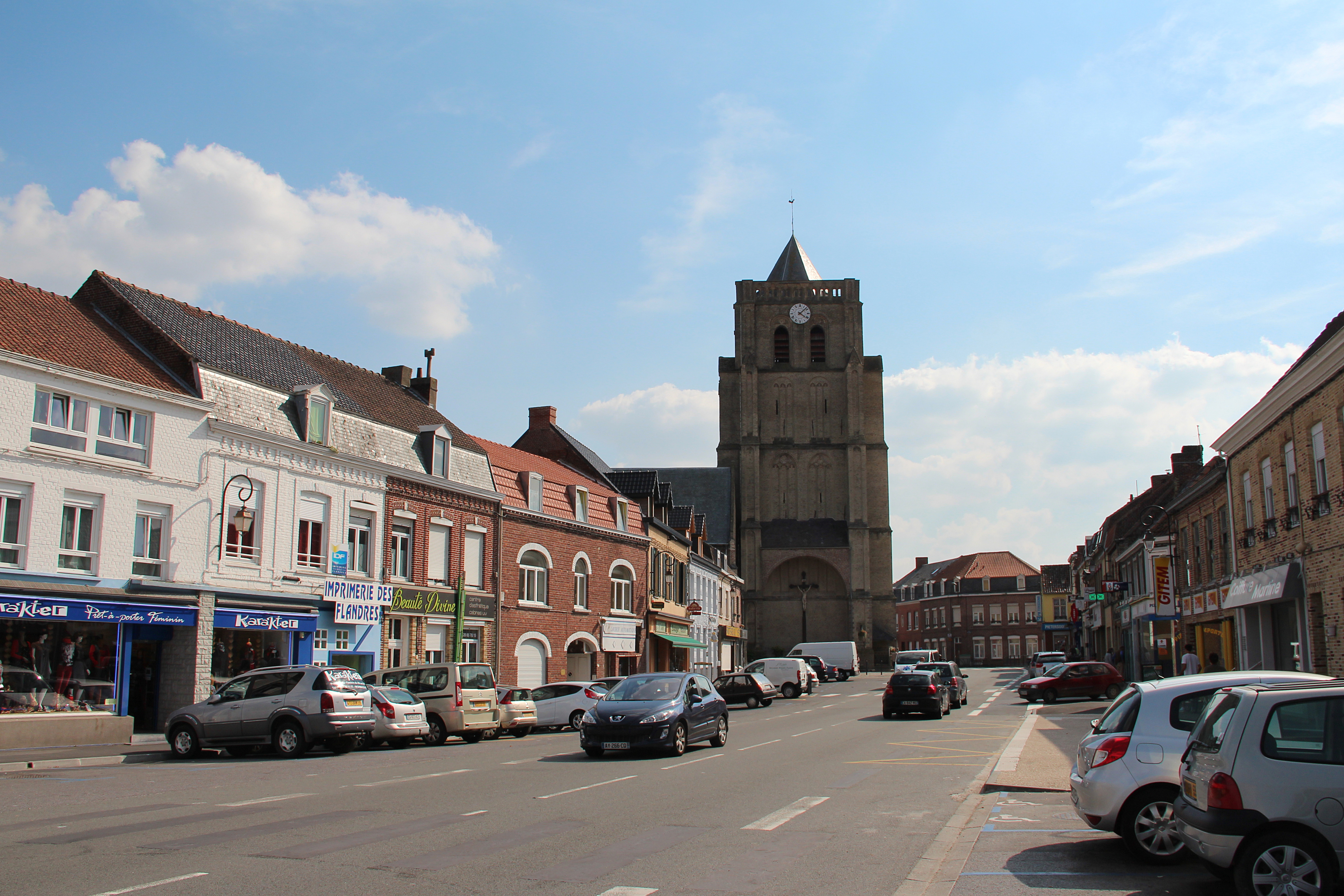
- The church in Wormhout

- Coat of arms
- Location of Wormhout
- Location within France Location within Hauts-de-France
- Coordinates: 50°53′00″N 2°28′07″E
- Country: France
- Region: Hauts-de-France
- Department: Nord
- Arrondissement: Dunkerque
- Canton: Wormhout
- Intercommunality: Hauts de Flandre

Government
  - Mayor (2023–2026): David Calcoen
- Area^{1}: 27.41 km^{2} (10.58 sq mi)
- Elevation: 19 m (62 ft)
- Highest elevation: 33 m (108 ft)
- Lowest elevation: 5 m (16 ft)
- Population (2023): 5,584
  - Density: 203.7/km^{2} (527.6/sq mi)
- Demonym: Wormhoutois
- Time zone: UTC+01:00 (CET)
  - Summer (DST): UTC+02:00 (CEST)
- INSEE/Postal code: 59663 /59470
- ^{1} French Land Register data, which excludes lakes, ponds, glaciers > 1 km^{2} (0.386 sq mi or 247 acres) and river estuaries.

Wormhout (French pronunciation: [wɔʁmut]; before 1975: Wormhoudt; West Flemish: Wormout) is a commune in the Nord department in northern France. Several people in Wormhout still speak West Flemish, a local dialect of Dutch and the traditional language of the region, while French-speakers form a majority, due to centuries of French political and cultural influence.

The town's name is of Germanic origin, meaning "Wormwood."

Neighbouring towns and villages :

- Ledringhem to the south-west, separated by river Peene Becque
- Esquelbecq

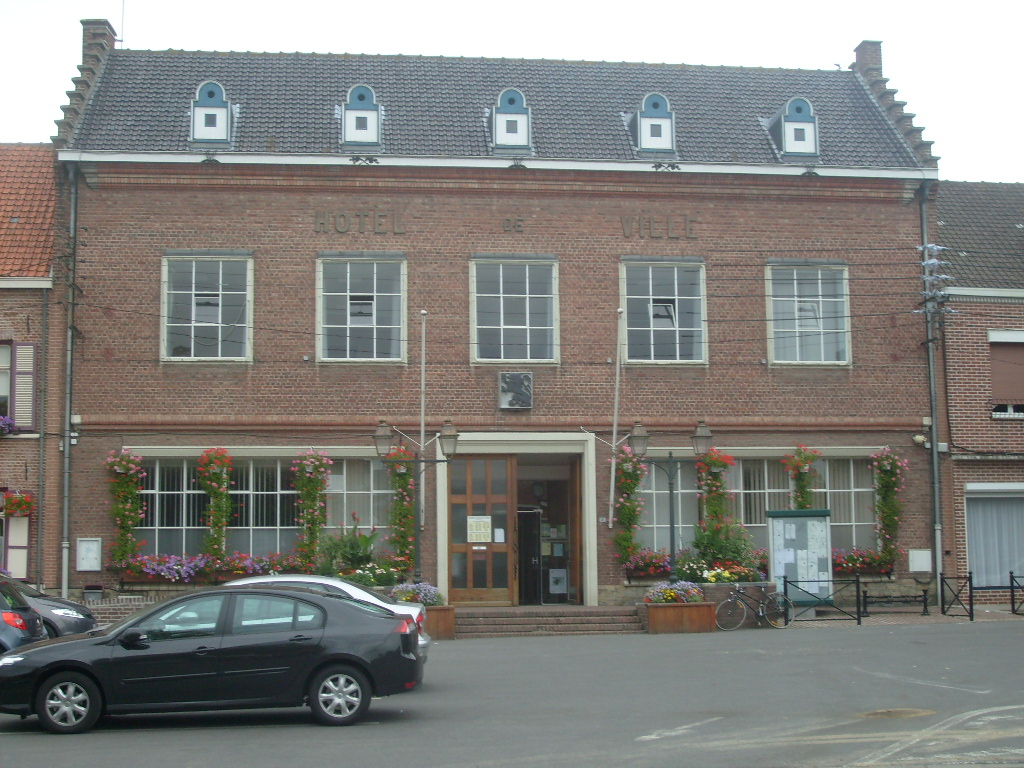
Wormhout town Hall

== Population ==
Historical population
Year	Pop.	±% p.a.
1968	3,004	—
1975	4,332	+5.37%
1982	5,133	+2.45%
1990	5,057	−0.19%
1999	4,984	−0.16%
2007	5,223	+0.59%
2012	5,388	+0.62%
2017	5,632	+0.89%
2023	5,584	−0.14%
Source: INSEE

== Heraldry ==
Arms of Wormhout	The arms of Wormhout are blazoned : Or, a lion sable armed and langued gules. ('Flanders' and the communes of Thourotte, Crépy-en-Valois, Bollezeele, Feignies, Flines-lez-Raches and Wormhout use the same arms.)

== Sights ==
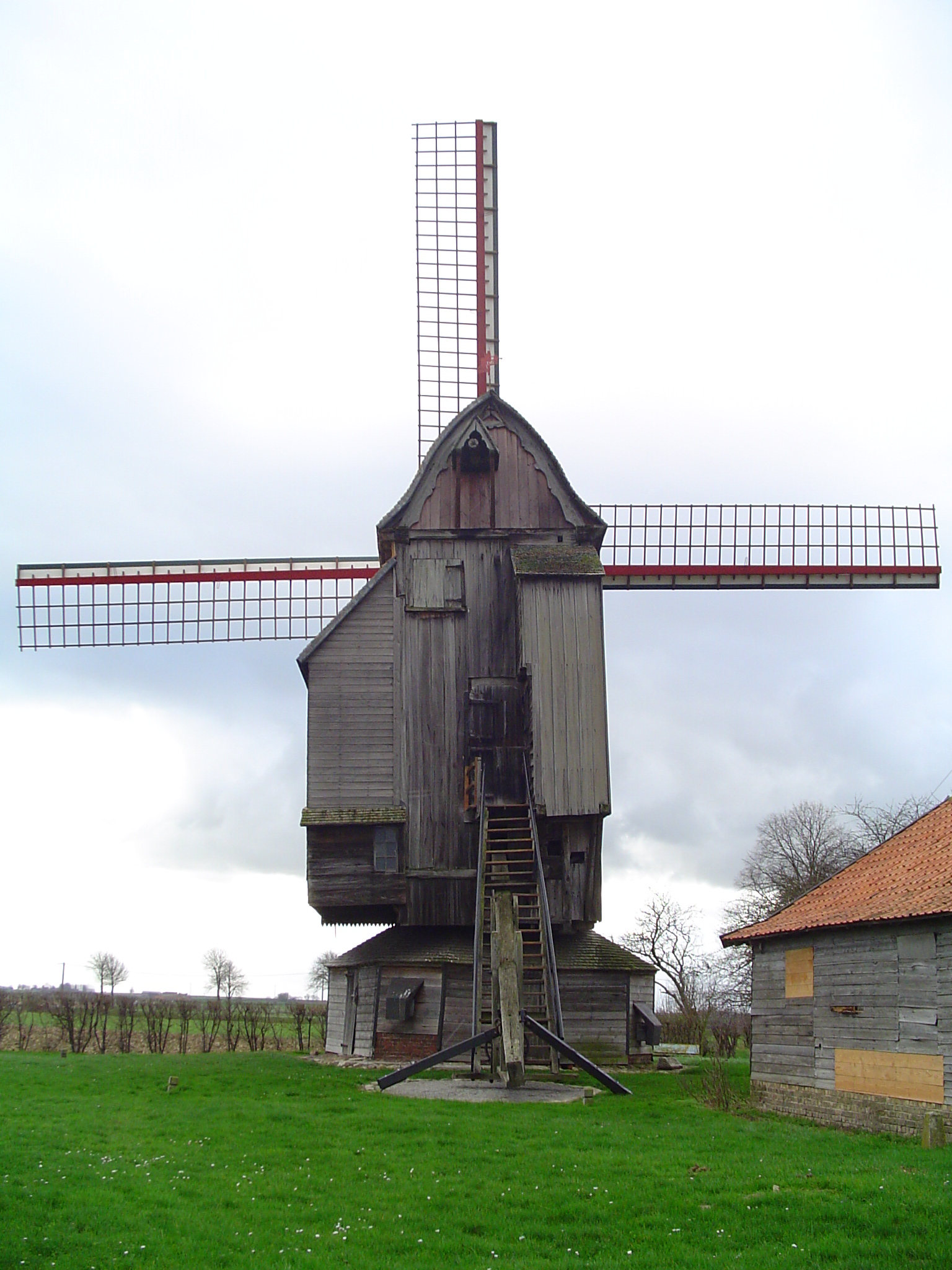
Wormhout wind mill

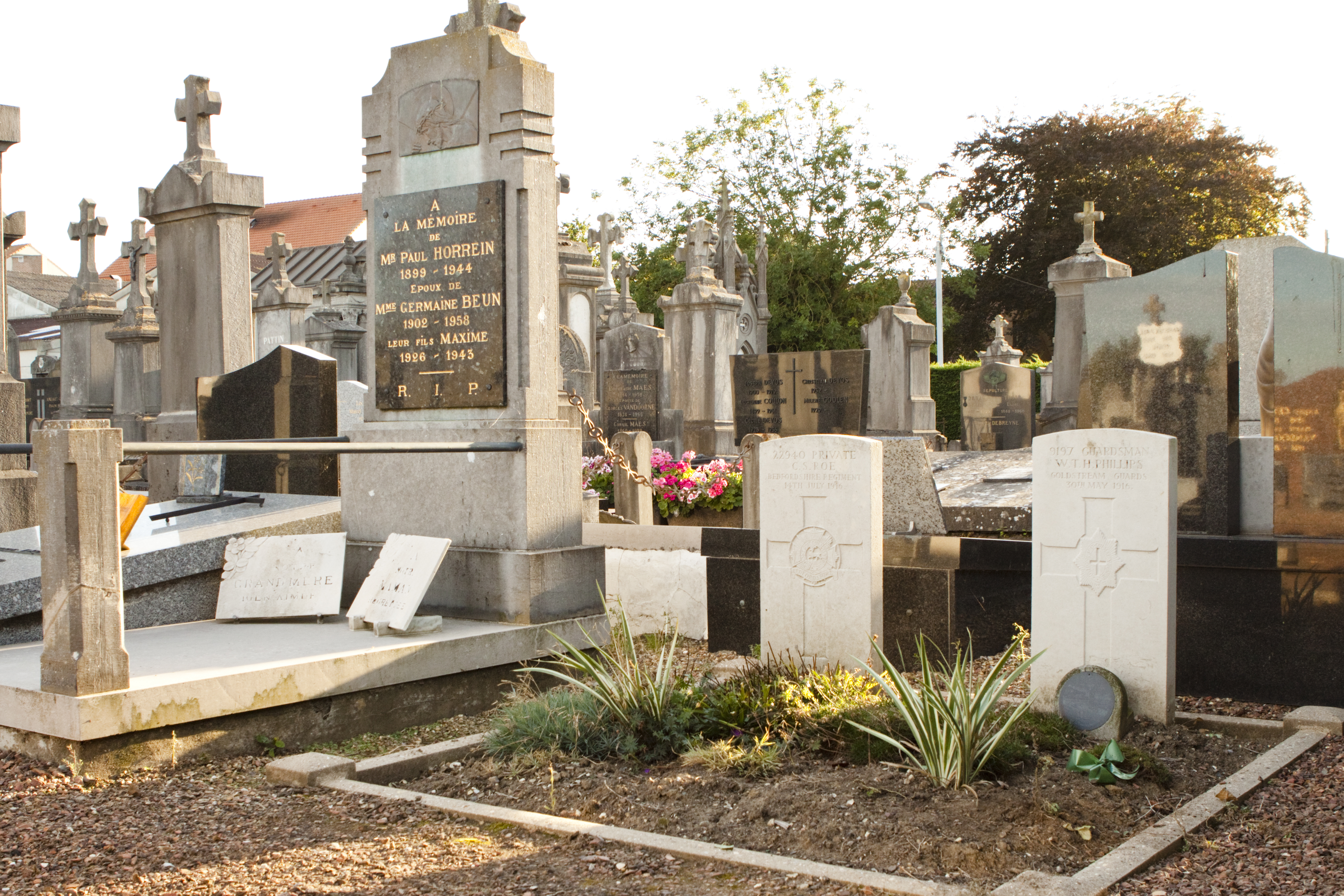
Civilian and two World War I graves at Wormhoudt Communal Cemetery

- Old wind mill
- Jeanne Devos museum
- Wormhoudt Communal Cemetery

== Education ==
Wormhout has a number of school providing education structures for all of the pupils around the town : école du bocage, école Roger Salengro, école Saint-Joseph, collège du Houtland, école Jean Moulin, collège Notre-Dame, lycée de l'Yser.

== Twinnage ==
Wormhout is twinned with the resort town of Llandudno, Conwy, Wales.

== See also ==
- Wormhoudt massacre
- Communes of the Nord department
