= House of Artois =

Cadet branch of the House of Capet

- Parent house: Capetian dynasty
- Country: France
- Founded: 1237; 789 years ago
- Founder: Robert I, Count of Artois
- Final ruler: Charles, Count of Eu
- Titles: Count of Artois; Count of Eu; Count of Foix
- Dissolution: 1472; 554 years ago

The House of Artois was a cadet branch of the Capetian dynasty, descended from Louis VIII the Lion, King of France, through his younger son, Robert (1216 – 1250). Robert received the County of Artois as appanage in his father's will.

In 1297, Robert II, Count of Artois, was one of three Capetian princes to be added to the peerage of France. On his death in 1302, the county was claimed by his daughter Mahaut and his paternal grandson Robert III. The Parlement of Paris ruled in favor of Mahaut, and Robert III was given the lordship of Beaumont-le-Roger as compensation.

Robert later lost his lands by producing false documents in support of his claims in the Artois suit. The county of Artois was inherited by Mahaut's descendants, who married into the House of Burgundy, another branch of the Capetian dynasty.

The sons of Robert III received French titles and fought in the Hundred Years War against the English. The House of Artois became extinct in the male line in 1472.

== Family tree ==
House of Artois

Louis VIII of France
Saint Louis IX of France	Robert I (1216–1250); Count of Artois	Matilda of Brabant	Alphonse, Count of Poitiers	Charles of Anjou
Direct Capetians	Henry I (1244–1274); King of Navarre	Blanche of Artois (1248–1302)	Edmund Crouchback (1245–1296)	Robert II (1250–1302); Count of Artois	Amicie de Courtenay (1250–1275)	House of Anjou-Naples
Otto IV; Count of Burgundy	Mahaut (1268–1329); Countess of Artois	Philip (1269–1298)	Blanche of Brittany	Robert (1271-1272)
Marguerite (1285–1311) x Louis of France; Count of Evreux	Robert III of Artois (1287–1342); Count of Beaumont x Joan of Valois	Isabelle (1288–1344), a nun at Poissy	Joan (1289-c.1347) x Gaston I Count of Foix	Marie (1291–1365) x John I Marquis of Namur	Catherine (+1368) x John II; Count of Aumale
Isabelle de Melun	John (1321–1387); Count of Eu	Joan (1323–1324)	James (1325-c.1347)	Robert (1326-c.1347)	Charles (1328–1385); Count of Pézenas	Joan de Baucay
Simon de Thouars; Count of Dreux	Joan (1353–1368)	John (1355–1363)	Robert IV (1356–1387); Count of Eu	Philippe (1358–1397); Count of Eu	Marie of Berry	Charles (1359–1368)	Isabeau (1361–1379)	Louis (1362-1362)
Joan de Saveuse	Charles (1394–1472); Count of Eu	Hélène de Melun	Philippe (1395–1397)	Philip of Burgundy; Count of Nevers and Rethel	Bonne of Artois (1396–1425)	Philip III the Good; Duke of Burgundy	Catherine (1397–1420)	John of Bourbon; Lord of Carency
