= Sainte-Austreberthe =

Sainte-Austreberthe ("Saint Austrebertha") is the name of two communes in France:

- Sainte-Austreberthe, Pas-de-Calais
- Sainte-Austreberthe, Seine-Maritime
