= Robert of Artois =

Robert of Artois can refer to:

- Robert I of Artois, count of Artois
- Robert II of Artois, count of Artois
- Robert III of Artois, claimant to the County of Artois
- Robert IV of Artois, count of Eu
