= Huby-Saint-Leu =

- Part of Hesdin-la-Forêt
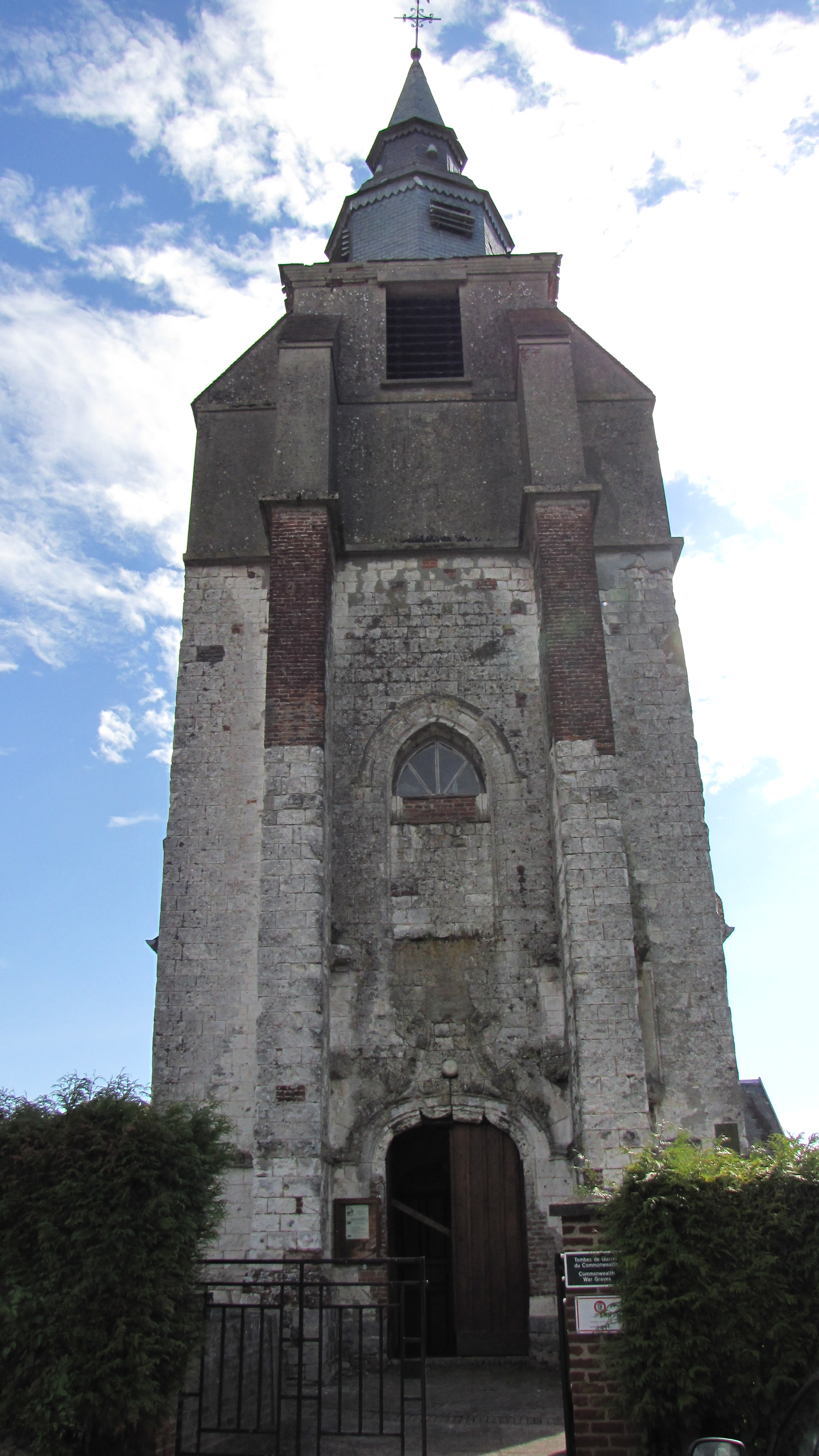
- The church of Huby-Saint-Leu

- Coat of arms
- Location of Huby-Saint-Leu
- Location within France Location within Hauts-de-France
- Coordinates: 50°22′59″N 2°02′17″E
- Country: France
- Region: Hauts-de-France
- Department: Pas-de-Calais
- Arrondissement: Montreuil
- Canton: Auxi-le-Château
- Commune: Hesdin-la-Forêt
- Area^{1}: 12.44 km^{2} (4.80 sq mi)
- Elevation: 110 m (360 ft)
- Highest elevation: 118 m (387 ft)
- Lowest elevation: 21 m (69 ft)
- Population (2022): 840
  - Density: 68/km^{2} (170/sq mi)
- Time zone: UTC+01:00 (CET)
  - Summer (DST): UTC+02:00 (CEST)
- Postal code: 62140
- ^{1} French Land Register data, which excludes lakes, ponds, glaciers > 1 km^{2} (0.386 sq mi or 247 acres) and river estuaries.

Huby-Saint-Leu (French pronunciation: [ybi sɛ̃ lø]) is a former commune in the Pas-de-Calais department in the Hauts-de-France region of France. On 1 January 2025, it was merged into the new commune of Hesdin-la-Forêt.

== Geography ==
Huby-Saint-Leu lies to the north of Hesdin, and is not much more than a suburb of that town. The D928 road to Saint-Omer passes nearby.

== History ==
A military base during World War One. There is a British cemetery at Huby-St-Leu

== Population ==
Historical population
Year	Pop.	±% p.a.
1968	718	—
1975	868	+2.75%
1982	926	+0.93%
1990	1,010	+1.09%
1999	967	−0.48%
2007	951	−0.21%
2012	935	−0.34%
2017	886	−1.07%
Source: INSEE

== See also ==
- Communes of the Pas-de-Calais department
