= Black Sisters =

Black Sisters may refer to:

- Alexian nuns, also called Black Sisters
- Southall Black Sisters
