= Hesdin-la-Forêt =

- Commune
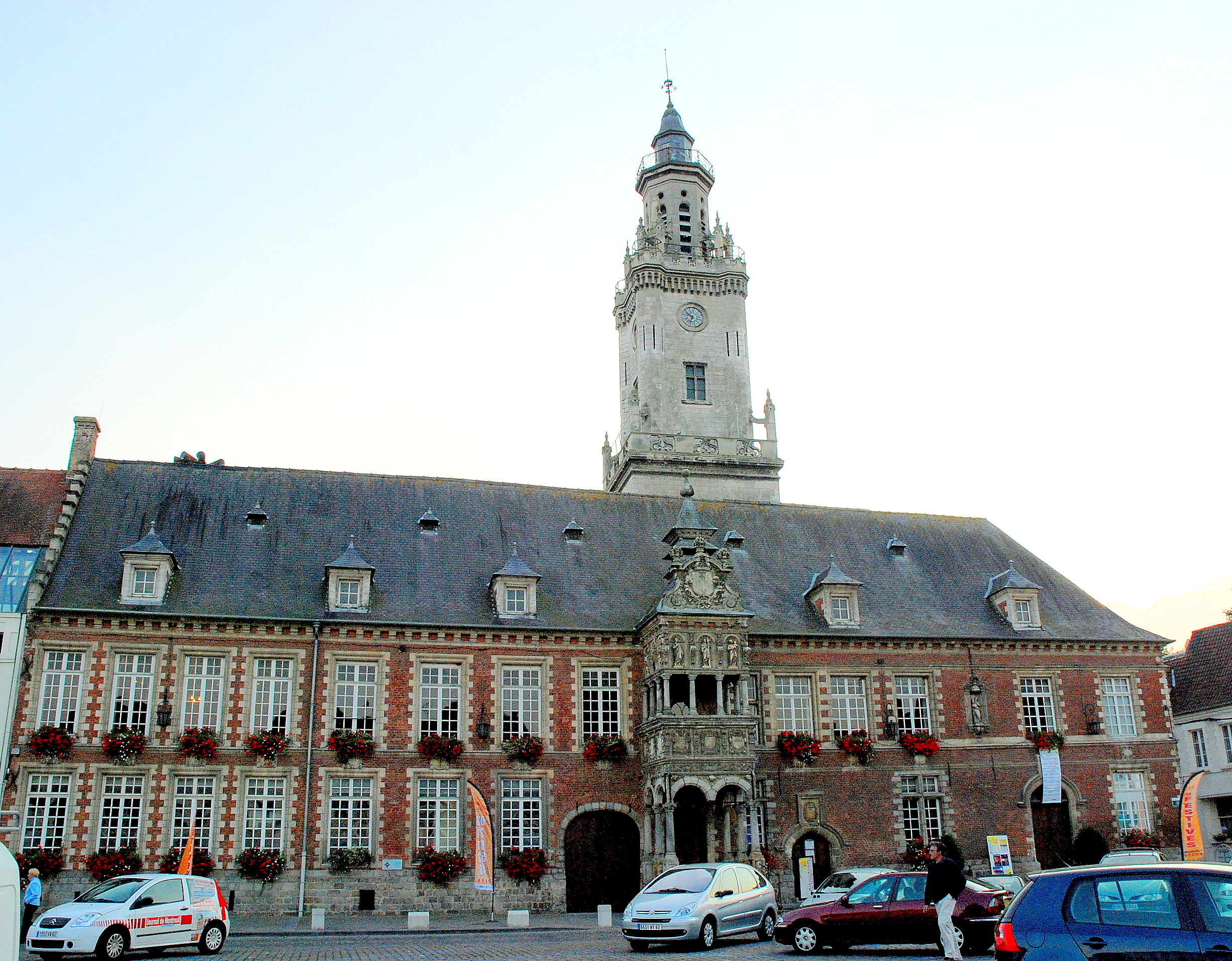
- The Hôtel de Ville
- Location of Hesdin-la-Forêt
- Location within France Location within Hauts-de-France
- Coordinates: 50°22′25″N 2°02′17″E
- Country: France
- Region: Hauts-de-France
- Department: Pas-de-Calais
- Arrondissement: Montreuil
- Canton: Auxi-le-Château
- Intercommunality: CC des 7 Vallées

Government
  - Mayor (2025–2026): Matthieu Demoncheaux
- Area^{1}: 21.26 km^{2} (8.21 sq mi)
- Highest elevation: 130 m (430 ft)
- Lowest elevation: 21 m (69 ft)
- Population (2023): 4,480
  - Density: 211/km^{2} (546/sq mi)
- Time zone: UTC+01:00 (CET)
  - Summer (DST): UTC+02:00 (CEST)
- INSEE/Postal code: 62447 /62140
- Website: hesdin.fr
- ^{1} French Land Register data, which excludes lakes, ponds, glaciers > 1 km^{2} (0.386 sq mi or 247 acres) and river estuaries.

Hesdin-la-Forêt (French pronunciation: [edɛ̃ la fɔʁɛ], lit. 'Hesdin the Forest') is a commune in the Pas-de-Calais department in northern France. It was formed on 1 January 2025, with the merger of Hesdin (the central town of the commune), Huby-Saint-Leu, Marconne and Sainte-Austreberthe.

== Population ==
Population data refer to the area corresponding with the commune as of January 2025.

Historical population
Year	Pop.	±% p.a.
1968	5,314	—
1975	5,797	+1.25%
1982	5,571	−0.57%
1990	5,498	−0.16%
1999	5,295	−0.42%
2007	4,899	−0.97%
2012	4,660	−1.00%
2017	4,605	−0.24%
2023	4,480	−0.46%
Source: INSEE

== See also ==
- Communes of the Pas-de-Calais department
