= Hesdin Castle =

Castle in northern France (destroyed 1553)

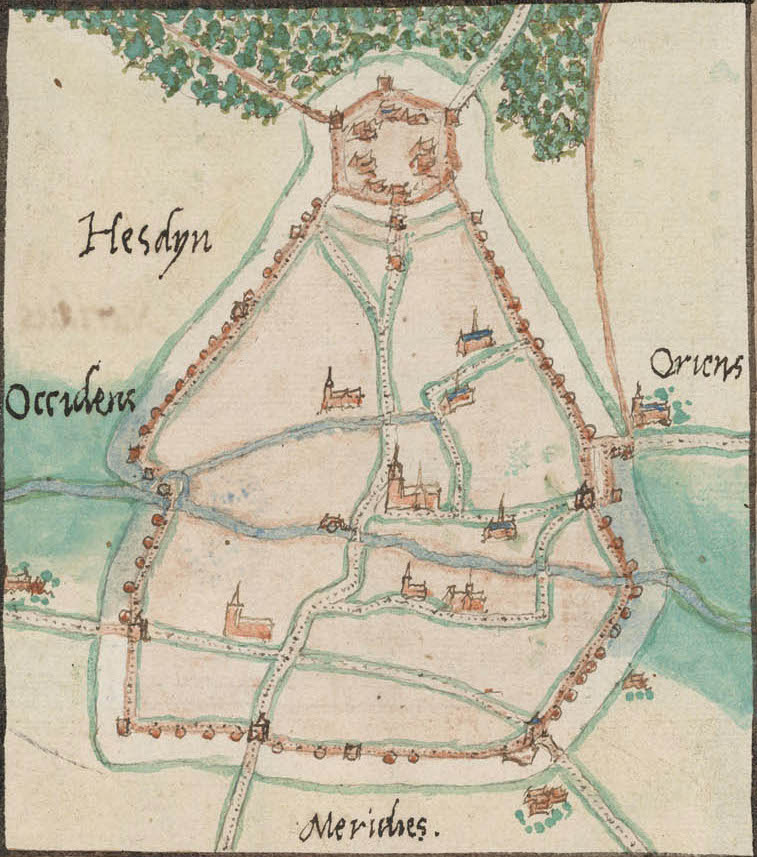
The city of Hesdin with the castle on top on a 16th-century map by Jacob van Deventer

Hesdin Castle (French: Château d’Hesdin; Dutch: Kasteel van Hesdin) located in present-day Vieil-Hesdin in northern France, was an important seat of the Counts of Artois, and hosted various high-ranking guests such as the kings of France, the Counts of Flanders, and the Dukes of Burgundy. Renowned for its magnificent gardens and mechanical wonders, the castle was a prominent site until its destruction by Emperor Charles V in 1553.

The castle originally served as the centre of the County of Hesdin, dating back to the mid-11th century, and over the centuries, it underwent various expansions and enhancements, especially under Robert II of Artois and later the Burgundian dukes, who introduced exotic animals, elaborate automata, and grand architectural features.

Despite its splendour, Hesdin faced several invasions and reconstructions, particularly following the English invasion in 1355 and the subsequent Burgundian renovations. Its automata, detailed in historical accounts and depicted in art by Loyset Liédet, exemplified the castle's unique charm. However, ongoing border conflicts between France and the Habsburg Netherlands in the 16th century led to its eventual demise. After the castle's capture and partial demolition by Charles V's forces in 1553, the site declined significantly. The ruins were excavated in the 19th century, with the archaeological remnants later being protected, preserving the legacy of this once magnificent castle.

== Description ==
The old city of Hesdin (French: Vieil-Hesdin) was shaped like a triangle with the tip facing north. At this tip, separated from the city by the Canche river, was the castle. It was a pentagonal building with a tower at each corner and a keep inside. The walled castle park extended northward over 940 hectares beyond the Ternoise.

== History ==
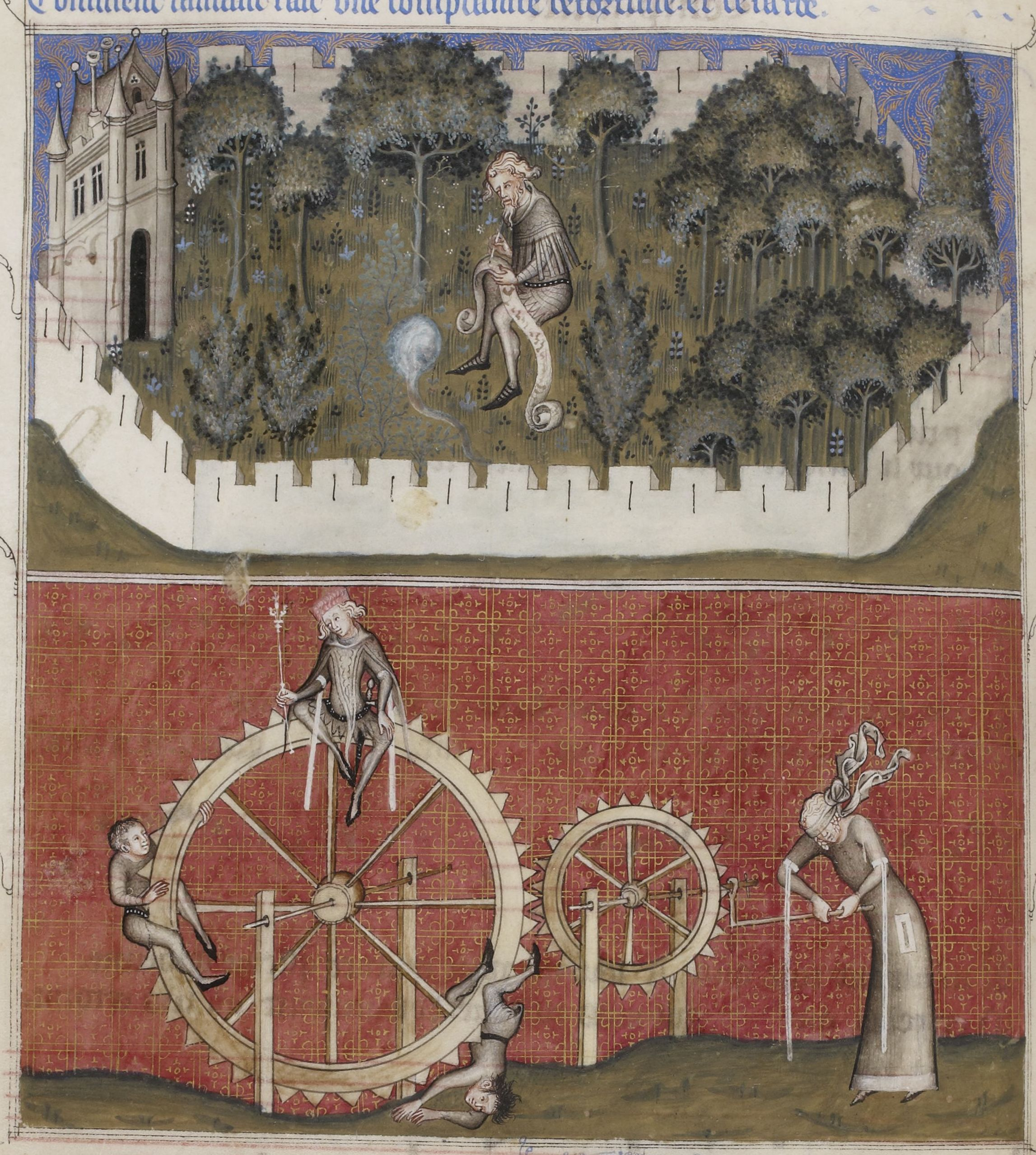
The castle and park of Hesdin in a miniature from around 1350 (in the Remède de Fortune by Guillaume de Machaut). There are no automata in sight, but the gears that Lady Fortuna sets in motion are a clear allusion.

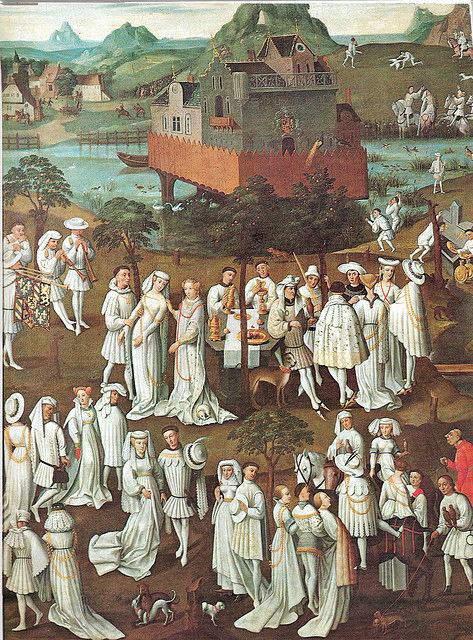
The Hesdin swamp complex may have been depicted on the Love Garden at the Court of Philip the Good

Originally, the castle was the centre of the County of Hesdin, which was probably founded in the mid-11th century. This happened on the territory of the County of Saint-Pol. It is believed that Count Baldwin V of Flanders installed a vassal in Hesdin against his rival from Saint-Pol. The Count of Hesdin was traditionally a peer of Flanders, a hereditary title linked to border defense. The castle first appears in written sources in 1094.

After being damaged by the Normans, Count Baldwin VI of Flanders carried out major repairs in Hesdin in 1067. Walter II, the last Count of Hesdin, rebelled against Flanders and saw his domain confiscated by Charles the Good in 1119. After a few generations, it became part of the territories that count Philip I of Flanders gave as a dowry to the French King Philip II upon the marriage of his niece Isabella of Hainault in 1180. In 1191, it definitively passed from Flanders to France. From the French Crown land, the county was given in apanage to Prince Robert in 1226 to form the new County of Artois with other territories. Robert received this county from his royal brother in 1237.

Robert II of Artois participated in the Eighth Crusade and saw, among other things, the magnificent park of Palermo. He briefly returned from Naples in 1288 to host the French King and Queen in Hesdin. The Romanesque castle was renovated and then rebuilt as a summer residence and hunting lodge. By 1292, Robert had permanently returned with seventeen Italian, Sicilian, and Iberian household members. The most prominent was Rinaldo Crignetti di Barletta, known in French as Renaud Coignet. This architect managed the county, bought large pieces of land to expand the park, and designed buildings. Robert introduced exotic animals such as fallow deer, rabbits, and carp to his park. He also used new techniques to keep herons year-round and established an intensive horse-breeding program. In 1299, Crignetti left for Italy after accusations of extortion and forgery, but the renovation continued. By 1300, a Master of Engines of the Castle was mentioned.

After Robert's death in the Battle of the Golden Spurs, his daughter Mahaut, the new countess, ensured that the park was completed by 1306. Sculptor Master Guissin created the first mechanical sculptures, inspired by French Chivalric romances. There was a menagerie, aviaries, fishponds, orchards, tournament fields, automata, an enclosed garden called Paradis, and a banquet pavilion on stilts. Mechanical monkeys covered in badger fur sat on the bridge to the pavilion. Inside the castle, there was a wing for attractions like a maze and a mirror palace. The gloriette was a high, lavishly lit room or gallery with sculptures, paintings, an interior fountain, and automata. Real and artificial birds competed in song. In 1344, Odo IV of Burgundy placed a gilded tree there.

In November 1355, English King Edward III led an invasion from Calais into northern France, supported by Flemish troops. His army reached Hesdin, entered the park, and destroyed the swamp complex li Marés, but the city and castle were spared. Reconstruction began immediately. By the 1380s, the automata, which required constant maintenance, were out of order.

The splendour of the Burgundians gave Hesdin new life. From 1391, Philip the Bold began remodelling the castle. Around 1410, Hue de Boulogne was appointed painter and governor of the clock, cages, glass windows, and amusement engines of Hesdin, followed around 1450 by Pierre Coustain. Under Philip the Good, the castle was further embellished. In the 1430s, his chamberlain Colart le Voleur replaced and expanded the automata, often designed as teasing traps. A spiral staircase was added between 1459 and 1463. The Duke used the castle for significant events, such as the consecration of John of Burgundy as bishop on 5 May 1440, in the castle chapel. Next to the Palace of Coudenberg in Brussels, the Prinsenhof in Bruges, the Rihour Palace Lille, and the Prinsenhof in Ghent, it was one of his five favourite residences. He impressed high guests at the castle. In 1463-1464 alone, he hosted Christian I of Denmark and an embassy from Emperor Frederick III, and organized peace negotiations with King Louis XI of France and King Edward IV of England. It was also the place where the three-year-old Margaret of Austria was handed over to the French in 1483 for her betrothal at the Château d'Amboise with the Dauphin Charles.

== Destruction ==
In the 16th century, there were constant border wars between France and the Habsburg Netherlands. On 18 July 1553, the troops of Emperor Charles V captured the castle. The two-week siege was decided by a battery of sixteen cannons. The Emperor then ordered the damaged castle to be demolished and a stronger citadel to be built further away. Although often compared to the destruction of Thérouanne a month earlier, the case of Hesdin had very different motives. The destruction lasted only from 23 July to 7 August and was not very thorough. The city was left to its fate and declined into a village. Decades later, Charles's son Philip II of Spain founded the town of Le Parcq on the northern part of the overgrown park.

The ruins were excavated in 1858 by the local architect Clovis Normand. The archaeological remains were protected in 2005.

== In Art ==
The mechanical automata of Hesdin are only known from descriptions in accounts and other writings. The closest to visual representations are the miniatures made by Loyset Liédet from Hesdin for Philip the Good. It is likely that the automata inspired him when illustrating Christine de Pizan's Epistle of Othea (KBR ms. 9392). Furthermore, it has been suggested that the painting "Garden of Love" at the court of Philip the Good, preserved in two copies, depicts the swamp complex of Hesdin.

The castle also found a place in French literature. Guillaume de Machaut has the fleeing narrator of the Remedy of Fortune (ca. 1341–1349) enter the "Park of Hedin." Among the mechanical wonders and natural beauty, which he cannot describe, he composes the lament "Tel rit au main." Around 1450, a work invoking Hesdin to demonstrate the superiority of the French over the English was written. Much was made of the phonetic similarity between Hesdin and Eden. François de Monceaux claimed in "Heden sive paradisus" that Hesdin was located on the site of the original Garden of Eden.

== Literature ==
- Michel Brunet, "Le parc d’attraction des ducs de Bourgogne à Hesdin en 1432. Essai de restitution", in: La Gazette des Beaux-Arts, décembre 1971, t. 78, p. 331-342
- Anne van Buren Hagopian, "Le château d'Hesdin: son plan et sa décoration artistique d'après les documents d'archives", in: Bulletin de la Commission départementale d'Histoire et d'Archéologie de Pas-de-Calais, t. 11, n° 1, 1982
- Anne van Buren Hagopian, "Reality and literary romance in the park of Hesdin", in: Medieval Gardens, ed. Elisabeth Blair MacDoughall, 1986, p. 117-134
- Lambertus Okken, "Abrechnung wegen Hesdin", in: id., Das goldene Haus und die goldene Laube. Wie die Poesie ihren Herren das Paradies einrichtete, 1987, p. 171-187. ISBN 9062036090
- Anne-Elisabeth Cléty, "Les machines extraordinaires d'Hesdin aux XIV^{e} et XV^{e} siècle", in: Sucellus, juni 1997
- Birgit Franke, "Gesellschaftsspiele mit Automaten - 'Merveilles' in Hesdin", in: Marburger Jahrbuch für Kunstwissenschaft, 1997, p. 135-158. doi:10.2307/1348690
- François Duceppe-Lamarre, "Le complexe palatial d'Hesdin et la structuration de l'environnement (nord de la France, XIIIe-XIVe siècles)", in: Medieval Europe, 2002, p. 96-101
- Jean-Marie Cauchies en Jacqueline Guisset (eds.), Le château, autour et alentours (XIVe–XVIe siècles). Paysage, parc, jardin et domaine. Colloque international d'Écaussinnes-Lalaing (Belgique), 18-20 mai 2006, 2008, p. 119-133
