= Loyset Liédet =

Flemish miniaturist and illuminator

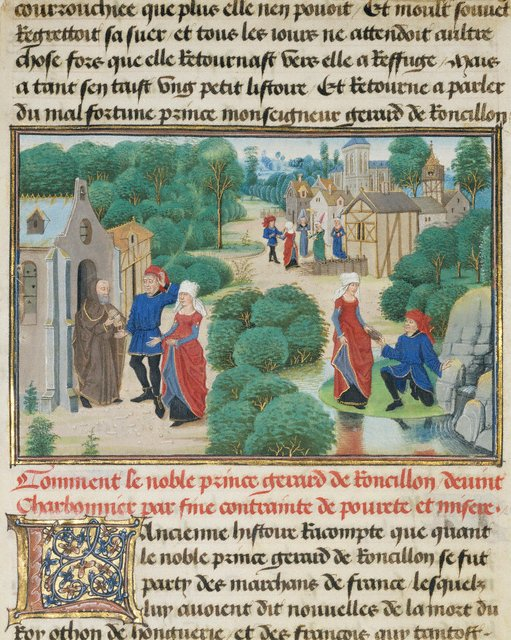
Loyset Liédet – Gerard and Bertha Find Sustenance at a Hermitage, Tempera colors, gold leaf, and gold paint on parchment, J. Paul Getty Museum, written 1463–1465; illuminated 1467–1472

Loyset Liédet (1420 – after 1479, or after 1484), was a Flemish miniaturist and illuminator, running a workshop which may have been of some size. He was very successful, and was patronized by the leading collectors of his day. His work attained the standards of his finest Flemish contemporaries, with whom he often collaborated on large commissions.

== Biography ==
Liédet was a prolific artist coming from Hesdin in Artois. Between 1454 and 1460 he worked in Hesdin where he produced 55 thumbnails for La Fleur des Histoires by Jean Mansel, commissioned by Philip the Good of the House of Valois-Burgundy. He also illustrated Royal Library of Belgium MS 9967, a copy of Jehan Wauquelin's edition of La Belle Hélène de Constantinople and 20 miniatures for Mystère de la Vengeance de Nostre Seigneur Ihesu Crist (Mystery of The Vengeance of Our Lord Jesus Christ) by Eustache Marcadé for Philip, now in the British Library.

He also did some work for Charles the Bold. In his early work, he was influenced by Simon Marmion. After 1467 he was found in Bruges, where he was a member of the Guild of Saint Luke listed as an illuminator. In all probability he continued to work in Bruges until 1479. Liédet was long thought to have died around 1479, the date of the last mention of him in the archives of Bruges. However recent research by Dominique Vanwijnsberghe in the archives of Lille shows that Liédet and his brother Huchon (or Husson) were still listed in the archives of that city in 1483 and 1484.

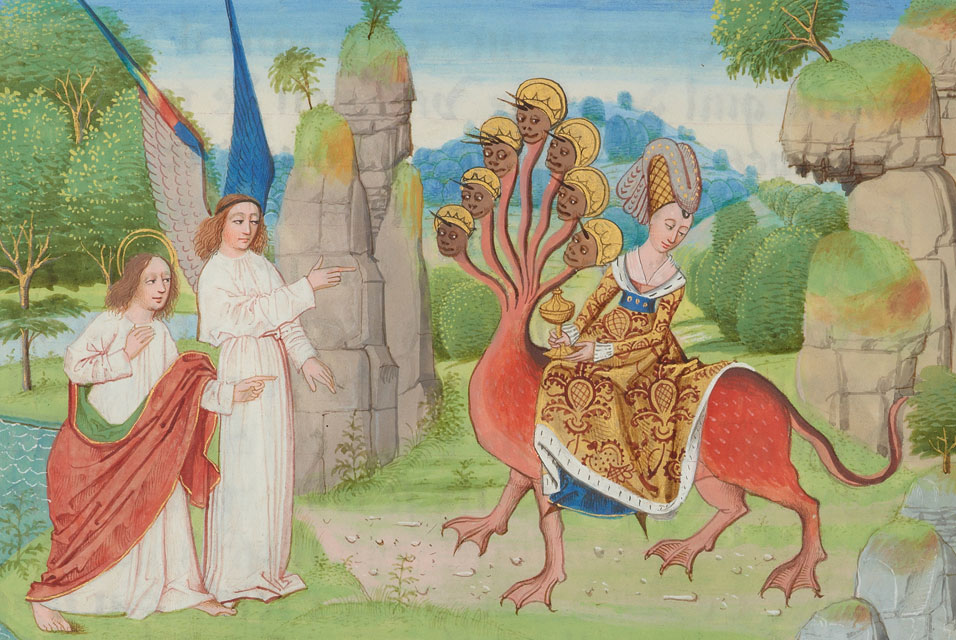
The Whore of Babylon Dresses the Part, c. 1470, Epistolary and Apocalypse of Charles the Bold

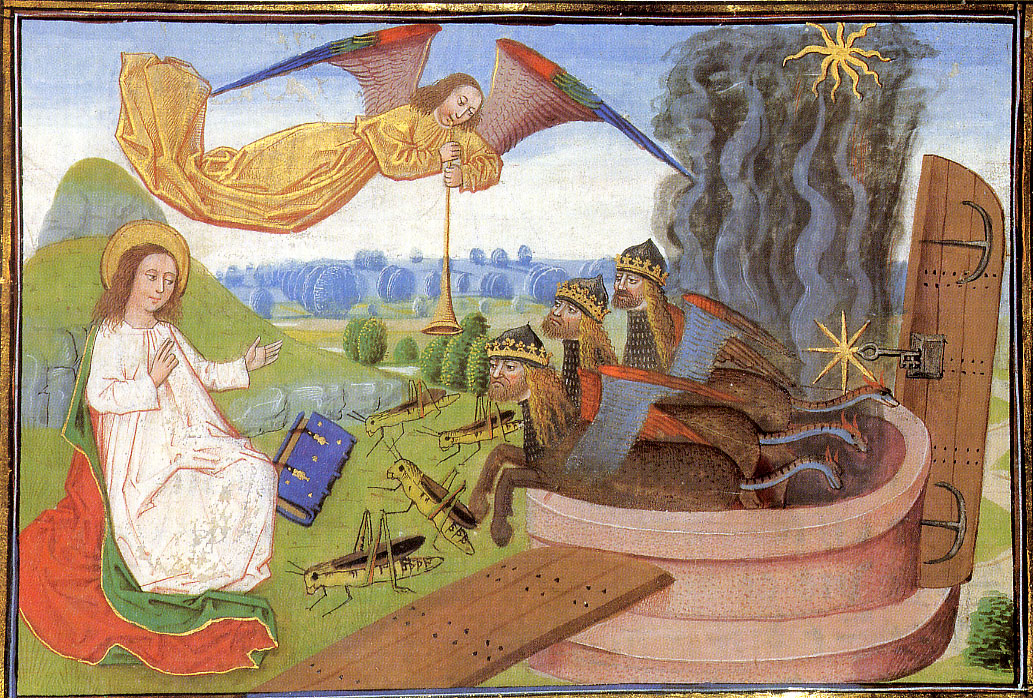
The Fifth Angel Sounding the Trumpet, c. 1470, Epistolary and Apocalypse of Charles the Bold

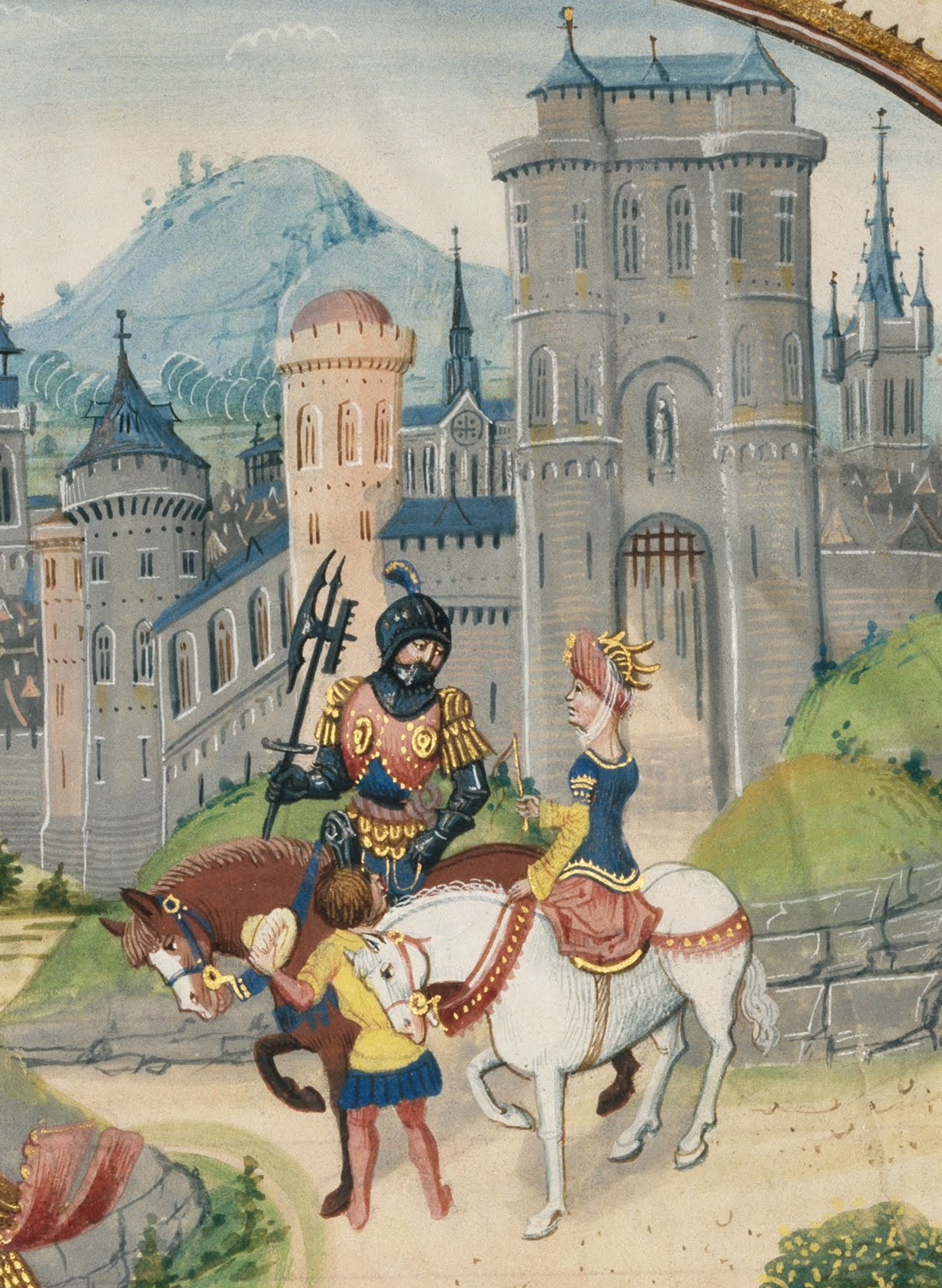
The Abduction of Ydoire, 1467–1472

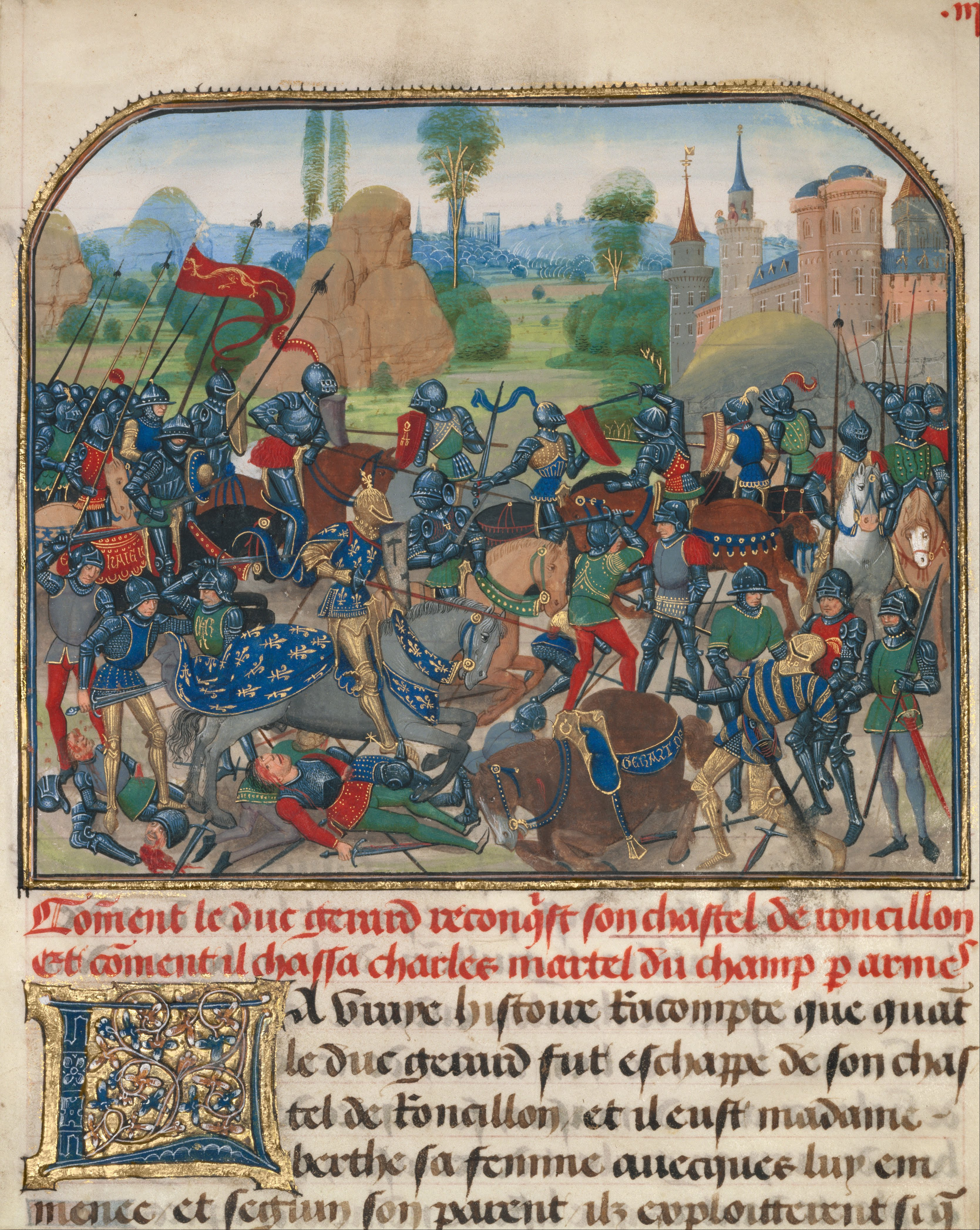
The Battle before Roussillon's Castle, 1467–1472

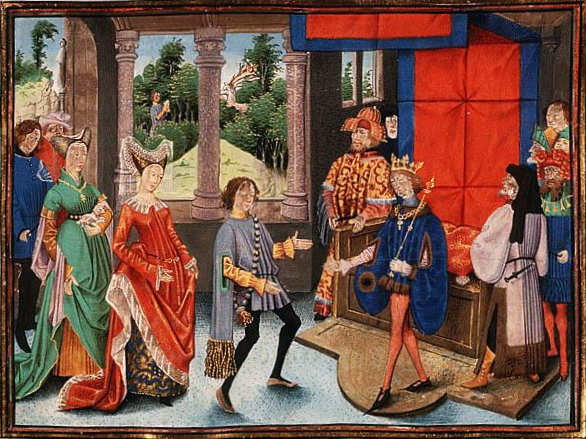
St Hubert of Liège offers his services to Pepin of Heristal, made in 1463 for Philip the Good Duke of Burgundy

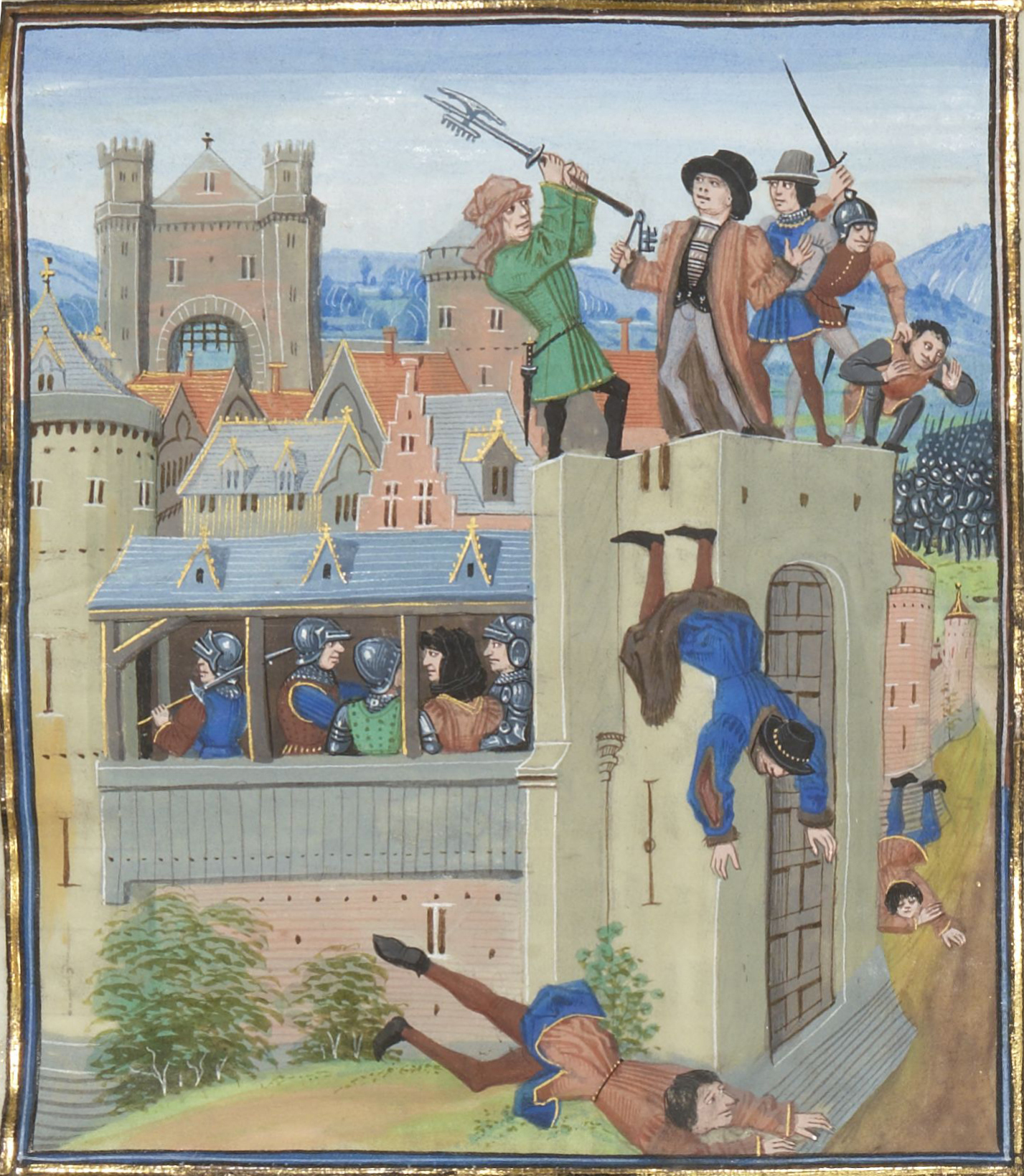
Assassination of Étienne Marcel in 1358, from Jean Froissart, Chroniques, Flandre, Bruges, XVe s., folio 230, recto (BNF, ms. Français 2643).
