= Château de Domfront =

Ruined castle in Normandy, France

Coordinates: 48°35′39″N 0°39′9″W

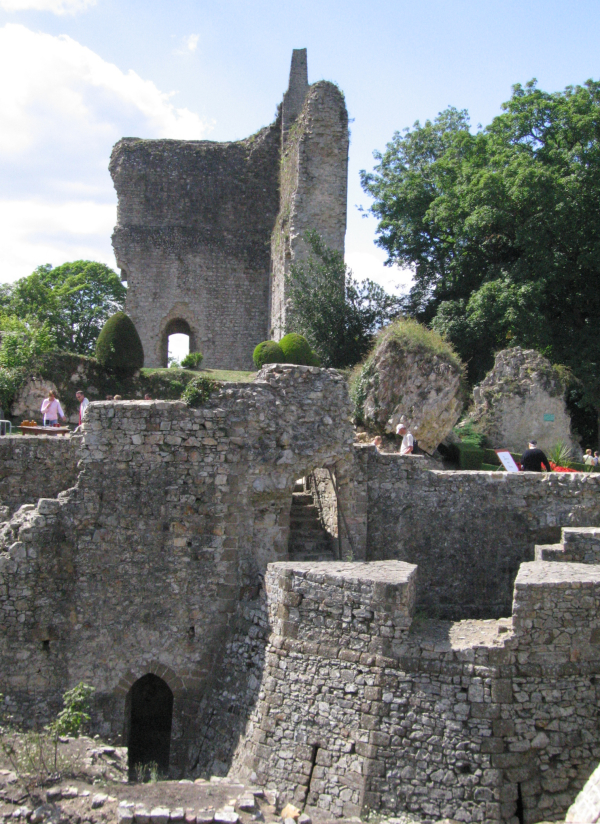

The Château de Domfront is a ruined castle in the town of Domfront, in the Orne département of France.

The Château de Domfront has been protected as a monument historique by the French Ministry of Culture since 1875. The ruins include the keep, the enceinte, ramparts, towers, casemates and the former Sainte-Catherine et Saint-Symphorien chapels. The castle ruins have been repaired since 1984 by the Association pour la Restauration du Château de Domfront.

The ruins stand in a public park and are open to the public free of charge.

== History ==
In 1051, the castle at Domfront, belonging to Guillaume II Talvas, lord of Bellême, and occupied by the forces of Geoffrey of Anjou, was besieged by William the Conqueror, duke of Normandy. In 1092, the people of Domfront revolted against Robert II de Bellême, Earl of Shrewsbury, transferring their allegiance to the third son of William the Conqueror, Henri Beauclerc, who became Duke of Normandy (1106) and King of England (1100).

In 1169, it was at the Château de Domfront that Henry II of England received the papal legates who came to reconcile him with Thomas Becket.

Taken in 1204 - Domfront being the personal possession of John Lackland - it was conceded to first to Renaud de Dammartin, Count of Boulogne, and later to Philippe Hurepel. With the death of his successor, Jeanne, in 1251 Domfront returned to the royal domain.

In 1259, Louis IX of France gave Domfront to Robert II, Count of Artois, as dowry for his wife. After his death (1302), in compensation for not getting Artois, in 1332 his grandson Robert III of Artois was given the Norman property and appanages that had been confiscated.

In 1342, Philip VI of France ceded the Domfront country to the Count of Alençon who, in 1367, reunited Domfront and Alençon.

In the meantime, in 1356, troops of Charles II of Navarre (Charles the Bad), king of Navarre, commanded by Sir Robert Knolles, took the place and held it until 1366.

During the winter of 1417-1418, the castle was besieged by the English commanded by the Duke of Clarence and fell on the 10 July 1418. The French recaptured it for a time in 1430. It was finally taken by the French on 2 August 1450.

Ownership was again disputed in 1466–1467.

In 1574, the Château de Domfront, serving as a refuge for the Count of Montgomery, was besieged by royal troops under the Marshal of Matignon, capitulating on 27 May. The count was beheaded in Paris in 1574 on the orders of the Queen.

Maximilien de Béthune, duc de Sully ordered the demolition of the castle in 1608.

== See also ==
- List of castles in France
