= Marconne =

- Part of Hesdin-la-Forêt
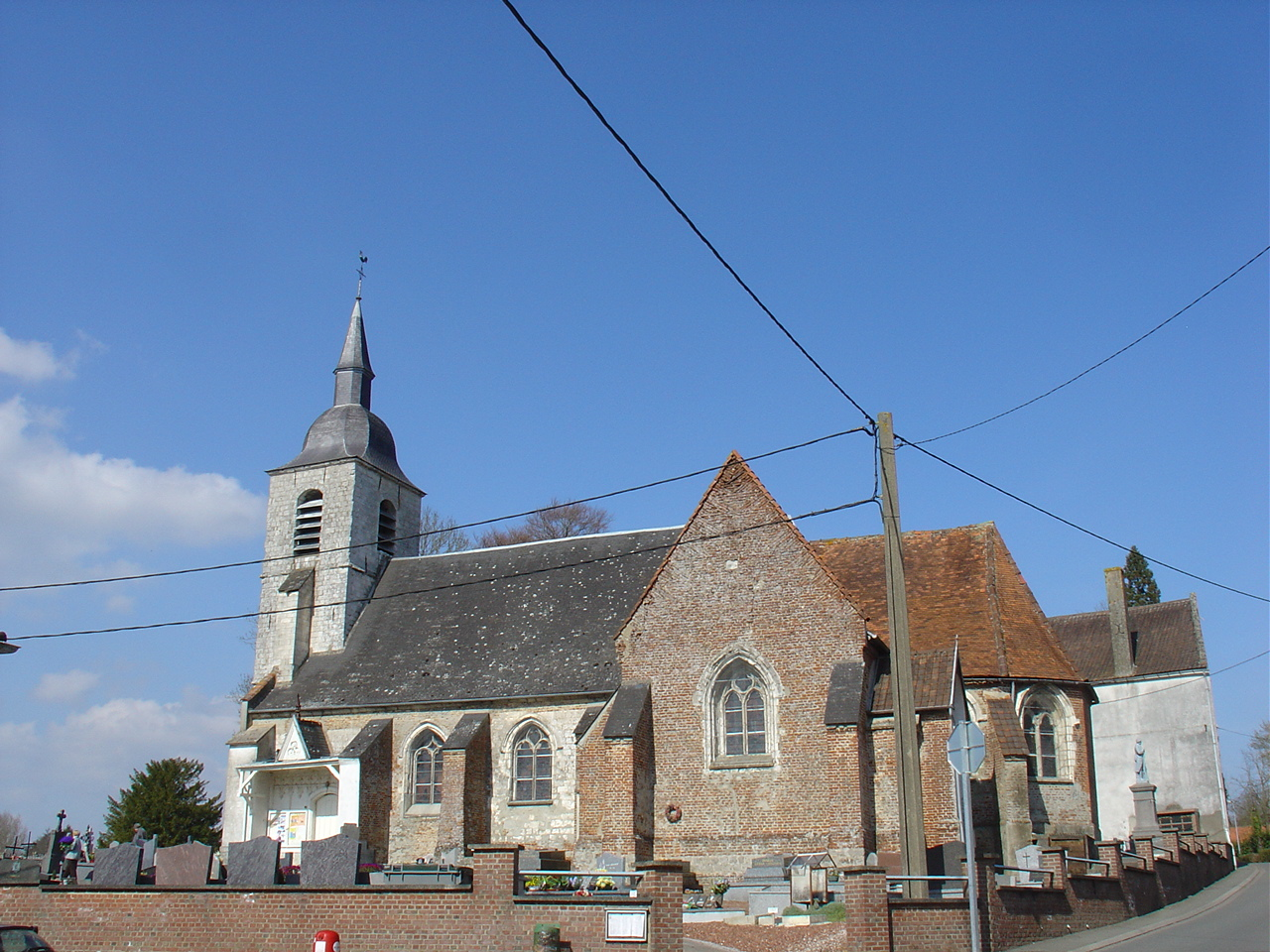
- The church of Marconne

- Coat of arms
- Location of Marconne
- Location within France Location within Hauts-de-France
- Coordinates: 50°22′30″N 2°02′15″E
- Country: France
- Region: Hauts-de-France
- Department: Pas-de-Calais
- Arrondissement: Montreuil
- Canton: Auxi-le-Château
- Commune: Hesdin-la-Forêt
- Area^{1}: 4.18 km^{2} (1.61 sq mi)
- Elevation: 29 m (95 ft)
- Highest elevation: 128 m (420 ft)
- Lowest elevation: 22 m (72 ft)
- Population (2022): 1,067
  - Density: 255/km^{2} (661/sq mi)
- Time zone: UTC+01:00 (CET)
  - Summer (DST): UTC+02:00 (CEST)
- Postal code: 62140
- ^{1} French Land Register data, which excludes lakes, ponds, glaciers > 1 km^{2} (0.386 sq mi or 247 acres) and river estuaries.

Marconne (French pronunciation: [maʁkɔn]) is a former commune in the Pas-de-Calais department in the [Hauts-de-France region of France, 14 miles (22 km) southeast of Montreuil-sur-Mer. On 1 January 2025, it was merged into the new commune of Hesdin-la-Forêt.

== Population ==
Historical population
Year	Pop.	±% p.a.
1968	1,117	—
1975	1,321	+2.43%
1982	1,271	−0.55%
1990	1,367	+0.91%
1999	1,232	−1.15%
2007	1,155	−0.80%
2012	1,120	−0.61%
2017	1,093	−0.49%
Source: INSEE

== See also ==
- Communes of the Pas-de-Calais department
