= Sainte-Austreberthe, Pas-de-Calais =

Sainte-Austreberthe
- Part of Hesdin-la-Forêt
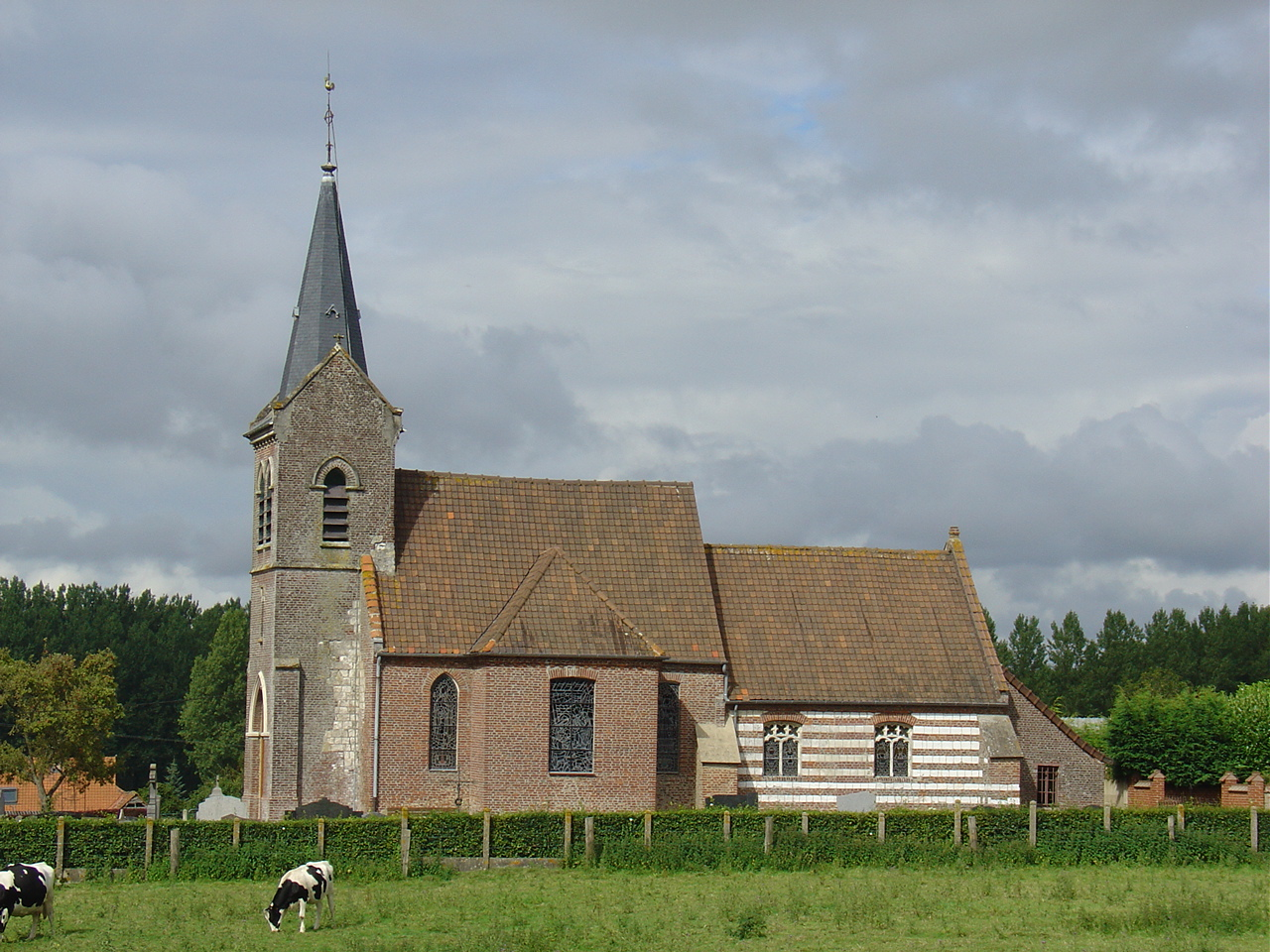
- The church of Sainte-Austreberthe

- Coat of arms
- Location of Sainte-Austreberthe
- Location within France Location within Hauts-de-France
- Coordinates: 50°21′57″N 2°02′45″E
- Country: France
- Region: Hauts-de-France
- Department: Pas-de-Calais
- Arrondissement: Montreuil
- Canton: Auxi-le-Château
- Commune: Hesdin-la-Forêt
- Area^{1}: 3.71 km^{2} (1.43 sq mi)
- Elevation: 42 m (138 ft)
- Highest elevation: 130 m (430 ft)
- Lowest elevation: 26 m (85 ft)
- Population (2022): 362
  - Density: 97.6/km^{2} (253/sq mi)
- Time zone: UTC+01:00 (CET)
  - Summer (DST): UTC+02:00 (CEST)
- Postal code: 62140
- ^{1} French Land Register data, which excludes lakes, ponds, glaciers > 1 km^{2} (0.386 sq mi or 247 acres) and river estuaries.

Sainte-Austreberthe (French pronunciation: [sɛ̃t ɔstʁəbɛʁt]) is a former commune in the Pas-de-Calais department in the Hauts-de-France region of France. On 1 January 2025, it was merged into the new commune of Hesdin-la-Forêt.

== Geography ==
Sainte-Austreberthe is a suburb of Hesdin, located 15 miles (24 km) southeast of Montreuil-sur-Mer at the junction of the D340 and D113 roads.

== Population ==
Historical population
Year	Pop.	±% p.a.
1968	374	—
1975	360	−0.54%
1982	397	+1.41%
1990	408	+0.34%
1999	410	+0.05%
2007	384	−0.82%
2012	427	+2.15%
2017	401	−1.25%
Source: INSEE

== Places of interest ==
- The church of St. Austreberthe, dating from the seventeenth century
- A chapel

== See also ==
- Communes of the Pas-de-Calais department
