= The Vows of the Heron =

Satirical Flemish poem

The Vows of the Heron (Voeux du héron) c.1346 is a satirical Flemish poem, which purported to explain the causes of the Hundred Years' War in terms of the goading into action by a Low Country exile of Edward III of England.

== Background ==
Robert III of Artois, in exile in England, was a significant bone of contention between England and France, as well as a persistent agitator of Edward to take action against France.

== Theme ==
The Vows presents Robert as offering Edward a heron at a royal banquet: "I believe I have caught the most cowardly bird...It is my intention to give the heron to the most cowardly one who lives or has ever lived: that is Edward Louis, disinherited of the noble land of France...because of his cowardice". The poem satirizes Robert as the cunning instigator of the war; and presents Edward as his naïve, blustering victim.

While almost certainly a fictional account, modern historians consider that the poem nonetheless reveals a kind of truth about the relations of the two men, and the approach to war.

== Ethos ==
Johan Huizinga emphasised as typically late medieval in the poem, what he called “the spirit of barbarian crudeness that it reveals”, as well as the self-mockery found within its grimness.

One knight, Jean de Beaumont, is presented as claiming that: “When we are in the tavern, drinking strong wine,/When the ladies pass and look at us….Nature urges us to have desiring hearts/...[But when] our enemies are approaching us,/Then we should wish to be in a cellar so large”.

== See also ==
- Estate satire
- Feast of the Swans
- Froissart
- Skeltonic verse
