= Hôtel de Ville, Hesdin =

Town hall in Hesdin, France

Hôtel de Ville
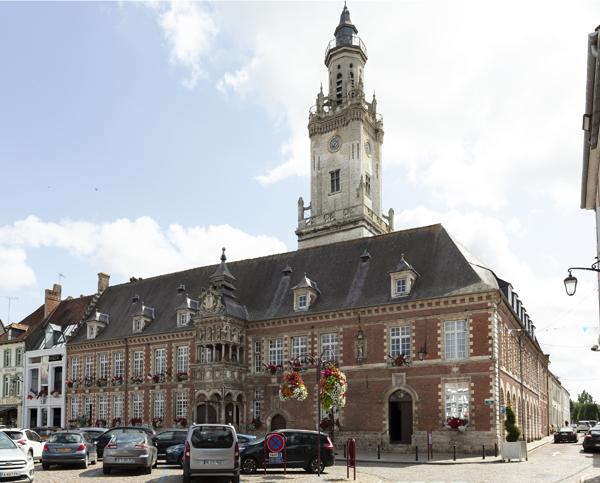
- The main frontage of the Hôtel de Ville in July 2023

General information
- Type: City hall
- Architectural style: Neoclassical style
- Location: Hesdin, France
- Coordinates: 50.3730°N 2.0365°E
- Completed: 1629

Height
- Height: 70 metres (230 ft)

Design and construction
- Architects: Dom Ponte del Brya

UNESCO World Heritage Site
- Part of: Belfries of Belgium and France
- Criteria: Cultural: ii, iv
- Reference: 943
- Inscription: 1999 (23rd Session)

Monument historique
- Official name: Hôtel de ville
- Type: Inscrit
- Designated: 1926
- Reference no.: PA00108312

The Hôtel de Ville (French pronunciation: [otɛl də vil], City Hall) is a municipal building in Hesdin, Pas-de-Calais, in northern France, standing on Place d'Armes. It was designated a monument historique by the French government in 1926.

== History ==
In 1553, the Holy Roman Emperor, Charles V ordered the destruction of the old fortified town of Hesdin and commissioned the present town, some 6 kilometres (3.7 mi) to the northwest from the original site, close to a house owned by his sister, Mary of Hungary, on the banks of the Canche. The governor of the new town, Antoine d'Helfaut, laid the foundation stone for the town hall (the right hand section of the current structure) on 23 July 1563. The new building was designed by Dom Ponte del Brya in the neoclassical style, built by Jehan de Hellin and Josse de Fontaine in red brick with stone finishings and was completed in around 1581. A tower was erected behind the town hall around the same time, and the town hall was extended to the southeast in 1629.

The design involved an asymmetrical main frontage of 15 bays facing onto Place d'Armes. The eighth bay on the left contained a carriage opening on the ground floor, while the ninth bay featured a full height bretèche with a date stone (displaying the year 1629) and statues depicting faith, hope and charity. The older section on the right incorporated two arched doorways with hood moulds and coats of arms. The coats of arms were of Charles V and of the Prince of Ligne. The other bays were generally fenestrated by cross-windows on the first two floors and by dormer windows at attic level.

In 1639, during the Thirty Years' War, French troops under the command of King Louis XIII laid siege to the town. The tower was destroyed by French artillery and, after the town had been secured for France, it was rebuilt in wood. By 1768 the tower was dilapidated and had to be demolished. A century later, with the benefit of a bequest by a local lawyer, Daniel Lereuil, the tower was rebuilt in stone based on a design by Clovis Normand and officially re-opened in 1878. The new tower, which was surmounted by machicolations and an octagonal belfry, was 70 metres (230 ft) high.

In 2005, the belfry was added to the UNESCO World Heritage List as part of the Belfries of Belgium and France site because of its architecture and historical importance in maintaining municipal power in Europe. A major programme of refurbishment works, costing €4.2 million, was initiated in the town in June 2025, with the restoration of the belfry forming the centrepiece of the programme.
