= Joan of Valois, Countess of Beaumont =

French princess

Joan of Valois
- Countess of Beaumont
- Born: 1304
- Died: 1363 (aged 58–59); Château Gaillard, Les Andelys, France
- Spouse: Robert III of Artois
- Issue: John of Artois, Count of Eu; Joan of Artois; James of Artois; Robert of Artois; Charles of Artois, Count of Pézenas
- House: Valois
- Father: Charles, Count of Valois
- Mother: Catherine I, Latin Empress

Joan of Valois (French: Jeanne de Valois; 1304–1363) was the daughter of Charles, Count of Valois and his second wife Catherine I of Courtenay, titular empress of Constantinople.

She was half-sister to King Philip VI of France. In around 1320, she married Robert III of Artois, later Count of Beaumont-le-Roger and seigneur of Conches. They had:

- John (1321–1387)
- Joan (1323–1324)
- James (c. 1325–1347)
- Robert (c. 1326–1347)
- Charles (1328–1385)

On several occasions, her husband Robert had attempted to claim the title of Count of Artois, which had been awarded to his aunt Mahaut of Artois by Philip IV of France and confirmed by his successors. Following a forgery scandal in 1329, Robert fled into exile, having forfeited his titles and honours. In 1331, Joan and her children were arrested by order of Philip and imprisoned at Château Gaillard, where she died in 1363.

== In fiction ==
Joan is a character in Les Rois maudits (The Accursed Kings), a series of French historical novels by Maurice Druon. She was portrayed by Françoise Giret in the 1972 French miniseries adaptation of the series, and by Toinette Laquière in the 2005 adaptation.

== Sources ==
- de Venette, Jean (1953). Newhall, Richard A. (ed.). The Chronicle of Jean de Venette. Translated by Birdsall, Jean. Columbia University Press.
- Warner, Kathryn (2019). Philippa of Hainault: Mother of the English Nation. Amberley.
