= John of Artois, Count of Eu =

French nobleman; count of Eu

John of Artois
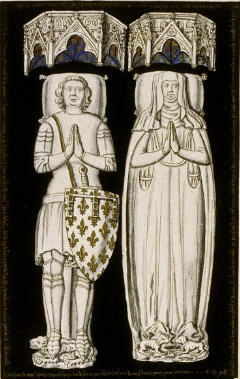
- John of Artois with his wife, Isabelle de Melun
- Born: 29 August 1321
- Died: 1387 (aged 65–66)
- Noble family: Artois
- Spouse: Isabeau of Melun (m. 1352)
- Issue: Joan, Countess of Dreux; John, Lord of Péronne; Robert IV of Artois, Count of Eu; Philip of Artois, Count of Eu; Charles of Artois; Isabeau of Artois
- Father: Robert III of Artois
- Mother: Jeanne of Valois

John of Artois (29 August 1321 – 1387), called "sans Terre" (Landless), was the son of Robert III of Artois and Joan of Valois. The confiscation of his father's lands, titles, and goods for attempted fraud in 1331 had left him without an inheritance.

In 1352, John was created Count of Eu by King John II of France, a title earlier forfeited at the execution of the previous holder, Raoul II of Brienne. He was badly wounded at the Battle of Poitiers on 19 September 1356 and was captured there by the English. Enormously rich, John's ransom was sold to Edward the Black Prince by his captor Élie de Pommiers for 30,000 gold écus.

John married Isabeau of Melun (1328–1389), daughter of John I of Melun, Count of Tancarville, on 11 July 1352 and had the following issue:

- Joan (1353 – 1420), married at the Château d'Eu on 12 July 1365 Simon de Thouars (d. 1365), Count of Dreux
- John (1355 – 1363), Lord of Peronne
- Robert (1356 – 1387), later Count of Eu
- Philip (1357 – 1397), later Count of Eu
- Charles (1359 – 15 April 1368)
- Isabeau (1361 – 26 June 1379)

John of Artois, Count of Eu House of Artois Cadet branch of the Capetian dynasty Born: 29 August 1321 Died: 1387
French nobility
Preceded by Raoul II	Count of Eu; 1352–1387	Succeeded by Robert
