= La Belle Hélène de Constantinople =

14th-century French chanson de geste

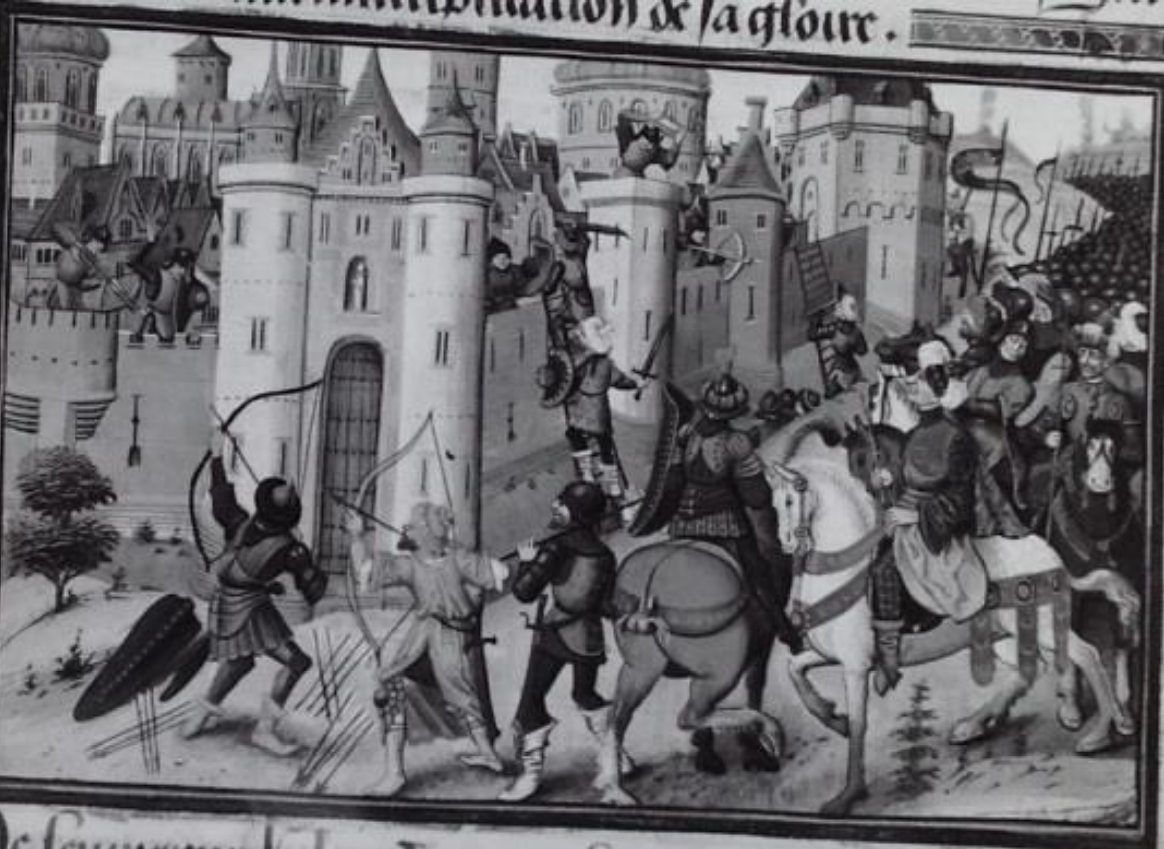
Siege of Rome, painted by Loyset Liédet, from MS 9967 of the Belle Hélène

La Belle Hélène de Constantinople (or L'Ystoire de Helayne) is a Middle French chanson de geste of the 14th century combining features of epic, romance and hagiography. It exists in both verse and prose versions.

== Manuscripts and versions ==
There are three manuscripts in verse and four in prose. The most extensive verse version, found in a manuscript of Arras, has almost 15,500 alexandrines divided into 399 laisses each with its own end rhyme.

In 1448, Jehan Wauquelin made a prosification for Duke Philip the Good. It survives in the manuscript Royal Library of Belgium MS 9967, illuminated with 26 miniatures by Loyset Liédet between 1460 and 1467. This copy was probably produced to invigorate the declining spirit of crusading.

== Synopsis ==
The main story of La Belle Hélène, although embellished by numerous subplots and action sequences, is of the same type as Chaucer's "Man of Law's Tale" and to the folk legend of the Handless Maiden. Although the author describes it as "histoire moult vraie" ('history most true'), it is in fact historical fiction with elements of fantasy.

The anachronistic story appears to be set in Middle Ages, although explicit references point to the reign of Pope Clement I (88–97), the life of Saint Martin of Tours (316–397) or the reign of King Clovis I (481–511). The title character is the daughter of King Antoine of Constantinople. Her mother is a niece of Pope Clement given to Antoine in reward for his bravery against the Saracens. She dies giving birth and her daughter is named after Helena of Constantinople. When she is thirteen years old, Antoine falls in love with her and asks Clement for a dispensation to marry her. The pope agrees only after an angel assures him the union will never be consummated. Antoine successfully defends Rome from the Saracens, but when he returns his daughter has fled to a monastery in Flanders.

When the Saracen king of Flanders falls in love with her, Hélène flees by ship but is captured by pirates. When the pirate captain tries to rape her, she prays to the Virgin Mary, who sends a storm that causes a shipwreck of which Hélène is the sole survivor. Stranded on the coast of England, she is found by King Henry, who marries her against his mother Marguerite's advice. When he goes off to defend Rome from the Turks, leaving his pregnant wife in the care of the earl of Gloucester, his mother tries through fraud to have Hélène and her newborn twin boys executed. The earl, however, only amputates her right arm. He then executes his own sister, Marie, whose death by fire was prophesied at her birth, in Hélène's place. She and her children are set adrift at sea in a rudderless boat.

Hélène and the boys land on the island of Constance (ever since called Scotland), where the children are taken by a wolf and a lion. Believing them dead, Hélène sails for France. The boys are rescued by a hermit named Felix, who names the one Lion and the other Brac, because he is holding his mother's arm (French bras). In Rome, the hundred-year-old pope and King Henry defeat the Turkish king Butor and Henry adopts his crest of three leopards as his own. It is the coat of arms of England down to the present.

Meanwhile, Antoine, still searching for his daughter, exorcises an evil spirit from Graibaut, king of Bavaria, who had fallen in love with his daughter, Clariande. Graibaut retires to a hermitage, leaving Bavaria to Clariande. Antoine goes to Flanders, where he repents of his incestuous desires. In England, he meets a distraught King Henry and the two realize they are in-laws. When the fraud perpetrated by Marguerite is revealed by Antoine's ruse, Henry has her burned to death. Gloucester then reveals that he burned his sister in place of Hélène. The two kings are joined by a third, Amaury of Scotland, exiled by his people on account of his conversion to Christianity.

When they reach the age of sixteen, Lion and Brac go searching for their mother. They come to the court of Clariande, who has recently married the earl of Gloucester, but they must flee when she falls in love with Lion. In France, they are baptised by an archbishop of Tours named Martin. Lion and Brac are christened Martin and Brice. Throughout, their good deeds to the poor are emphasised.

The three kings fight numerous battles in their search for Hélène. They capture Bordeaux, which becomes an English possession, and baptise its pagan king, Coustant, who joins them. They arrive at Tours, where Hélène goes into hiding, but they recognize her arm, which Brice still carries. Brice goes to England, but the four kings march to liberate Jerusalem from the pagans. Coustant is captured. Plaisance, the daughter of the king of Jerusalem, falls in love with him. When the two are found together, Coustant kills the king and is miraculous brought to the Christian camp by Saint George. A pregnant Plaisance flees to the protection of a Roman senator and is baptised. The senator falls in love with her, poisons his wife and tries to have her infant son murdered. A prophecy says that the two ladies (Plaisance and Hélène) will only be rescued when Jerusalem, Flanders and the city of Castres in Lombardy have been conquered.

Thieves spoil the murder of Plaisance and Coustant's son, who is left in a forest near Castres, which is being besieged by Clovis I of the Franks. When the senator makes advances on Plaisance he is paralyzed and she flees to the pagan king of Castres. The siege of Jerusalem ends when King Amaury manages to scale the tallest tower. The pagan king of Jerusalem now converts and becomes an ally. This is the centrepiece of the chanson.

Hélène is working as a washerwoman fending off the amorous advances of beggars when she decides to visit the pope. Plaisance has opened a hostel for pilgrims. When Hélène falls ill on her journey, she is nursed back to health by Plaisance. King Hurtaut of Castres falls in love with her, but she flees to Rome. There she meets the pope, her uncle, but keeps her identity concealed. When she learns that Henry is coming, she returns to Tours. Coustant goes in search of Plaisance and learns of the survival of his son.

The remaining kings take Acre and plan to assault Mecca when Clement recalls them to deal with Hurtaut. During the siege of Castres, Amaury is captured and crucified. After two months, the city falls. Plaisance and Coustant are reunited and Henry gives them the city as a wedding gift. It is renamed Piacenza after Plaisance.

The conquest of Flanders involves fighting dwarfs and giants. Henry is captured at Bruges and imprisoned in a snake pit. Antoine, Martin and Brice rescue him. Antoine, Brice and the archbishop of Tours are then captured at Hantonne in Scotland by Amaury's still pagan brother. They are freed by Amaury's secretly Christian sister Ludiane, who marries Brice and gives birth to the future Saint Brice.

At last the principal characters surround Tours and demand to know about the one-armed woman. Her neighbours hand her over and beg for mercy. After 32 years, she is reunited with her father. Her son Martin miraculously restores her arm. All go to Rome to see the aged Pope Clement. There Henry and Hélène die and are buried. Brice becomes king of England and Constantinople. Martin succeeds to the archbishopric of Tours and is succeeded in turn by his nephew, Saint Brice.

== See also ==
- Calumniated Wife

== Bibliography ==
- Black, Nancy B. (2001). "La Belle Hélène de Constantinople and Crusade Propaganda at the Court of Philip the Good". Fifteenth Century Studies. 26: 42–51.
- Jones-Wagner, Valentina Aimee (2001). "La Belle Hélène de Constantinople": The Text of the Female Body in a Fourteenth-Century Chanson de Geste (PhD dissertation). City University of New York. ProQuest 304690067
- McInerney, Maud B. (2012). "Fantasies of Failing Empire in La Belle Hélène de Constantinople". New Medieval Literatures. 14: 63–94. doi:10.1484/j.nml.1.103187.
