= Vieil-Hesdin =

- Commune
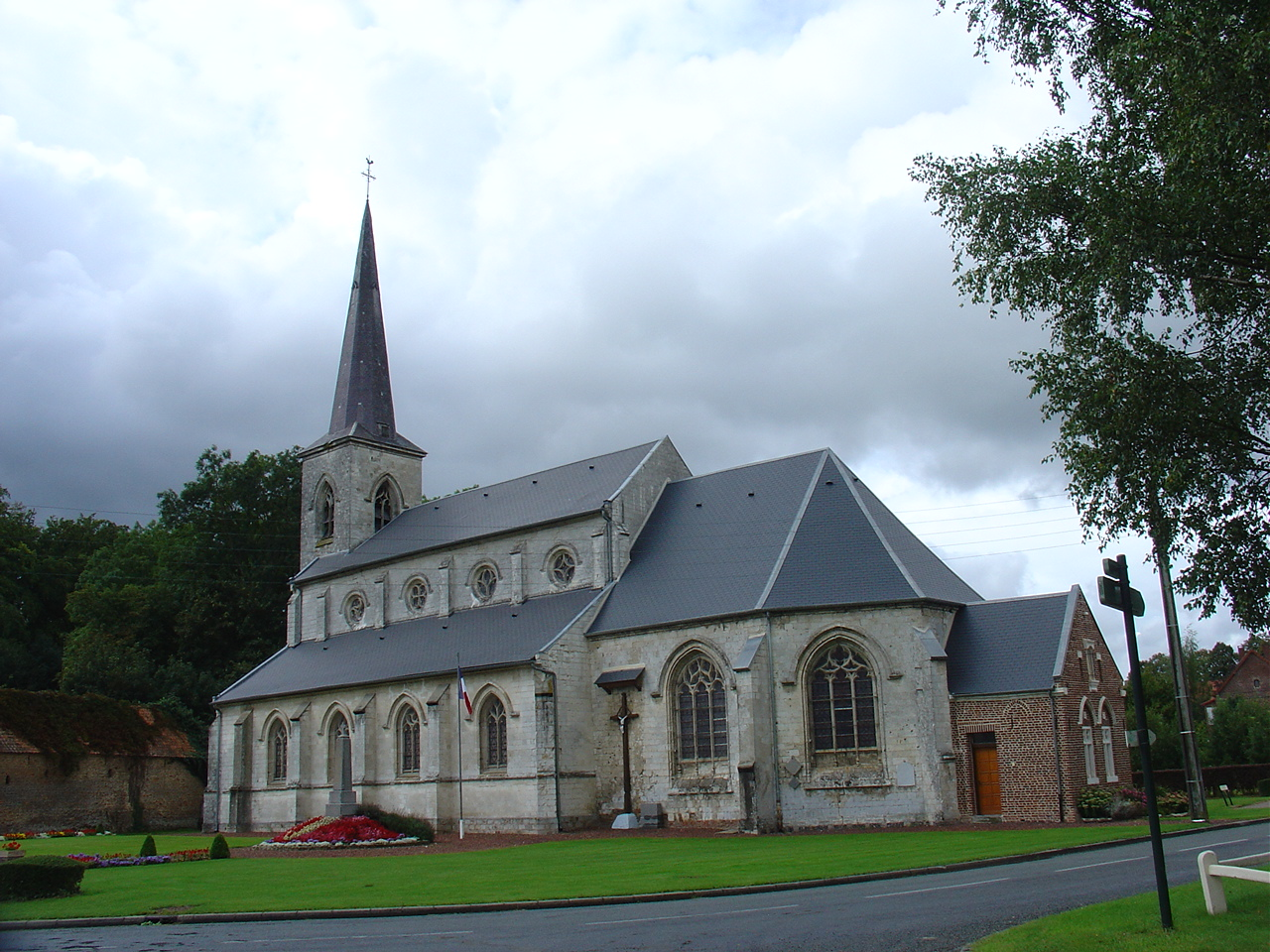
- The church of Vieil-Hesdin
- Location of Vieil-Hesdin
- Location within France Location within Hauts-de-France
- Coordinates: 50°21′30″N 2°05′59″E
- Country: France
- Region: Hauts-de-France
- Department: Pas-de-Calais
- Arrondissement: Montreuil
- Canton: Auxi-le-Château
- Intercommunality: CC des 7 Vallées

Government
  - Mayor (2020–2026): Christian Druelle
- Area^{1}: 9.82 km^{2} (3.79 sq mi)
- Elevation: 37 m (121 ft)
- Highest elevation: 125 m (410 ft)
- Lowest elevation: 31 m (102 ft)
- Population (2023): 351
  - Density: 35.7/km^{2} (92.6/sq mi)
- Time zone: UTC+01:00 (CET)
  - Summer (DST): UTC+02:00 (CEST)
- INSEE/Postal code: 62850 /62770
- ^{1} French Land Register data, which excludes lakes, ponds, glaciers > 1 km^{2} (0.386 sq mi or 247 acres) and river estuaries.

Vieil-Hesdin (French pronunciation: [vjɛj edɛ̃]) is a commune in the Pas-de-Calais department in the Hauts-de-France region of France.

== Geography ==
Vieil-Hesdin is situated 6 kilometres southeast of Hesdin, on the banks of the river Canche on the D 340 highway.

== History ==
Once just simply known as Hesdin, this little village was, in the Middle Ages, a large and prosperous town. Its position in the heart of the county of Artois, once part of the Spanish Netherlands, led to its downfall. From 1471 until its destruction in 1553, it suffered many sieges and sackings, as a result of fighting between the Kings of France, the Holy Roman Empire, Henry VIII of England and several French nobles.

The end of Hesdin, as it was then known, came at the hands of Charles V. His 60,000 strong army had already ravaged Metz and razed Thérouanne in April 1553 and he ordered the city and the castle completely destroyed. A month later, the wreckers had finished their work. Only the convent and chapel were spared. Some months later, the demolition material was used to found a new city 6 kilometres downstream, at a village then called Maisnil. This new town took the name Hesdin-fert, then Hesdin-fort, eventually becoming Hesdin. The ruined town was known for a while as Hesdin-le-Châtel, then eventually as Vieil-Hesdin (Old-Hesdin).

== Population ==
Historical population
Year	Pop.	±% p.a.
1968	338	—
1975	371	+1.34%
1982	362	−0.35%
1990	364	+0.07%
1999	364	+0.00%
2007	367	+0.10%
2012	375	+0.43%
2017	356	−1.03%
2023	351	−0.24%
Source: INSEE

== Places and monuments ==
- Château d'Estruval, 18th-19th century
- The former convent of the Black Nuns, now a château. The façade, roof and cloisters are protected by decree of July 9, 1981. The garden walls and buildings (including two pigeon houses) are also protected by decree of April 28, 1993.

== See also ==
- Communes of the Pas-de-Calais department
