= Jean Mansel =

Jean Mansel (born c. 1400–1401, died c. 1473–1474) was a functionary at the court of the Duchy of Burgundy and a historian.

== Biography ==
Jean Mansel was born in Hesdin, and entered the service of the Dukes of Burgundy, at whose court his father had also worked. Jean Mansel had several duties at the court, many of them connected with the collection of taxes in Hesdin. In 1470 he was responsible for the inspection of the castle in Hesdin. In August the same year he was relieved of his duties by Charles the Bold on account of his old age and frail state. He died a few years later.

Jean Mansel was also the author of two works on history, Fleur des histoires and Histoires romaines. The Fleur des histoires is a summary world history which exists in several versions and spans from Genesis to the death of Charles VI of France. Several copies of the Fleur des histoires were made as costly illuminated manuscripts, and the historical account it presents can be interpreted as a propagandistic attempt to glorify and strengthen the legitimacy of the Dukes of Burgundy.
