= Robert III of Artois =

French nobleman

- Count of Beaumont-le-Roger; Lord of Conches-en-Ouche, Domfront and Mehun-sur-Yèvre
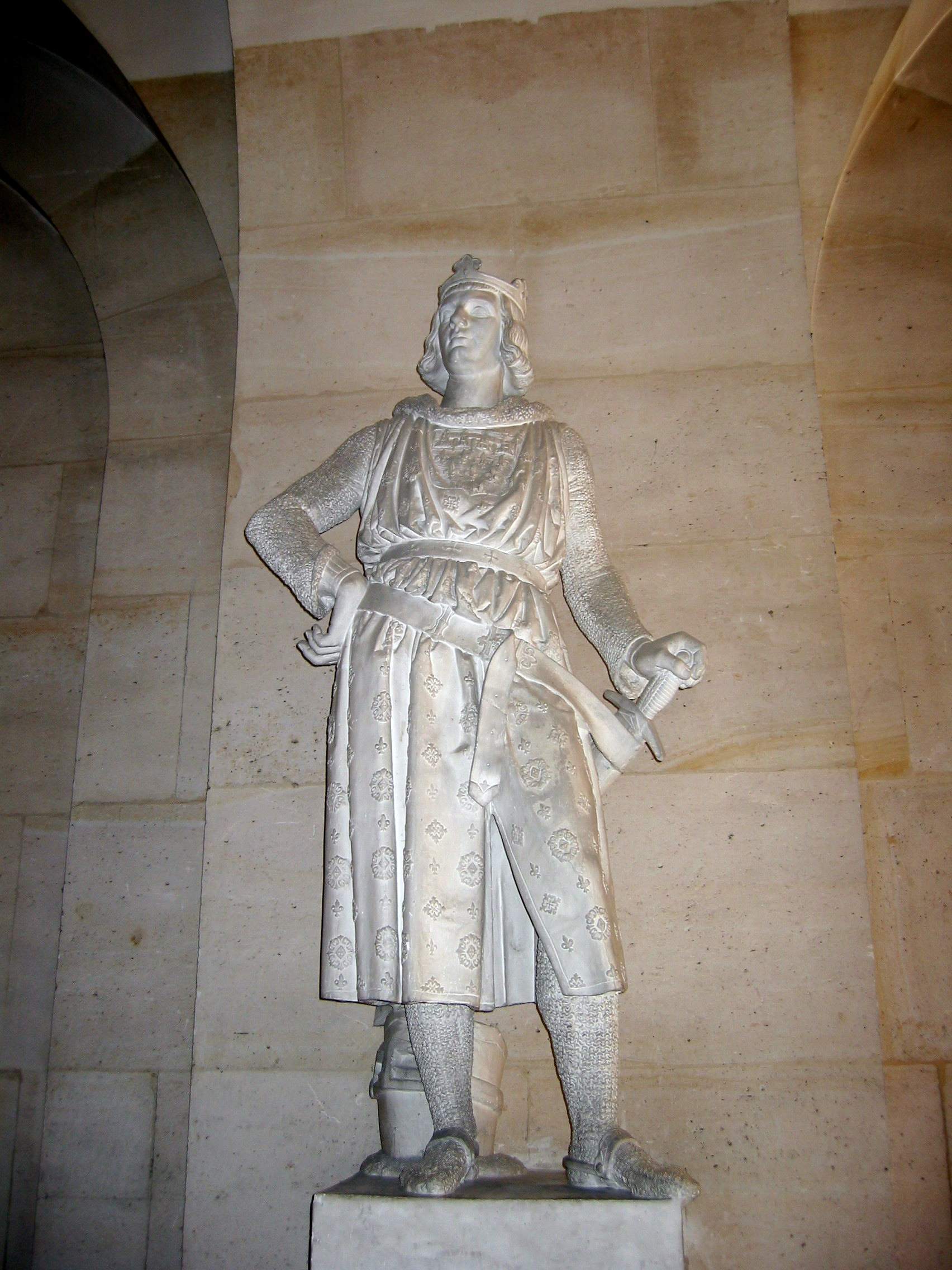
- Statue of Robert d'Artois in Versailles
- Born: 1287
- Died: 1342 (aged 54–55); London, England
- Noble family: Artois
- Spouse: Joan of Valois (m. 1320)
- Issue: John, Count of Eu; Charles, Count of Pezenas
- Father: Philip of Artois
- Mother: Blanche of Brittany

Robert III of Artois (1287 – between 6 October & 20 November 1342) was a French nobleman of the House of Artois. He was the Lord of Conches-en-Ouche, of Domfront, and of Mehun-sur-Yèvre, and in 1309 he received as appanage the county of Beaumont-le-Roger in restitution for the County of Artois, which he claimed. He was also briefly Earl of Richmond in 1341 after the death of John III of Brittany.

== Life ==
=== Early years ===
Arms of Charles III of Artois

Robert was the son of Philip of Artois, lord of Conches-en-Ouche, and Blanche, daughter of Duke John II of Brittany. His father died on 11 September 1298 from wounds received at the Battle of Furnes on 20 August 1297 against the Flemish. His father's early death was an indirect cause of the dispute over the succession to the County of Artois.

After the death of his grandfather Count Robert II of Artois, at the Battle of Courtrai in 1302, the young Robert's aunt, Mahaut, inherited the County of Artois by custom, as she was closer to Robert II. At the time, Robert was too young to challenge this succession, though he would do so later.

=== Influence ===
Robert played an important role in the succession to the throne of his brother-in-law Philip VI of France and was his trusted advisor for some time. It was through this influence that Philip granted him the County of Beaumont-le-Roger in June 1328 as compensation for Mahaut's inheritance of Artois. On Mahaut's death in 1329, the title to Artois passed to her daughter Countess Joan II of Burgundy. Following the example of the county of Flanders, Robert reopened the question of succession.

=== The fraudulent will ===
In 1331, Robert was found guilty of forging the will of his late father, using thirty-four perjured depositions and a fake document created by Jeanne de Divion, who was subsequently burned at the stake. After this deception was discovered, Robert lost any hope of acquiring Artois. Robert failed to respond to a fourth summons to appear before the king and was sentenced in absentia to exile and estate confiscation on 8 April 1332. To avoid arrest and execution, Robert fled France and took refuge with his nephew Marquis John II of Namur. His wife and sons, John and Charles, were imprisoned at Chateau Gaillard in Normandy in 1334. In pursuing Robert, Philip asked the Bishop of Liège to attack Namur. Robert then fled to his nephew-in-law, Duke John III of Brabant. Philip compelled the duke to abandon Robert, who fled across the English Channel to the court of Edward III of England.

=== Refuge in England and death ===
Robert met Edward III and, according to later legends, urged the English king to go to war to claim the kingdom of France. While in England, Robert became a member of Edward's royal council and provided the king with extensive information about the French court. Many contemporary chroniclers relate how Robert's influence led directly to the start of the Hundred Years' War, particularly because Philip VI cited Edward's unwillingness to expel Robert as the reason for confiscating the Duchy of Guyenne in May 1337.

Robert followed Edward on his campaigns in the early part of the war, including commanding the Anglo-Flemish army at the Battle of Saint-Omer in 1340. He succumbed to dysentery after being wounded during the retreat from the city of Vannes in November 1342, during the War of the Breton Succession. He was originally buried in Blackfriars Church in London, but his tomb is now in St Paul's Cathedral.

In the late 1340s, a poetic oath called the Voeux du héron (Vow of the Heron) circulated in France and England, depicting Edward's invasion of France as the fulfilment of a chivalric oath made to Robert to take the French throne as his dynastic right.

== Family ==
Around 1320 Robert married Joan, daughter of Charles of Valois and his second wife Catherine I of Courtenay. They had:

- Louis (1320–1326/29).
- John (1321–1387), Count of Eu.
- Joan (1323–1324).
- James (c. 1325–1347).
- Robert (c. 1326–1347).
- Charles (1328–1385), Count of Pezenas.

== In fiction ==
Robert III of Artois is a major character in Les Rois maudits (The Accursed Kings), a series of French historical novels by Maurice Druon in which many of these events are retold. He was played by Jean Piat in the 1972 French miniseries adaptation of the series, and by Philippe Torreton in the 2005 adaptation.

== See also ==
- List of works by James Pradier

== Sources ==
- Le Bel, Jehan (2011). The True Chronicles of Jean Le Bel, 1290-1360. Translated by Bryant, Nigel. The Boydell Press.
- Dunbabin, Jean (2011). The French in the Kingdom of Sicily, 1266–1305. Cambridge University Press.
- Field, Sean L. (2012). The Beguine, the Angel, and the Inquisitor: The Trials of Marguerite Porete and Guiard of Cressonessart. University of Notre Dame Press.
- de Lincy, Le Roux (1852). "Inventaires des Btens Meubles et Immeubles de la Comtesse Mahaut d'Artois Pilles par L'armee de son Neveu, en 1313". Bibliothèque de l'École des Chartes. Troisième Série (in French). 3. Librairie Droz: 53–79.
- Sample, Dana L. (2004). "The Deceived as Deceiver: False Testimony in the Case of Robert of Artois". In Crane, Mark; Raiswell, Richard; Reeves, Margaret (eds.). Shell Games: Studies in Scams, Frauds, and Deceits (1300-1650). Centre for Reformation and Renaissance Studies.
- Sumption, Jonathan (1990). The Hundred Years War: Trial by Battle. Vol. 1. Faber & Faber.
- de Venette, Jean (1953). Newhall, Richard A. (ed.). The Chronicle of Jean de Venette. Translated by Birdsall, Jean. Columbia University Press.
- Warner, Kathryn (2017). Isabella of France: The Rebel Queen. Amberley Publishing.
- Warner, Kathryn (2020). Philippa of Hainault: Mother of the English Nation. Amberley Publishing.155
- Wood, Charles T. (1966). The French Apanages and the Capetian Monarchy, 1223-1328. Harvard University Press.

Peerage of England
Preceded by John III of Brittany	Earl of Richmond; 1341–1342	Succeeded by John of Gaunt
