= Charles of Artois, Count of Pézenas =

Charles of Artois (1328–1385) was the son of Robert III of Artois and Jeanne of Valois.

Arms of Charles

He was made Count of Longueville in 1356, but he gave it up to Bertrand du Guesclin in 1364 and became Count of Pézenas.

In May 1360, he married Jeanne (d. March 1402), Lady of Baucay. They had one child:

- Louis (b. 1362), d. young

According to documents of Bureau de La Rivière, he had a bastard son of Béatrice de Roucy, from Counts of Roucy:

- Philippe (b. 1354-5), d. in Italy; One of the negotiators of the marriage of Valentina Visconti and Louis, Duke of Orléans, passed to Milan, and left descendants.

In 1375, he was a commander of a company of Gascons in Guyenne.

| Preceded by Philip | Count of Longueville; 1356–1364 | Succeeded by Bertrand |
| Preceded by — | Count of Pézenas; 1364–1385 | Succeeded by to royal domain |
