= Hesdin =

Commune in Pas-de-Calais, France

Hesdin Heusdin
- Part of Hesdin-la-Forêt
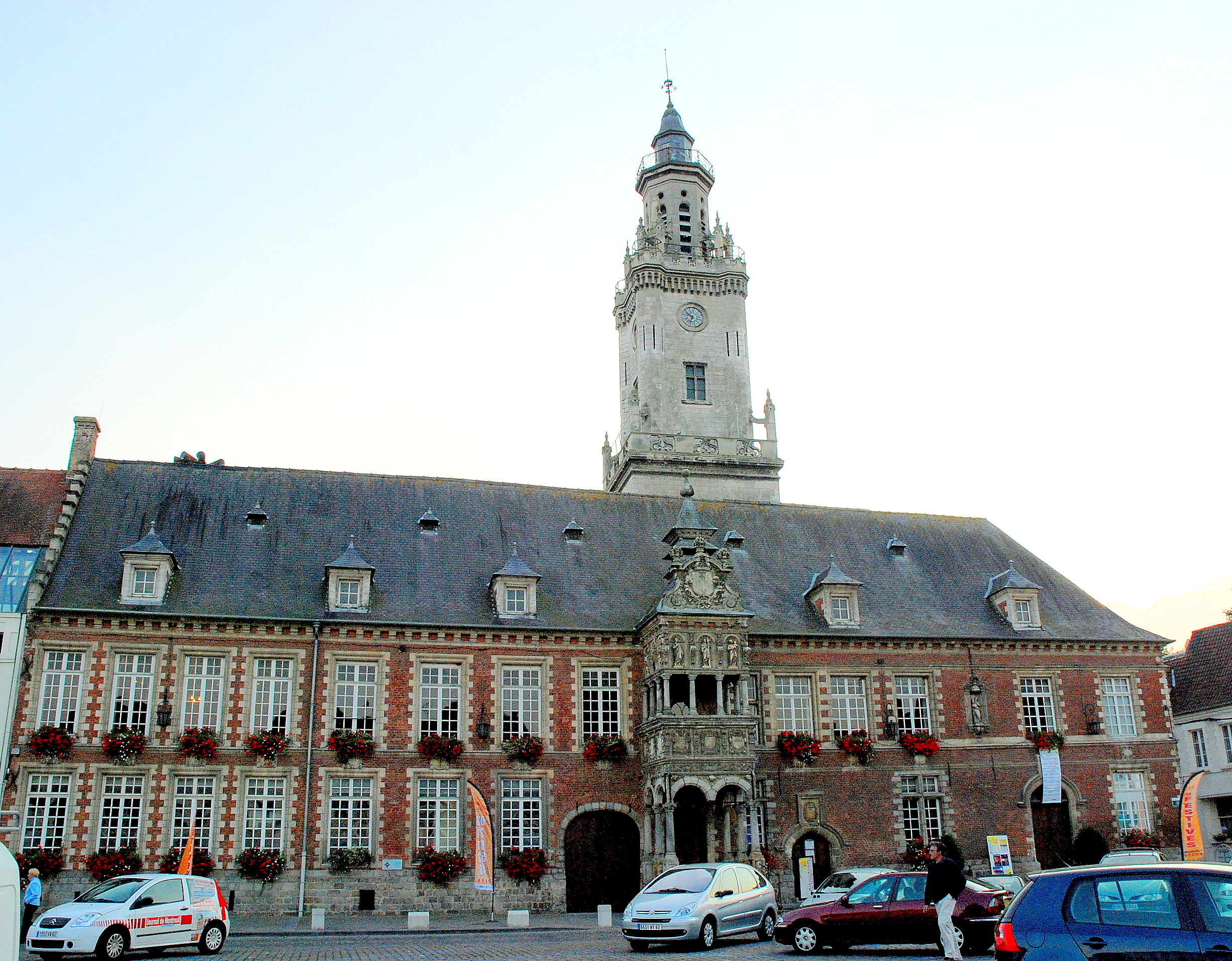
- The Hôtel de Ville

- Coat of arms
- Location of Hesdin
- Location within France Location within Hauts-de-France
- Coordinates: 50°22′25″N 2°02′17″E
- Country: France
- Region: Hauts-de-France
- Department: Pas-de-Calais
- Arrondissement: Montreuil
- Canton: Auxi-le-Château
- Commune: Hesdin-la-Forêt
- Area^{1}: 0.9 km^{2} (0.35 sq mi)
- Elevation: 26 m (85 ft)
- Highest elevation: 34 m (112 ft)
- Lowest elevation: 23 m (75 ft)
- Population (2022): 2,225
  - Density: 2,500/km^{2} (6,400/sq mi)
- Time zone: UTC+01:00 (CET)
  - Summer (DST): UTC+02:00 (CEST)
- Postal code: 62140
- Website: hesdin.fr
- ^{1} French Land Register data, which excludes lakes, ponds, glaciers > 1 km^{2} (0.386 sq mi or 247 acres) and river estuaries.

Hesdin (French pronunciation: [edɛ̃]; West Flemish: Heusdin) is a former commune in the Pas-de-Calais department in northern France. On 1 January 2025, it was merged into the new commune of Hesdin-la-Forêt.

== Geography ==
The N39, from Arras to Montreuil, used to be the main thoroughfare of the town. In the 1950s, a circular route was created to help traffic flow. A second bypass was built in the 1980s, taking all through traffic well away from the town centre.

The Canche river flows through the centre of Hesdin.

== History ==
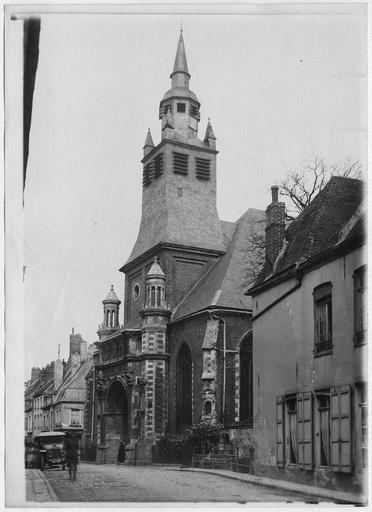
Church of Notre Dame in 1918

Hesdin was a fief of the counts of Artois, vassals of the Counts of Flanders until 1180. When Philip, count of Flanders gave Artois as dowry to his niece Isabella of Hainault when she married Philip Augustus of France in 1180, Hesdin and the other seigneuries passed to France.

At the end of the 11th century, Hesdin gained renown for the park and chateau of Robert II, Count of Artois, which featured the earliest examples of early medieval automata in Europe. These included mechanical monkeys covered in badger fur, mechanized fountains, a large sundial surrounded by lions and leopards, and a bellows-operated organ. Over the years additional automata were added, including creations such as a mechanical king and an indoor fountain with mechanical birds. Guillaume de Machaut, in his poem Le Remede de Fortune, characterized them as "the marvels, the delights, the inventions, the engines, the contrivances, the water courses, the strange things that were enclosed there." By the 1380s, the automata had fallen into disrepair, until Philip the Good renovated them again in the 1430s. A 1433 bill of account recounts numerous mechanical amusements, including machines that played pranks on the guests as well as angels and figures that spoke and directed visitors.

Though subsequently the territory passed to the Dukes of Burgundy, Hesdin remained one of a handful of French strongholds, until in 1553 Emperor Charles V ordered the utter destruction of the old fortified town on a rise of ground and built the present town the following year, some 6 kilometres (3.7 mi) from the original site, on the banks of the Canche. The unfortified village of Vieil-Hesdin was later built on the original site.

In 1639 the French laid siege to Hesdin and under Louis XIII, it was recaptured for France. Thus, though Hesdin has an ancient name and 16th century structures, there is nothing left of the medieval town.

During World War II, the town was occupied by Germany. The SS operated a subcamp of the V SS construction brigade, in which mostly Soviet and Polish prisoners were subjected to slave labour. In August 1944, due to Allied advance, the Germans dissolved the subcamp and deported its prisoners to subcamps of the Mittelbau-Dora concentration camp. In 1975, a memorial plaque and a small museum was established at the site of the subcamp.

In 2014 Hesdin elected a 22-year-old law student, Stéphane Sieczkowski-Samier, as Mayor. Sieczkowski-Samier became the youngest mayor in France and is nicknamed "Petit Sarko" (little Sarkozy) in the French press as a reference to the previous French President Nicolas Sarkozy who is from the same political party.

== Population ==
Historical population
Year	Pop.	±% p.a.
1968	3,105	—
1975	3,248	+0.65%
1982	2,977	−1.24%
1990	2,713	−1.15%
1999	2,686	−0.11%
2007	2,409	−1.35%
2012	2,178	−2.00%
2017	2,225	+0.43%
Source: INSEE

== Places of interest ==
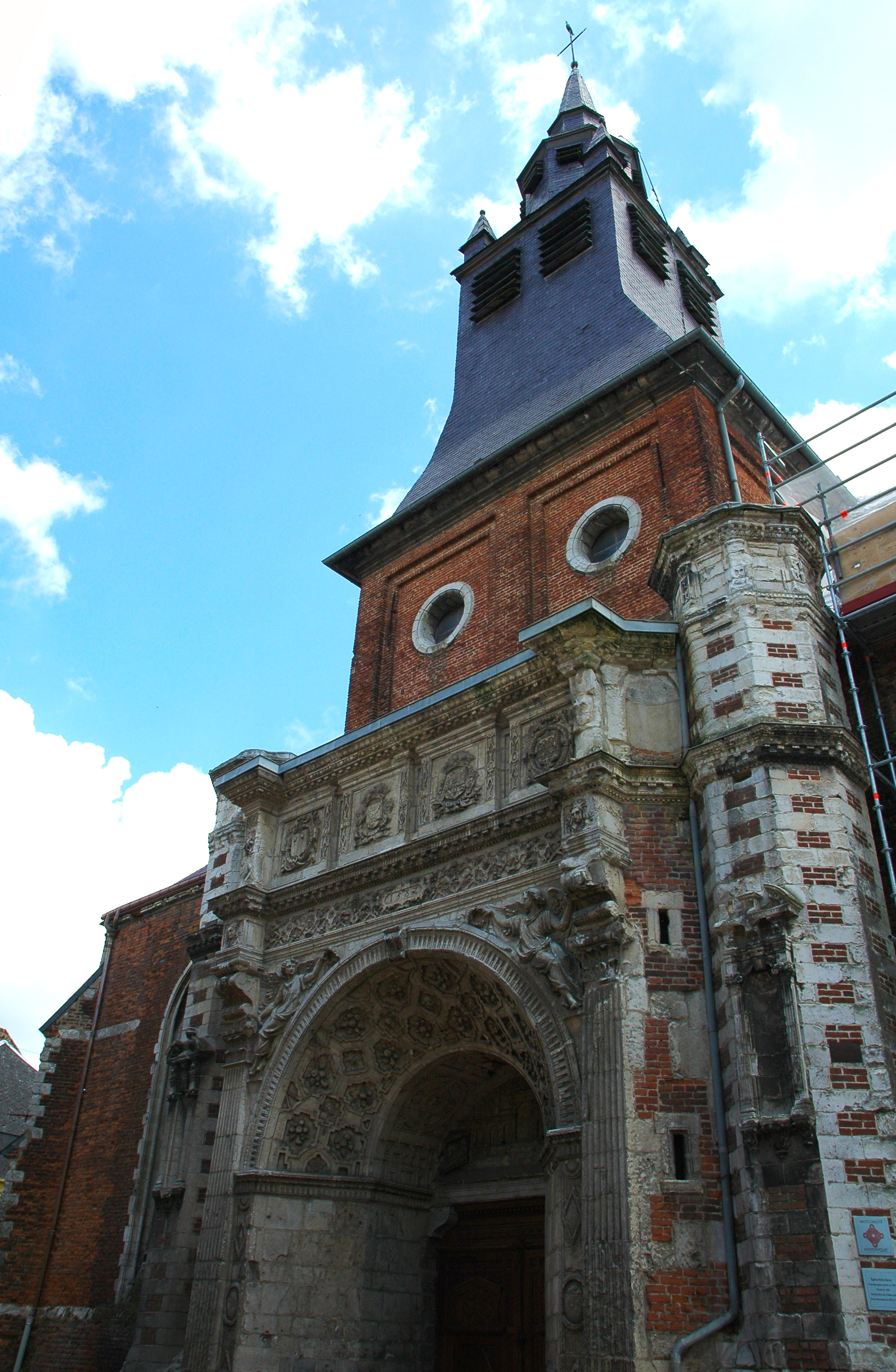
Church of Notre Dame

Hesdin is dominated by the central square, the Place d'Armes overlooked by the Hôtel de Ville completed in 1629. The Hôtel de Ville, with its large belfry, was inscribed on the UNESCO World Heritage List in 2005 as part of the Belfries of Belgium and France site, because of its historical importance as the center of municipal power within the region.

The contemporary Church of Notre Dame was begun in 1565 and completed in 1685.

== Notable people ==
- Ernulf de Hesdin (died 1097–8), important Domesday landholder and participant in the First Crusade.
- Jacquemart de Hesdin (c. 1355 – c. 1414), miniaturist and painter to the duc de Berry
- Jean Mansel (c. 1400–1474), historian and official at the court of the Dukes of Burgundy
- Loyset Liédet (c. 1420 – 1479), Netherlandish miniaturist and illuminator.
- The Abbé Prévost, (April 1, 1697 – 1763), celebrated novelist known worldwide for his Manon Lescaut, was born in Hesdin.
- Charles Blondin (1824–1897)
- François Dalle
- Jean-Louis Cottigny

== Events ==
Thursday is market day in Hesdin, when a large range of local produce and more typical inexpensive market items can be purchased from the stalls in the surrounding streets.

In the first two weeks of August the town has the fete of the Cochon Rose (Pink Piglet) which includes a variety of events including a Sunday Brocante (flea market) which is the biggest in the region.

== Twinned with ==
- London Borough of Havering in London, England
- Heusden-Zolder, Belgium

== See also ==
- Communes of the Pas-de-Calais department
