= Alexian nuns =

Catholic religious order

The Alexian nuns, also called Black Sisters (Dutch: Zwarte Zusters, French: Sœurs Noires) or Cellitines, are a Catholic religious order for women founded in the early 15th century and affiliated with the Alexian Brothers. They devoted themselves to the same corporal works of mercy as the Brothers. They wear a black habit and mantle with a white cap, whence their common name of "black sisters". Their motherhouse is in Cologne.

In January 1459, Pope Pius II permitted the sisters to take the three monastic vows of poverty, chastity, and obedience and to adopt a rule. Different houses adopted different rules. Most appear to have adopted the Rule of Saint Augustine, but some in Flanders adopted the Third Rule of Saint Francis. The Alexian sisters were especially notable for the work during outbreaks of plague. They remained laywomen, since they did not pray the hours.

== Houses ==
- Convent of the Black Sisters of Amersfoort
- Convent of the Black Sisters of Amsterdam
- Convent of the Black Sisters of Bourbourg
- Convent of the Black Sisters of Brussels
- Convent of the Black Sisters of Louvain

Alexian nunneries are also attested at Bergen op Zoom, Bois-le-Duc, Breda, Brielle, Dordrecht, Goes, Kampen, Middelburg, Oudewater, Reimerswaal, Roermond, Rotterdam, Weert and Zierikzee.
