= Theobald II =

Theobald II may refer to:

- Theobald II of Blois (c. 985 – 1004)
- Theobald II of Champagne (1090–1152)
- Theobald II of Navarre (1253–1271)
- Theobald II, Count of Bar (1221–1291)
- Theobald II, Duke of Lorraine (1263–1312)
