= Theobald of Bar =

Theobald of Bar (French: Thibaut de Bar) may refer to:

- Theobald I, Count of Bar (died 1214)
- Theobald II, Count of Bar (1221–1291)
- Theobald (bishop of Liège) (died 1312), son of Theobald II
- Theobald of Bar, Seigneur de Pierrepont (14th century)
