= Flanders War =

Flanders War may refer to:

- War of the Succession of Flanders and Hainault (1240s)
- Battle of the Golden Spurs (1302)
- Dutch Revolt (1568–1648)
