= Margaret II =

Margaret II may refer to:

- Margaret II of Flanders (1202–1280), Countess of Flanders and Hainaut, aka Margaret of Constantinople
- Margaret II of Hainaut (1311–1356), Countess of Hainaut and countess of Holland
- Margaret II, Countess Palatine of Burgundy (1350–1405), Countess of Flanders & Artois; Countess Palatine of Burgundy; Duchess of Burgundy
- Margrethe II (born 1940), Queen-regnant of Denmark (1972-2024)
