= Jean Brisebarre =

Opening illustration of the Restor du paon in Bodley 164 by Jehan de Grise

Jean Brisebarre (fl. 1305–1327), sometimes called Jean le Court, was an Old French poet. His most famous work, Li Restor du paon (The Restoration of the Peacock), is a continuation of the Vœux du paon, itself a continuation of the Roman d'Alexandre. Li Restor itself is continued in the Parfait du paon.

His surviving works are four long poems, four short poems and two lines from a fifth short poem. One lost work of his is known, some rhyming inscriptions.

== Life ==
Brisebarre (also spelled Brisebare) may be a nickname and not a family name. Although sometimes called Je(h)an le Court, this is probably a misreading of a note in a manuscript. He wrote in the Picard dialect.

Brisebarre was hired by Queen Joan to compose verses for the sculpted donor portraits of the new chapel of the Hôpital Saint-Jacques aux pèlerins in Paris. He was paid for this work on 18 February 1319. The sculpted portraits of the Saint James, the queen and others were lost in 1808 along with their inscriptions.

The 15th-century Règles de la seconde rhétorique, calls him Brisebarre de Douay and a contemporary of Guillaume Machaut, who was active after 1324. The Règles also claims that "he was not a cleric, neither did he know how to read or write." If the first claim is that he was not a clergyman, it is plausible, but that he was illiterate is unlikely. Across his works, Brisebarre shows deep knowledge of the Bible, a "penchant for debate" and good understanding of children (perhaps indicating his role as a tutor).

Brisebarre was dead by 1340, when Jean de Le Mote's Parfait du paon was written.

== Works ==
Decorated initial at the start of the Restor in the Pierpont Morgan manuscript

Brisebarre's surviving long works are:

- L'Escolle de Foy (1327)
- Le Tresor Nostre Dame
- Le Dit de l'Evesque et de Droit (after 1312)
- Li Restor du Paon (completed by 1338, the date of the earliest manuscript)

=== Lyric poems ===
Three short poems in the manuscript Charleville 100, copied in 1357, are attributed to Brisebarre and dated to "the year 5", which probably means 1305. They are in the trouvère tradition, in honour of the Virgin Mary. They are:

- De ly amer ne puest nulz amenrir
- Ma dame me tient en joie
- Onques n'amai tant Elainne

A fourth poem in honour of the Virgin, Serventois de Nostre Dame, is found in the manuscript Français 1543 of the Bibliothèque nationale de France in Paris. In addition, the first two lines of another short poem, a serventois, are quoted in the Règles de la seconde rhétorique:

S'Amours n'estoit plus poissant que Nature
No foy seroit legiere a condempner

=== L'Escolle de Foy ===
L'Escolle or L'Escole de Foy (The School of Faith) is a pious pedagogical–apologetic work structured as a series of arguments and counterarguments. It is a long poem of 262 octosyllabic douzains (that is, 3,144 lines) with the rhyme scheme aabaabbbabba. It is the only one of Brisebarre's works that can be dated precisely. It is preserved in the manuscript Français 576 of the Bibliothèque nationale de France, alongside Le Tresor Nostre Dame. These two works are the only ones of Brisebarre's works named by title in the Règles de la seconde rhétorique.

L'Escolle is addressed to Jews, whom Brisebarre sees as blind to the truth of the Old Testament. It offers a typological interpretation of the Jewish scriptures to prove the truth of Christianity.

=== Le Tresor Nostre Dame ===
Le Tresor Nostre Dame (The Treasure of Our Lady) is preserved in the manuscript Français 576 of the Bibliothèque nationale de France, alongside L'Escolle de Foy. It is only a third as long at 87 stanzas, but is in the same octosyllabic douzain form with the rhyme scheme aabaabbbabba.

The Tresor is a poetic account of the life of Jesus from the Annunciation to the Crucifixion. It was written in praise of the Virgin Mary. Its main sources are the four canonical gospels, although it also draws on prophetic Old Testament passages.

=== Le Dit de l'Evesque et de Droit ===
Le Dit or Li Plais de l'Evesque et de Droit (The Plea of the Bishop and the Law) is an allegorical satire of the morals of the clergy written the form of a dream in octosyllabic rhymed couplets. It is 3,740 lines long and is preserved in two manuscripts: Nouvelles acquisitions françaises 10056 of the Bibliothèque nationale and Ancien fonds 261 of the Royal Danish Library in Copenhagen. In the Paris manuscript, the work is anonymous, perhaps to protect its author's reputation. A reference to the trial of the Templars places the work later than 1312.

In the poem, the Law, symbolizing virtue, brings the bishop, symbolizing vice, before a court in Rome. In the end, the narrator reveals the trial to have been a dream. At one point, mocking Scholastic logic, the virute of thieves is proved by a series of syllogisms, for they provide social value: the magistrates get rich off the proceeds of justice while the clergy benefit from the donations the thieves make to escape damnation.

=== Li Restor du Paon ===
Musical notation for the Restor's rondeau in Bodley 264

The Restor du Paon presents itself as filling in a gap in the Vœux du paon. After Alexander the Great relieves the siege of Epheson, the Vœux describes three marriages. The Restor adds a further two. Where the Vœux describes nine knights and three ladies making vows over the body of a peacock, the Restor claims that one vow, Edea's vow to restore the peacock in gold, was omitted. It also decibres the early life of Emenidus and a debate on the twelve vows. The work ends as the Vœux ends, with Alexander departing for Bablyon. In the manuscript Bodley 264, the final rondeau of the Restor is accompanied by musical notation.

There are 17 manuscripts containing Li Restor du Paon in whole or in part:

- Copenhagen, Royal Library, Bibl. Thott. 414
- London, British Library, Add. 16888
- New York, Pierpont Morgan Library, Glazier G.24
- Oxford, Bodleian Library, Bodley 264
- Oxford, Bodleian Library, Douce 165
- Paris, Bibliothèque de l'Arsenal, Arsenal 2776
- Paris, Bibliothèque nationale de France, Français 12565
- Paris, Bibliothèque nationale de France, Français 12567
- Paris, Bibliothèque nationale de France, Français 1375
- Paris, Bibliothèque nationale de France, Français 1554
- Paris, Bibliothèque nationale de France, Français 20045
- Paris, Bibliothèque nationale de France, Français 2165–2166
- Paris, Bibliothèque nationale de France, Français 24386
- Paris, Bibliothèque nationale de France, Français 25521
- Paris, Bibliothèque nationale de France, Français 790
- Rouen, Bibliothèque patrimoniale Villon, O. 8

== Bibliography ==
- Blumenfeld-Kosinski, Renate (1986). "The Poetics of Continuation in the Old French Paon Cycle". Romance Philology. 39 (4): 437–447.
- Carey, Richard J., ed. (1966). Jean le Court dit Brisebare: Le Restor du Paon. Librairie Droz.
- Cruse, Mark (2011). Illuminating the Roman D'Alexandre: Oxford, Bodleian Library, MS Bodley 264 — The Manuscript as Monument. D. S. Brewer.
- Donkin, Enid, ed. (1980). Jean Brisebarre: 'Li Restor du Paon'. Modern Humanities Research Association.
- Kjær, Jonna (1975). "Présentation d'un texte inédit du XIV^{e} siècle: Li Plais de l'Evesque et de Droit". Revue Romane. 10 (2): 328–342.
- Linker, Robert White (1979). A Bibliography of Old French Lyrics. Romance Monographs.
