= Jacques de Longuyon =

Final laisse of the Vows, in which Jacques identifies himself and his patron

Jacques de Longuyon (Old French Jaques de Langhion or Longuion) was the author of the Vows of the Peacock, a chanson de geste written for Thibaut de Bar, bishop of Liège, about 1310. It was one of the most popular romances of the 14th century and introduces the concept of the Nine Worthies.

What is known of Jacques's origins comes from his own words in the final laisse of the Vows. He states that he was from Lorraine, although his name indicates the village of Longuyon, which was technically part of the Barrois mouvant. The final laisse was added to an already completed poem, since it deplores the death of Bishop Thibaut on 29 May 1312 and of Emperor Henry VII on 24 August 1313, by which time the poem was already in circulation.

Jacques is praised as the poet of the Vows in the Parfait de Paon, written around 1340 by Jean de Le Mote, who laments that the poem was "without conclusion" (presumably meaning that Jacques never composed a sequel). Jacques, called Jaiquet de Longuion, is also named as the judge of a jeu parti by Jehan de Chison.

There is no definite record of Jacques de Longuyon in contemporary documents. He may be the Jacomet or Jacoumet de Longuion, provost of Étalle, mentioned in a document dated 28 January 1293. The same person is recorded as provost of Longuyon in April 1294.

== Literature ==
- Edward Billings Ham, Three Neglected Manuscripts of the Voeux du Paon, Modern Language Notes (1931).
