= Matthias II of Lorraine =

Duke of Lorraine from 1220 to 1251

Matthias II
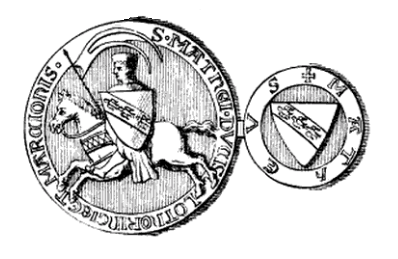
- S[IGILLUM] MATHEI DUCIS LOTHORINGIE ET MARCIONIS

Duke of Lorraine
- Reign: 1220 - 9 February 1251
- Predecessor: Theobald I
- Successor: Frederick III
- Born: c. 1193
- Died: 9 February 1251
- Spouse: Catherine of Limburg
- Issue: Frederick III, Duke of Lorraine; Laure; Isabella; Catherine; Adeline
- House: House of Lorraine
- Father: Frederick II, Duke of Lorraine
- Mother: Agnes of Bar

Matthias II (c. 1193 – 9 February 1251) was Duke of Lorraine from 1220 to his death. He was the son of Duke Frederick II and Agnes of Bar and succeeded his brother, Theobald I.

He immediately had to give away Nancy to his brother's widow, Gertrude of Dagsburg, who remarried to Theobald IV of Champagne, whose suzerainty Matthias had to recognize, due to the fruitless wars his brother had waged against an imperial coalition. Theobald had hoped to get his hands on the county of Metz, but failing that, he repudiated Gertrude. Gertrude had no children by a third marriage and Nancy reverted to the duchy on her death in 1225.

Matthias accompanied Emperor Frederick II on the Sixth Crusade in 1228 and into Italy in 1235. By this, he reinitiated the close alliance with the Holy Roman Emperors which his forefathers had had for over a century from the appointment of Adalbert until the war between his brother and Frederick, which had ruptured that long friendship.

Matthias faced several unruly barons, especially the Count of Lunéville, who had the discreet support of the Count of Bar. He was victorious and reattached Lunéville to the duchy in an exchange. However, peace was not achieved. In 1230, Henry II of Bar was at it again, with Hugh II of Vaudémont and the Bishop of Toul, ravaged his ducal territories and took a few castles.

In 1235, allied with Emperor Frederick II, Duke Matthias helped suppress the revolt of the emperor's son Henry VII and in May 1240 was a signatory of a letter to Pope Gregory IX's excommunication of the emperor, although he later swore in 1247 to help Pope Innocent IV against the emperor.

On Henry of Bar's death in 1240, Matthias tried to retake those lost castles from Theobald II of Bar, the old count's young son, but he failed and a peace was signed in 1245 which lasted several decades. That same year, the emperor was excommunicated for a third time and Matthias distanced himself from the Imperial camp before joining the papal party of Pope Innocent IV in 1247. He died only a few years thence after having negotiated the profitable marriage of his son with the daughter of the Count of Champagne.

== Family ==
In 1225, he married Catherine of Limburg (died 1255), daughter of Waleran III of Limburg, Duke of Limburg and Count of Luxembourg, and Ermesinde of Luxembourg. They had the following issue:

- Ferry III (1240–1303), his successor in Lorraine
- Laure, married in 1250 to Jean de Dampierre (died 1258), viscount of Troyes, and then to Guillaume de Vergy, lord of Mirebeau and Autrey
- Isabella (1231–1266), married Guillaume de Vienne (died 1255), then, in 1256, Jean de Chalon (1243–1309)
- Catherine, married in 1255 to Richard de Montfaucon (died 1279), son of Thierry III, Count of Montbéliard
- Adeline (died c. 1278), married Louis of Savoy (died 1302), baron of Vaud

== See also ==
- Dukes of Lorraine family tree

Preceded by Theobald I	Duke of Lorraine; 1220–1251	Succeeded by Frederick III
