= Catherine of Limburg =

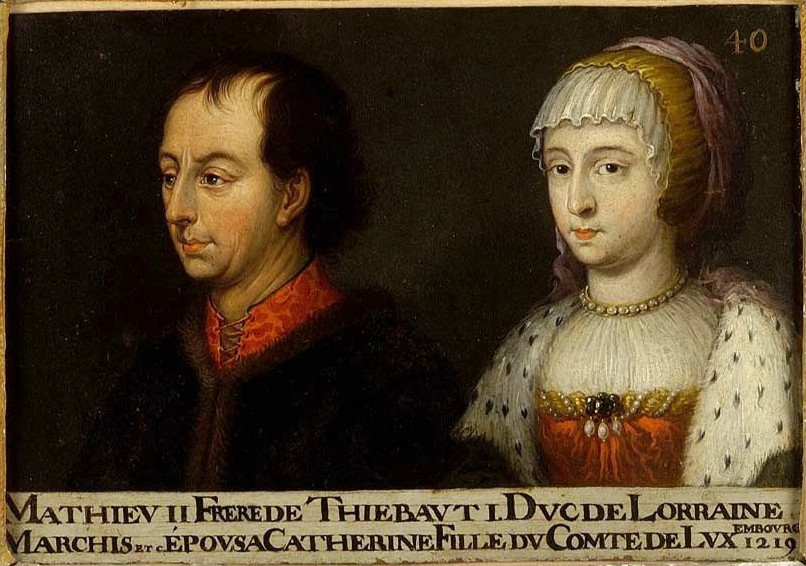
Portrait of Mathew II (left) and Catherine of Limbourg (right)

Catherine of Limburg (c. 1215–1255) was a duchess consort of Lorraine by marriage to Matthias II, Duke of Lorraine. She was regent of Lorraine during the minority of her son Frederick III, Duke of Lorraine between 1251 and 1255.

She was the daughter of Waleran III of Limburg, Duke of Limburg and Count of Luxembourg, and Ermesinde of Luxembourg.

== Issue ==
She had the following issue:

- Frederick (1240–1302), his successor in Lorraine
- Laure, married in 1250 to Jean de Dampierre (died 1258), viscount of Troyes, and then to Guillaume de Vergy, lord of Mirebeau and Autrey
- Isabella (died 1266), married Guillaume de Vienne (died 1255), then, in 1256, Jean de Chalon (1243–1309)
- Catherine, married in 1255 to Richard de Montfaucon (died 1279), son of Thierry III, Count of Montbéliard
- Adeline (died c. 1278), married Louis of Savoy (died 1302), baron of Vaud
