= Vows of the Peacock =

1312 poem by Jacques de Longuyon

Vows of the Peacock (French: Voeux du Paon) is a poem composed by Jacques de Longuyon between 1312 and 1313 for the Bishop of Liège, Thiébaut de Bar. The poem describes courtly activities and amusements during truces in a battle. Alternating between intense battle sequences and an idealised court setting, the poem emphasises notions of chivalry and valiance. The narrative culminates in a banquet where the gathered knights and ladies take turns swearing on an elaborately prepared peacock. Voeux was created as a later self-contained addition to the Roman d'Alexandre and achieved significant contemporary success. Through numerous illuminated manuscripts, and then later printed books, the story became well known. Longuyon’s grouping of the 'Nine Worthies’ in this text became a defining topos of the late Middle Ages.

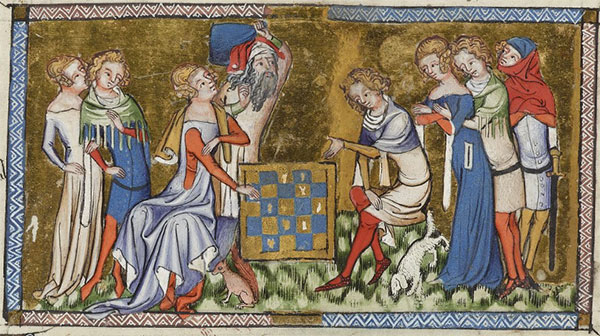
Jacques de Longuyon, Vows of the Peacock. detail from MS G.24, fols. 25v. ca. 1345–50. The Morgan Library & Museum, New York.

== Date ==
In the final laisse of the Vows, the poet identifies himself and his patron. This laisse, however, is found in only one manuscript in Bibliothèque nationale de France, MS Fr. 12565. Jacques de Longuyon is undoubtedly the author, but it is an addition to the poem. It was written after Thibaut had died in Rome on 29 May 1312 and the Emperor Henry VII had died on 24 August 1313. The first external reference to the poem is from a record of sale dated 9 September 1313, recording how the Parisian bookseller Thomas de Maubeuge sold a copy of the Vows to Mahaut of Artois.

== Plot ==
The nearly 8,600-line poem is composed of two distinct parts. The first begins with Alexander the Great encountering Cassamus on his journey to Babylon. Alexander resolves to help Cassamus defend city of Epheson from Clarus (the evil king of Ind) who seeks to kill Cassamus’ nephew Gadifer and marry his niece Fesona against her will. This section introduces key characters and the siege, situating it within the Alexander’s legend and contextualising the events of the rest of the poem. This first part has been interpreted as a prelude, in part because the second part opens with a description of spring – a common way to begin narratives:

‘‘When May begins and winter wanes, and the gay birds sing in their latin, the woods and fields turn green again. It was in this season, Lord, on a Monday morning, that Clarus besieged the army of Gadifer. War was waged and the blood which flowed from bodies and arms and heads covered the bodies of the slain and wounded that filled the ditches.’’ (translated from Voeux by Dominic Leo)

In the second part, the battle ensues, several truces are struck, and the characters engage in courtly games like chess and the “soothsayer king.” Porrus, son of Clarus, and The Baudrian are captured during a battle and brought to the ‘chamber of Venus.’ While wandering the castle grounds, Porrus kills a peacock which, unbeknownst to him, belonged to Fesonas. At the subsequent banquet the peacock is cooked, and Alexander’s knights, ladies and the two prisoners all make vows on the bird. The rest of the poem sees these vows carried out, except for Edea’s which forms the later text Le Restor du Paon. Concluding with a series of marriages (Porrus and Fesonas; Betis and Ydorus; the Baudrain and Edea; Elyot and Marcien; and Gadifer and Lydoine), Longuyon underscores themes of romance and flirtation.

=== The Vows ===
John Grigsby suggests that the vow section can be extracted from the rest of the text and examines the implications and structure of each of the vows. Grigsby identifies three types of vows: the expected ones, the female wishes and the confrontational vows. Gadifer’s vow to bring down Claus’s battle standard and Perdicas’s vow to dismount in battle and fight with the foot soldiers both focus on battle achievements and participate in the competitive but genial atmosphere. In contrast, Fesona’s vow to marry a suitor of Alexander’s choosing and Ydorus’s to be faithful to her lover are concerned with marriage and romance. The Baudrian’s vow – to take Alexander’s sword during the battle – is an example of a confrontational vow, serving to unsettle the banquet’s harmony. The vowing ceremony ends with the peacock parade and selection of the knight with the worthiest vow, which is decided to be Aristé who swore to defend Fesonas at any cost. Grigsby highlights the ‘hypercourteous’, almost ridiculous, nature of Cassamus’s vow to put Claus back on his horse if he fell during battle, as it directly contradicts his own aims and even his familial loyalties. Grigsby argues the arrangement and order of these vows reflects hierarchy, romantic pairing at the table and interruptions across it.

(Chart adapted from John L. Grigsby)
Person Vowing	Content of the Vow
1- Cassamus	To aid Clarus
2- Aristé	To defend Fesonas
3- Perdicas	To fight on foot
4- Fesonas	To accept Alexander as matchmaker
5- Porrus	To steal Emednidus's horse
6. Edea	To restore the peacock
7- The Baudrain	To seize Alexander's sword
8- Caulus	To tear off the Baudrian's helmet and recover sword
9- Ydorus	To be a faithful lover
10- Lyone	To joust with Clarus's eldest son
11- Floridas	To avenge the Baudrain's seizure of Alexander's sword
12- Gadifer	To topple Clarus's battle standard

== Literary contexts ==
=== The Knightly Bird Vow Cycle ===
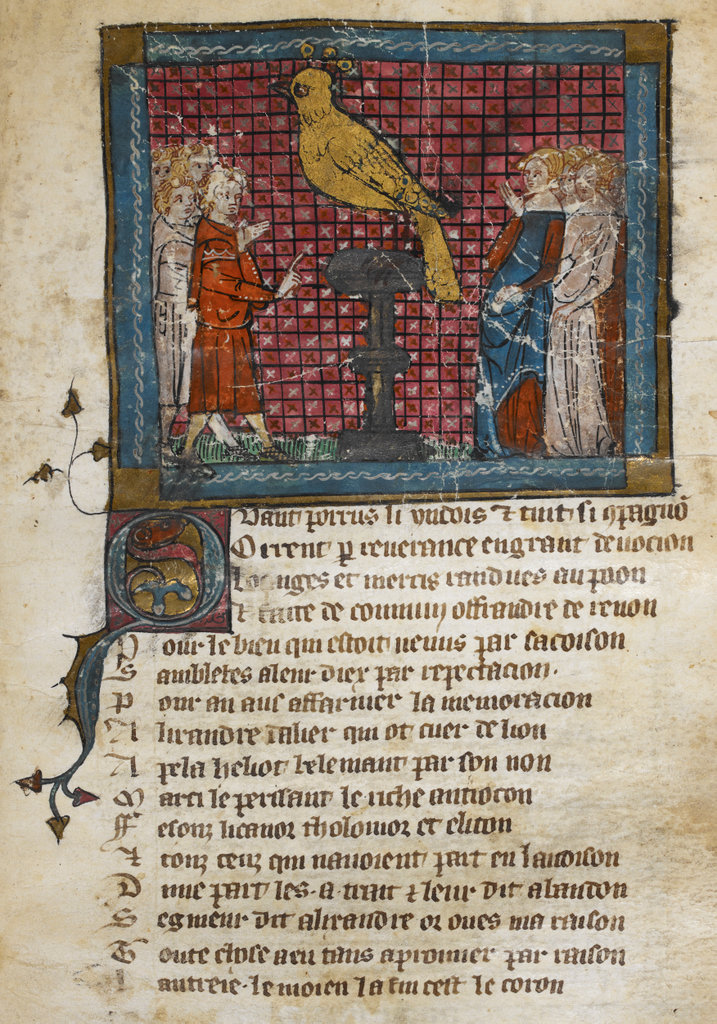
A folio from "Le restor du Paon," showing figures looking at a golden bird. From the British Library archive.

Liel Boyce situates Voeux du Paon within a ‘knightly bird vow cycle’ alongside the Feast of the Swans, the Voeux de l’epervier, the Vouex du héron and the Feast of the Pheasant. Boyce highlights the ‘intertextuality and interconnectedness’ between these historical events and literary imitations, and their correspondence with the medieval imagination and interest in fantasy. Similarly, Mark Cruse raises the importance of Voeux du Paon as a precursor or inspiration for the Feast of the Pheasant (1468) held by Phillipe le Bon to garner oaths to go on crusade. As Boyce argues, Voeux participates in this cycle which was derived from medieval vowing practices, knightly literature, Norse sagas and the King Arthur tradition.

=== Alexander the Great Cycle ===
As an addition to Roman d’Alexandre, Voeux du Paon builds upon and extends the Alexander the Great canon. Voeux was often interpolated with other narratives of Alexander's adventures which present accounts of his bravery and heroism. Elizabeth Morrison points to a scene in Voeux in which Alexander is met at the gates of Epheson to suggest that Alexander is presented here predominantly as a courtier rather than a conquering warrior. Morrison argues that the emphasis on chivalrous romance and courtly culture updates the historical figure for a fourteenth century disposition.

== Manuscripts ==
Numerous manuscripts of Voeux have survived, varying widely in terms of illumination quantity, quality and style. For instance, where the Douce Peacock has 145 miniatures, the Cologny only has 13, despite both being early manuscripts having been produced in Lorraine. Of the around 40 known manuscripts, they are almost all titled Les Voeux du Paon, except for Douce 308 which is labelled ‘il Romans de Cassamus.’ In addition to these, there are later texts of the ‘peacock cycle’: Le restor du paon (The Restoration of the Peacock) by Jean Brisebarre and Le parfait du paon (“The Perfection of the Peacock”) by Jean de Le Mote. Until Dominic Leo’s book Images, Texts, and Marginalia in a “Vows of the Peacock” Manuscript, there had not been a systematic art historical investigation of the Peacock manuscripts. Within this book, Leo presents an extensive catalogue of the Peacock cycle manuscripts, detailing the measurements of manuscripts, the particular decoration and content of each. Leo also compiles information about the provenance, date and place of production and the artist(s) if known.

Leo identifies masters and ateliers through their pigment use, frame details and other hallmarks. Leo highlights the different characteristics in the works of the Fauvel Master, Rennes Rose Painter, the Scat Master, and the Peacock Master, among others. As Leo illuminates, manuscripts which combine the attributes of different ateliers, namely the Montbaston and Mauberge ateliers, suggest a ‘shared network’ in which these artists interacted and worked collaboratively.

=== The Glazier Peacock ===
The primary case study of Dominic Leo’s inquiry is the Glazier Peacock, which is distinguished by the nature of its 'scurrilous marginalia.' Although the patron for this manuscript remains unknown, Leo speculates that the patron was wealthy based on the excess of decorative elements, gilding and marginalia. Leo emphasises the uniqueness of the Glazier Peacock’s marginalia, suggesting that artists had a level of autonomy in creating them. Frequently explicitly sexual, Leo argues the obscenae of the margins completes the more decorous chivalric romance of the text. For Leo, the Glazier's marginalia is valuable as a means of accessing the 'countercurrents and underbelly of the period culture.'

=== Oxford Bodleian (Douce 165) Peacock ===
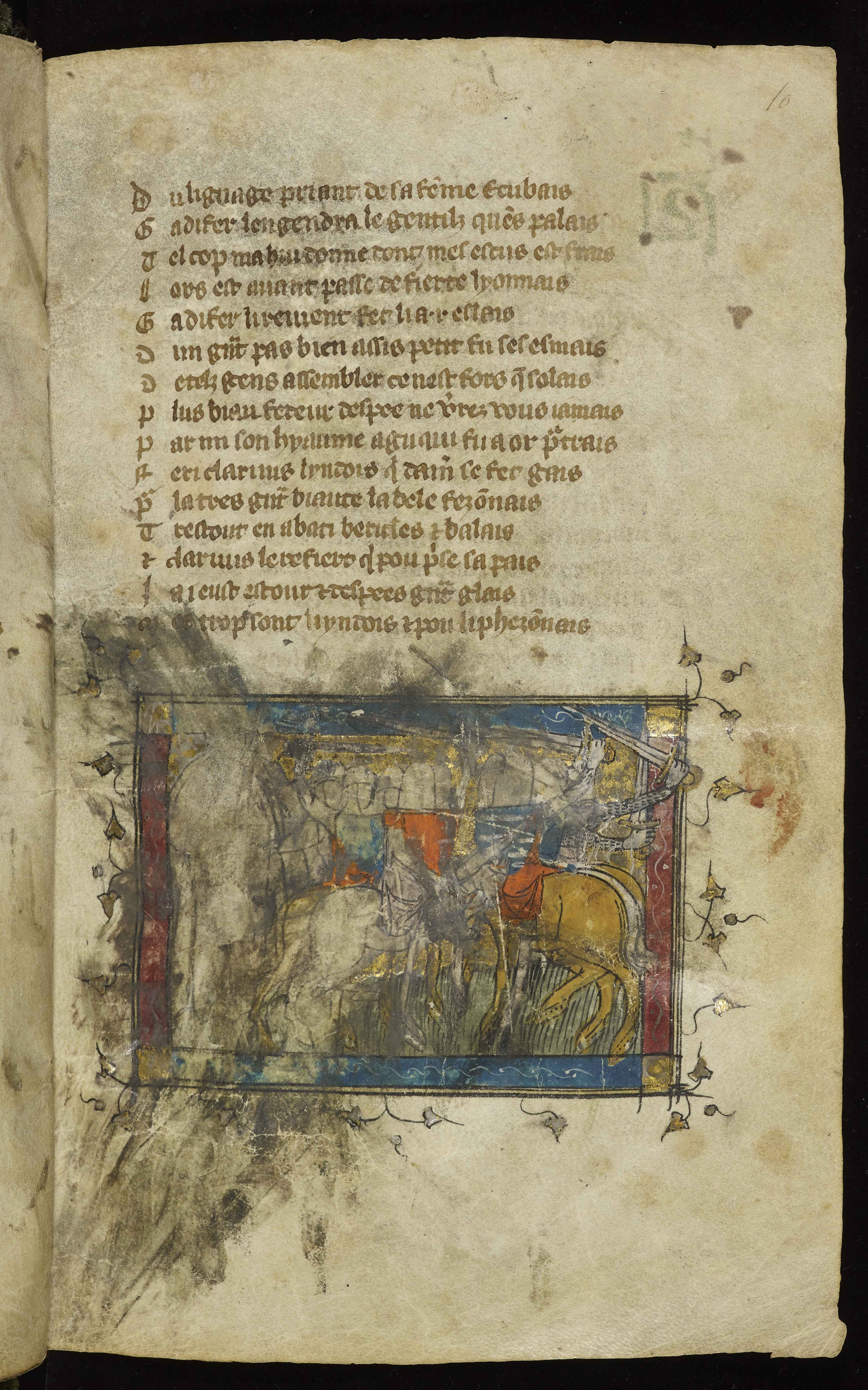
A folio from the Bodleian Library MS. Douce 165 Peacock manuscript with illumination damaged and pigment smeared on the left side of the page.

Another peacock manuscript that has received scholarly attention is Douce 165 (Oxford Bodleian), made in Paris c. 1340. Kathryn Rudy points out that the poem would have been read aloud and oaths physically acted out. Many of this manuscript’s illuminations and marginalia have been damaged, with pigments displaced across the page. Rudy argues that this is a consequence of repeated and targeted touching of the manuscript as part of the courtly performance and ritual surrounding the manuscript.

== Historical significance ==
Outlining the place of Alexander in the Middle Ages, Mark Cruse highlights the presence of multiple manuscripts of the Roman d’Alexandre including copies of Voeux du Paon in the libraries of both Charles V and Philippe le Bon. With the success of printed copies, the poem was encountered by a broader audience beyond the nobility and continued to be used for entertainment and educational purposes.

Vouex du Paon permeated visual culture beyond manuscripts themselves, reflecting the trend of visual historical narratives in medieval France visualised in interiors and possessions like wall paintings, tiles or purses. The inventory of Marguerite de Flandre records four tapestries of Voeux du paon, indicating its translation into other mediums.

=== The Nine Worthies ===
As has Elizabeth Morrison notes, the most profound development produced by Voeux was Longuyon's grouping together of The Nine Worthies. Introduced here, this paradigm brought together nine heroes from history - three from antiquity, the Old Testament and the Christian era respectively - as embodiments of chivalric ideals. Although almost a digression in Voeux, the Nine Worthies became a ubiquitous subject matter in the late Middle Ages. Popular texts such as Le Triomphe des Neuf Preux presented biographies of each of the heroes and they were memorialised in sculpture and various visual media. Morrison suggests that this way of organising history suggested cohesion between antique, biblical and medieval beliefs and therefore acted as a way of justifying or explaining the present.
