= Reginald of Bar (bishop of Metz) =

Reginald of Bar (Renaud de Bar, d. 1316) was bishop of Metz from 1302.

Reginald was the son of Theobald II, Count of Bar, and his wife Joan of Toucy. He was made canon at Rheims, Laon, Verdun and Cambrai and then, before 1298, archdeacon of Brussels. He then became archdeacon of Besançon in 1299 before being made canon and 'princier' of Metz in 1301 and provost of la Madeleine in Verdun in 1302. In mid-1302, he was elected bishop of Metz, but the election was considered irregular since the pope held the privilege of name the holder of this bishopric. To solve the problem, appease the clergy at Metz, and save face, Pope Boniface VIII vetoed the election but then immediately named Reginald as his choice for the bishopric. He was the only prelate from the archdiocese of Trier to assist at the council of Vienne, called by pope Clement V to suppress the Templars. Reginald fought against Theobald II, Duke of Lorraine, then against the magistrates of Metz. He was forced to retire in the messine campaign and died on 4 May 1316, apparently poisoned.

== Liturgical manuscripts ==
Reginald de Bar is known to have owned six liturgical manuscripts all dating from the very beginning of the 14th century, probably between 1302 and 1305. The manuscripts were probably gifts from his relations, including his sister, Marguerite de Bar, abbess of the Abbey of Saint-Maur de Verdun and his mother, Jeanne de Toucy, whose arms figures many times in the margins alongside those of her son. All six manuscripts are designed to be used in church ceremonies by a bishop.

- Breviary for the Use of Verdun – Summer volume (BM Verdun ms. 107)
- Breviary for the Use of Verdun – Winter volume (British Library, Yates Thompson ms. 8)
- Missal for the Use of Verdun, revised for Metz (BM Verdun ms. 98)
- Pontifical for the Use of Metz – Part 1 (Fitzwilliam Museum Cambridge, ms. 298)
- Pontifical for the Use of Metz – Part 2 (Prague, National Library of the Czech Republic, ms. XXIIIC 120), 137 f.
- Ritual for the Use of Metz (BM Metz ms. 43), destroyed in 1944

These manuscripts, especially the two volume Breviary of Verdun, are renowned for their rich illuminations, blason, marginalia and historiated initials.

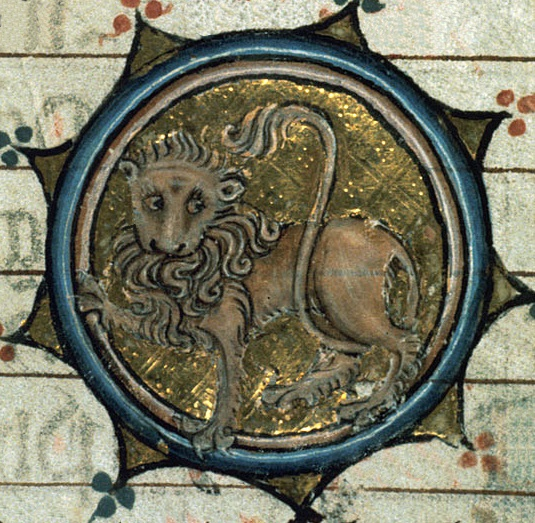
Lion, from July, Breviary of Verdun, Winter, British Library

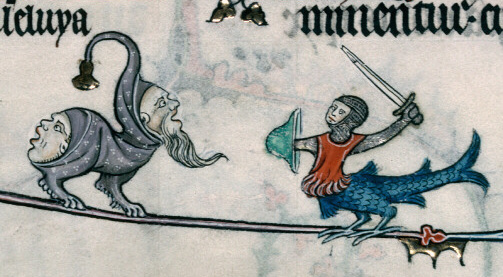
Marginalia, Breviary of Verdun, Summer, BM. Verdun

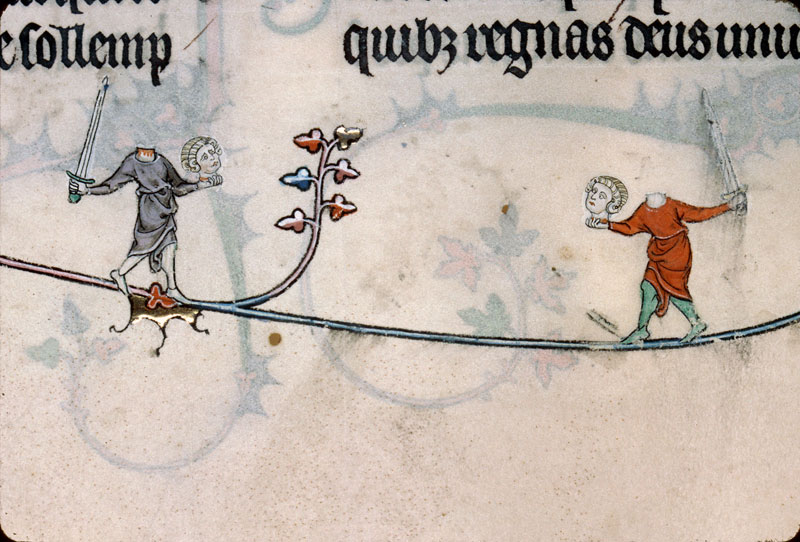
Combatants carrying their heads, Breviary of Verdun, Summer
