= William II of Flanders =

Count of Flanders (1224–1251)

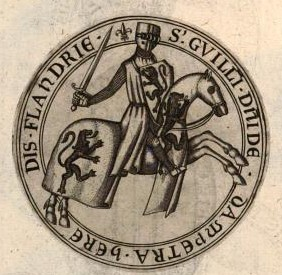
William's seal

William III (1224 – 6 June 1251) was the lord of Dampierre from 1231 and count of Flanders from 1247 until his death. He was the son of William II of Dampierre and Margaret II of Flanders.

== Reign ==
Margaret inherited Flanders and Hainault in 1244 and immediately the War of the Succession of Flanders and Hainault began between William and his brothers, the Dampierre claimants, and the children of Margaret's first marriage to Bouchard of Avesnes. Margaret favoured William and declared him her heir. In 1246, Louis IX of France intervened to arbitrate the conflict and declared Flanders to William and Hainault to John I of Avesnes. Margaret officially invested William as count in 1247.

In November of that year, William married Beatrice of Brabant, daughter of Henry II, Duke of Brabant and Marie of Hohenstaufen. They had no children. Meanwhile, the fight continued over Namur between the Dampierres and the Avesnes. On 19 May 1250, peace was signed. On 6 June the next year, William died at a tournament in Trazegnies. (Note: David Crouch states William died from a heart attack) (Note: Paul Arblaster states William was murdered.) The war began anew with Guy, William's younger brother, taking up Flanders and the Dampierre claim.

== Sources ==
- Arblaster, Paul (2012). A History of the Low Countries. Palgrave Macmillan.
- Crouch, David (2005). Tournament. Vol. 4. Hambledon and Continuum.
- Evergates, Theodore (2007). The Aristocracy in the County of Champagne, 1100-1300. University of Pennsylvania Press.
- Dunbabin, Jean (2011). The French in the Kingdom of Sicily, 1266–1305. Cambridge University Press.
- Jordan, William Chester (1979). Louis IX and the Challenge of the Crusade: A Study in Rulership. Princeton University Press. ISBN 978-0-691-05285-4.
- Lester, Anne E. (2011). Creating Cistercian Nuns: The Women's Religious Movement and Its Reform in Thirteenth Century Champagne. Cornell University Press.
- Vann, Theresa M. (1993). Queens, Regents and Potentates. Academia Press.

Preceded by Margaret II	Count of Flanders; 1247–1251	Succeeded by Guy
