= William II of Dampierre =

French nobleman and constable (1196–1231)

- Born: 1196
- Died: 3 September 1231
- Noble family: House of Dampierre
- Spouse: Margaret II of Flanders
- Issue: William III of Dampierre; Guy of Dampierre; John of Dampierre; Joan of Dampierre; Marie of Dampierre
- Father: Guy II of Dampierre
- Mother: Mathilde of Bourbon

William II (1196 – 3 September 1231) was the lord of Dampierre from 1216 until his death. He was the son of Guy II, constable of Champagne, and Mathilde of Bourbon.

His brother, Archambaud VIII, inherited Bourbon, and William inherited Dampierre. He married the future Countess Margaret II of Flanders and Hainault in 1223. In 1226 William and Margaret founded a Cistercian nunnery at Saint-Dizier. Their sons William III and John continued to confirm and patronize the nunnery during their lives, including William II's burial there in 1231. William and Margaret founded more Cisterian nunneries throughout the county of Flanders, including Flines Abbey.

== Children ==
He had four children (three sons) by Margaret and the eldest took part in the War of the Succession of Flanders and Hainault:

- William III, Count of Flanders and Lord of Kortrijk
- Guy, Count of Flanders and Margrave of Namur
- John I, Lord of Dampierre, Viscount of Troyes, and Constable of Champagne
- Joanna, married in 1239 to Hugh III of Rethel, then in 1243 to Theobald II of Bar

== Sources ==
- Evergates, Theodore (2007). The Aristocracy in the County of Champagne, 1100-1300. University of Pennsylvania Press.
- Lester, Anne E. (2011). Creating Cistercian Nuns: The Women's Religious Movement and Its Reform in Thirteenth Century Champagne. Cornell University Press.
