= Erard of Bar, Seigneur de Pierrepont et d'Ancerville =

Erard of Bar
- Born: c. 1262; Meuse
- Died: c. 1335; Pierrepont, Meurthe-et-Moselle
- Noble family: House of Bar
- Spouse: Isabella of Lorraine
- Issue Detail: Theobald of Bar, Seigneur de Pierrepont
- Father: Theobald II of Bar
- Mother: Jeanne de Toucy

Erard of Bar, (French: Érard de Bar) was a monk by 1292 and then seigneur de Pierrepont, Meurthe-et-Moselle et d'Ancerville by 1302. Erard was one of eight sons born to Theobald II, Count of Bar and his wife, Jeanne de Toucy.

He married Isabella of Lorraine (d. 12 December 1353), daughter of Theobald II, Duke of Lorraine, and Isabelle de Rumigny; they had had six children. Erard died in 1335 at Pierrepont, France.

== Issue ==
- Thiebauld de Bar, Seigneur de Pierrepont (b. c. 1314 – d. c. 1354) married in 1340 to Marie de Namur, daughter of John I, Marquis of Namur and Marie of Artois; had two children.
- Marie de Bar (d. c. 1380) married Jean de Dampierre, Seigneur de Saint Dizier.
- Ferri de Bar, Seigneur de Norroy (d. 9 Nov 1368) also Canon at Reims Cathedral in 1362, Canon at Liège and Cambrai Cathedrals in 1363. Later elected Bishop of Liège in 1364.
- Jean de Bar, Seigneur de Pierrepont et St. Amand-en-Puisaye (d. 1366) married before 1353 to Catherine de Châtillon-en-Bazois. Jean and his wife had one child: Jeanne de Bar (d. 25 Sep 1361).
- Renaud de Bar, Seigneur de Pierrefitte (d. between 18 Jan 1354 – 1 Apr 1359) had one child.
- Henriette de Bar, Dame de Saint-Amand et de Puisaye (d. after 29 Mar 1380) married before 11 Apr 1359 to Heinrich, Graf von Lützelstein.
