= Joan of Dampierre =

French noblewoman (c. 1225–1245/6)

Joan of Dampierre (c. 1225 – 1245/1246) was the eldest daughter of Margaret II, Countess of Flanders, and William II of Dampierre.

In 1239, her mother arranged her to be wed to count Hugh III of Rethel. Margaret stipulated that her dowry should be returned in case the count died without giving Joan a child. When this indeed happened, the money was refunded.

Joan was betrothed to Theobald II, Count of Bar, in 1243 and married him two years later. She died childless not long afterwards.
