= Frederick III of Lorraine =

Duke of Lorraine from 1251 to 1303

Frederick III
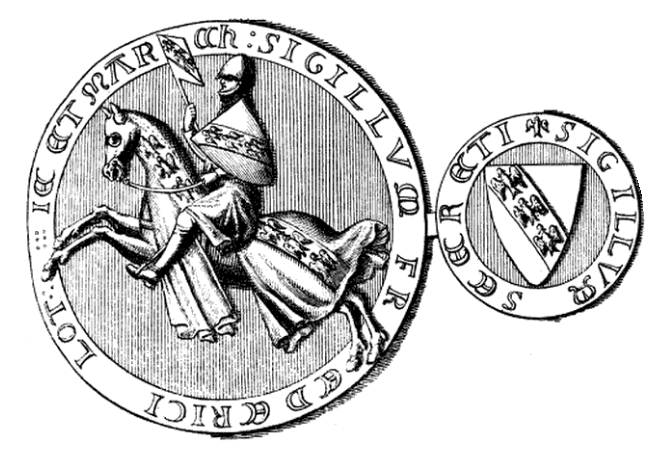
- SIGILLUM FREDERICI LOT[HARING]IE ET MARCH[IONIS]

Duke of Lorraine
- Reign: 9 February 1251 - 31 December 1303
- Predecessor: Matthias II
- Successor: Theobald II
- Born: 1240
- Died: 31 December 1303 (aged 63)
- Spouse: Margaret of Navarre
- Issue: Theobald II, Duke of Lorraine; Matthias; Frederick; Frederick; Gerard; Isabella; Catherine; Agnes; Margaret
- House: House of Lorraine
- Father: Matthias II, Duke of Lorraine
- Mother: Catherine of Limburg

Frederick III (French: Ferry) (1240 – 31 December 1303) was the Duke of Lorraine from 1251 to his death. He was the only son and successor of Matthias II and Catherine of Limburg.

He was not yet thirteen years of age when his father died, so his mother assumed the regency for a few years. In 1255, he married Margaret, the daughter of King Theobald I of Navarre and Margaret of Bourbon. Frederick's father-in-law was the Count of Champagne as well, and the marriage of Margaret with Frederick signified the Gallicization of Lorraine and the beginnings of tension between French and German influences which characterises its later history.

When Joan I of Navarre, Margaret's niece, (the daughter of her brother, Henry I of Navarre), married Philip the Fair, the future king of France, in 1284, the ties to France grew. The long-held loyalty of the dukes of Lorraine to the Holy Roman Emperor had waned in the first half of the thirteenth century and French influence was pervasive, leading to its permanent attachment to France in 1766.

During Frederick's reign, he fought the bishops of Metz until Pope Clement IV excommunicated him and put his duchy under an interdict.

In 1257, after the elections following the death of King William of Holland resulted in the contested election of both Richard, Earl of Cornwall and Alfonso X of Castile, Frederick of Lorraine sided with Alfonso, who through his mother Beatrix was the grandson of the Hohenstaufen Philip of Swabia. The rivalry between the two kings led to little actual combat and after Richard's death the 1273 election of Rudolf of Habsburg and the subsequent withdrawal of Alfonso reestablished unity.

== Family ==
By his marriage to Margaret, he had the following issue:

- Theobald (1263–1312), his successor in Lorraine
- Matthias (died 1282), lord of Beauregard
- Frederick (died 1299), bishop of Orléans (1297–1299)
- Frederick (died c. 1320), lord of Plombiéres, Romont, and Brémoncourt
- Gerard (known 1317)
- Isabelle (died 1335), married (1287) Louis III, Duke of Lower Bavaria, of the Royal House of Wittelsbach; then Lord Henry of Sully; and then (1306) Count Henry III of Vaudémont (died 1348)
- Catherine, lady of Romont, married (1290) Conrad II (died 1350), count of Fribourg
- Agnes, married John II (died 1302), sire of Harcourt
- Margaret, married Eberhard I, Count of Württemberg, of the Royal House of Württemberg

== Sources ==
- Bogdan, Henry (2007). La Lorraine des ducs (in French). Perrin.
- Fray, Jean-Luc (2007). Villes et bourgs de Lorraine: réseaux urbains et centralité au Moyen Âge (in French). Presses Universitaires Blaise-Pascal.

== See also ==
- Dukes of Lorraine family tree

Preceded by Matthias II	Duke of Lorraine; 1251–1302	Succeeded by Theobald II
