= War of the Flemish Succession =

War

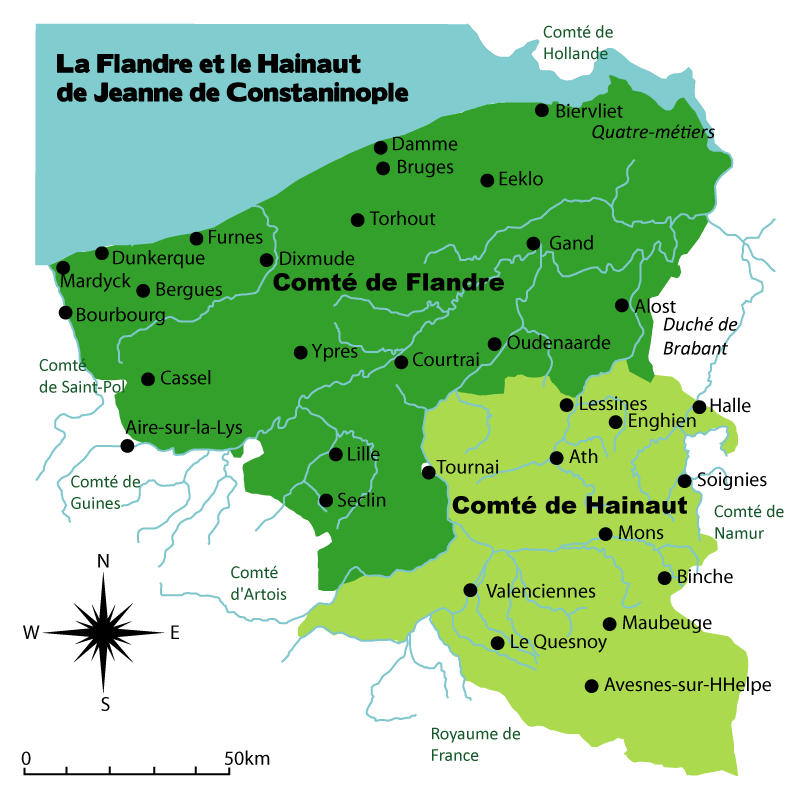
Date	1244 – 1254
Location	Counties of Flanders and Hainaut
Result	Flanders passed to the Dampierres, Hainaut to the House of Avesnes

Belligerents
House of Flanders; House of Dampierre County of Anjou	House of Avesnes; County of Holland County of Zeeland

Commanders and leaders
Margaret II; William II; Guy of Dampierre Charles I	John of Avesnes William II

The War of the Flemish Succession was a series of feudal conflicts in the mid-thirteenth century between the children of Countess Margaret II of Flanders. They concerned the succession to the countship of two counties, one a fief of the king of France (Flanders) and one a fief of the king of Germany (Hainault).

== Origins ==
When Baldwin IX, count of Flanders and Hainault, left on the Fourth Crusade in 1202, he left his western domains under his eldest daughter Joan. Joan inherited the counties on Baldwin's death and, despite two marriages, died without heirs in 1244. She was succeeded by her younger sister, the aforementioned Margaret.

Margaret's first marriage, to Bouchard of Avesnes, was annulled in 1221 on orders from Joan and the excommunication of Bouchard. By Bouchard, however, Margaret had already had three children, including John I of Avesnes. Nevertheless, in 1223, she remarried. With her second husband, William II of Dampierre (d.1231), she also had three children, including William III and Guy of Dampierre.

The contested division of the rights to Margaret's inheritance between the sons of Avesnes and those of Dampierre were the cause of the conflicts known as the "war of the succession of Flanders and Hainault."

== First conflict ==
The first conflict opened with Margaret's succession in 1244. John I of Avesnes and William of Dampierre, half brothers, fought between themselves until King Louis IX intervened in 1246. Louis gave Hainault (technically not his to give) to John I of Avesnes and Flanders (indeed his vassal) to William of Dampierre. Margaret, in light of this judgement, gave the government of Flanders over to William of Dampierre in 1247. She did not however relinquish her governance of Hainault to John I of Avesnes.

In 1251, William III of Dampierre died and Flanders passed to his brother Guy of Dampierre.

== Second conflict ==
In 1248, Louis had left on the Seventh Crusade and remained abroad for six years. John I of Avesnes quickly comprehended that his mother did not intend to give him the government of Hainault as she had that of Flanders to her other sons. John I of Avesnes revolted against his mother and attacked his half-brother Guy of Dampierre, who had just become count of Flanders.

John I of Avesnes persuaded the German anti-king William of Holland to seize Hainault and Flemish territory within the empire. The fighting continued until the Battle of West-Capelle on 4 July 1253, when John I of Avesnes gained a brilliant victory over Guy of Dampierre and forced him and his mother to respect the division of Louis and grant him Hainault.

== Third conflict ==
Margaret did not rest in her defeat and did not recognise herself as overcome. She instead granted Hainault to Charles of Anjou, the brother of King Louis, who had recently returned from the crusade. Charles took up her cause and warred with John I of Avesnes, but failed to take Valenciennes and just missed being killed in a skirmish. When Louis returned in 1254, he reaffirmed his earlier arbitration and ordered his brother to get out of the conflict. Charles returned to Provence. With this second arbitration of the holy king, the conflict closed and John I of Avesnes was secure in Hainault.
