= Jehan de Grise =

14th-century Flemish miniaturist

Jehan de Grise (Note: Also spelt Iehan de Grise, Jean de Grise, Jean de Gryse, and otherwise.) (fl. 1325–1345) was a Flemish miniature painter and illuminator, active in Bruges. His workshop illuminated the manuscript Li romans du boin roi Alixandre ('The Romance of the Good King Alexander') between 1338 and 1344 (Oxford, Bodleian Library, MS Bodley 264), which contains early visual evidence of Medieval puppetry.

== Gallery ==
MS Bodley 264

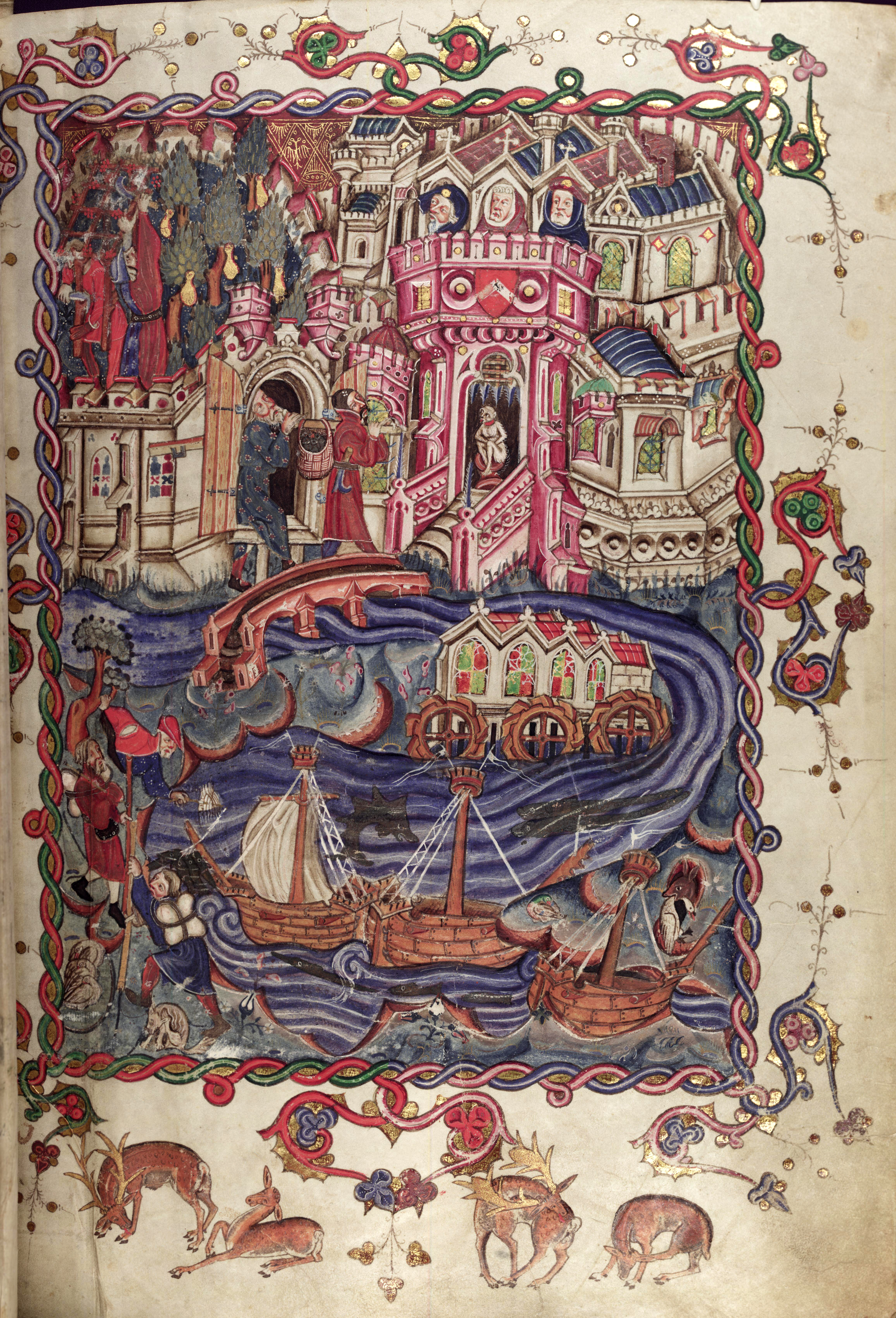
Miniature (f.1r)

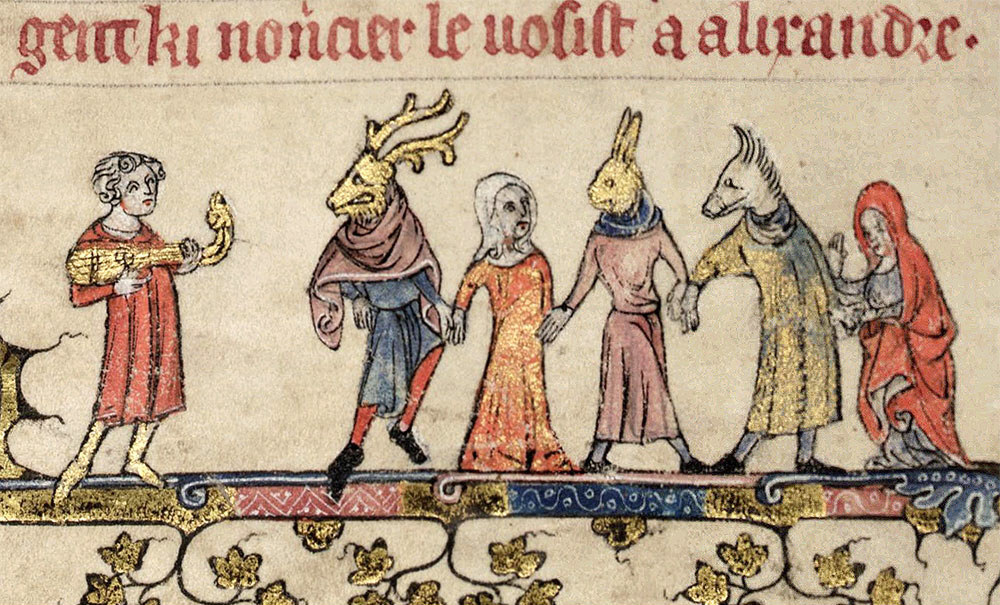
Animals as humans (f.21v)

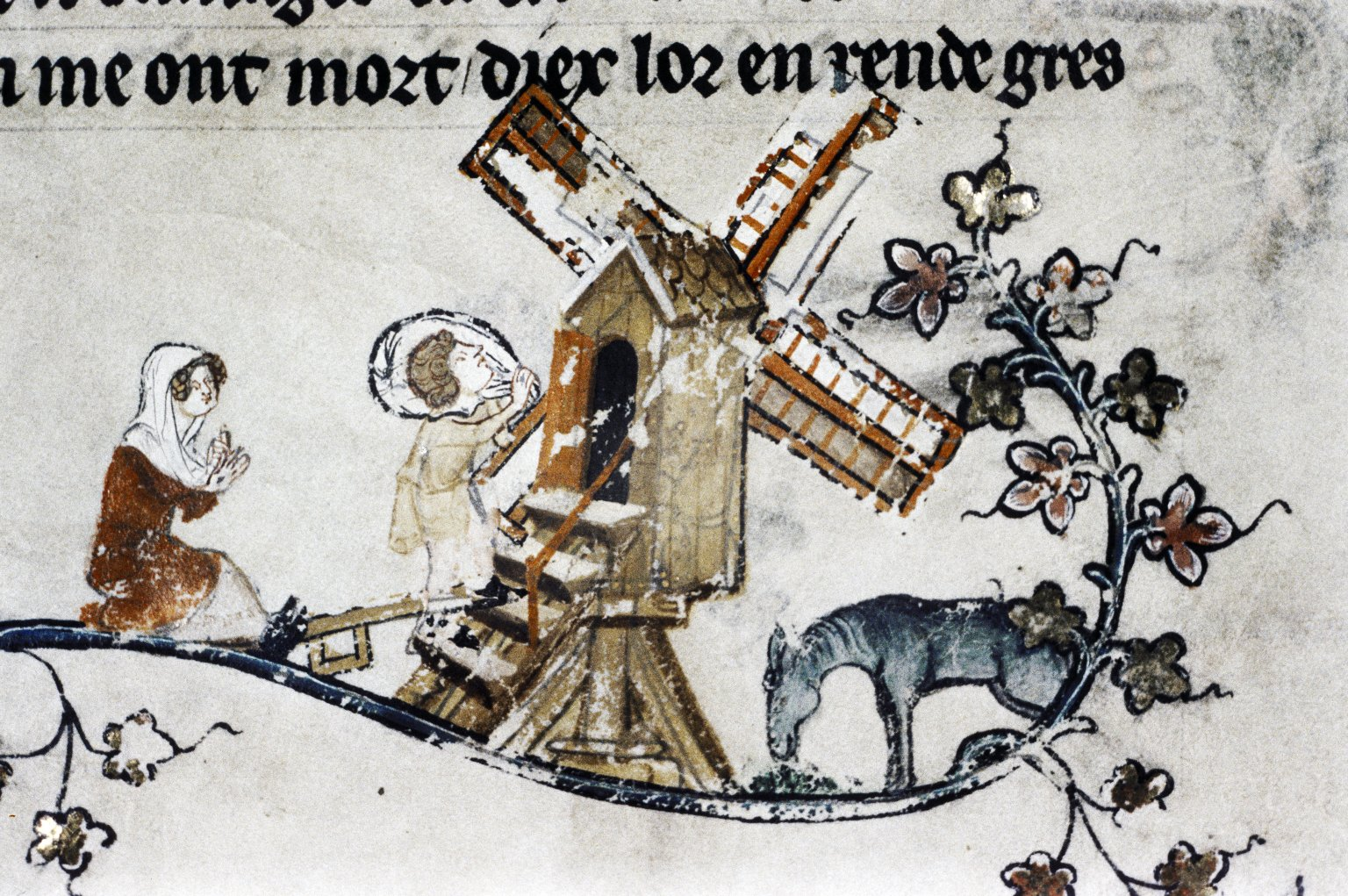
Post mill (f.49r)

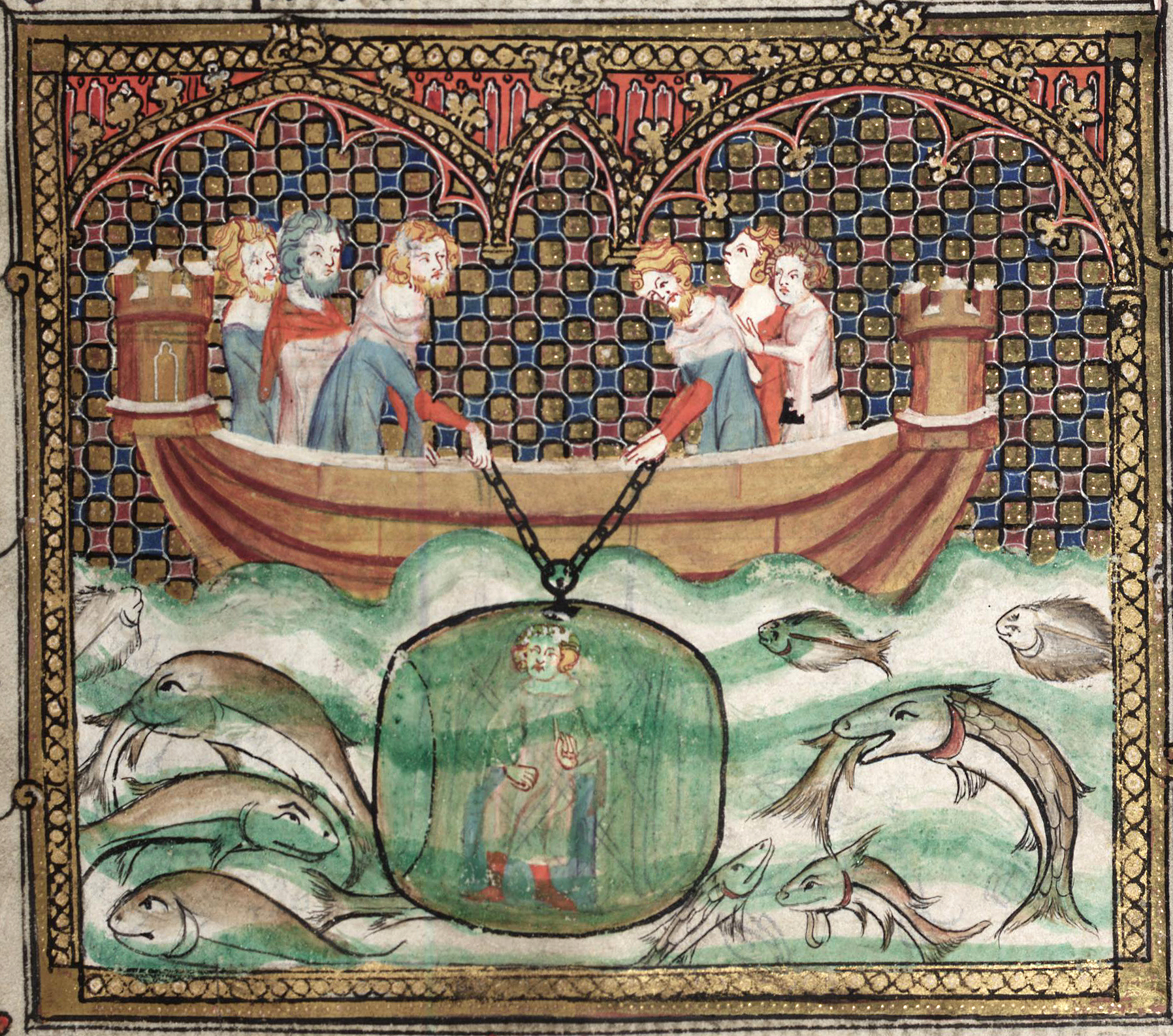
Alexander the Great in a glass diving-bell (f.50r)

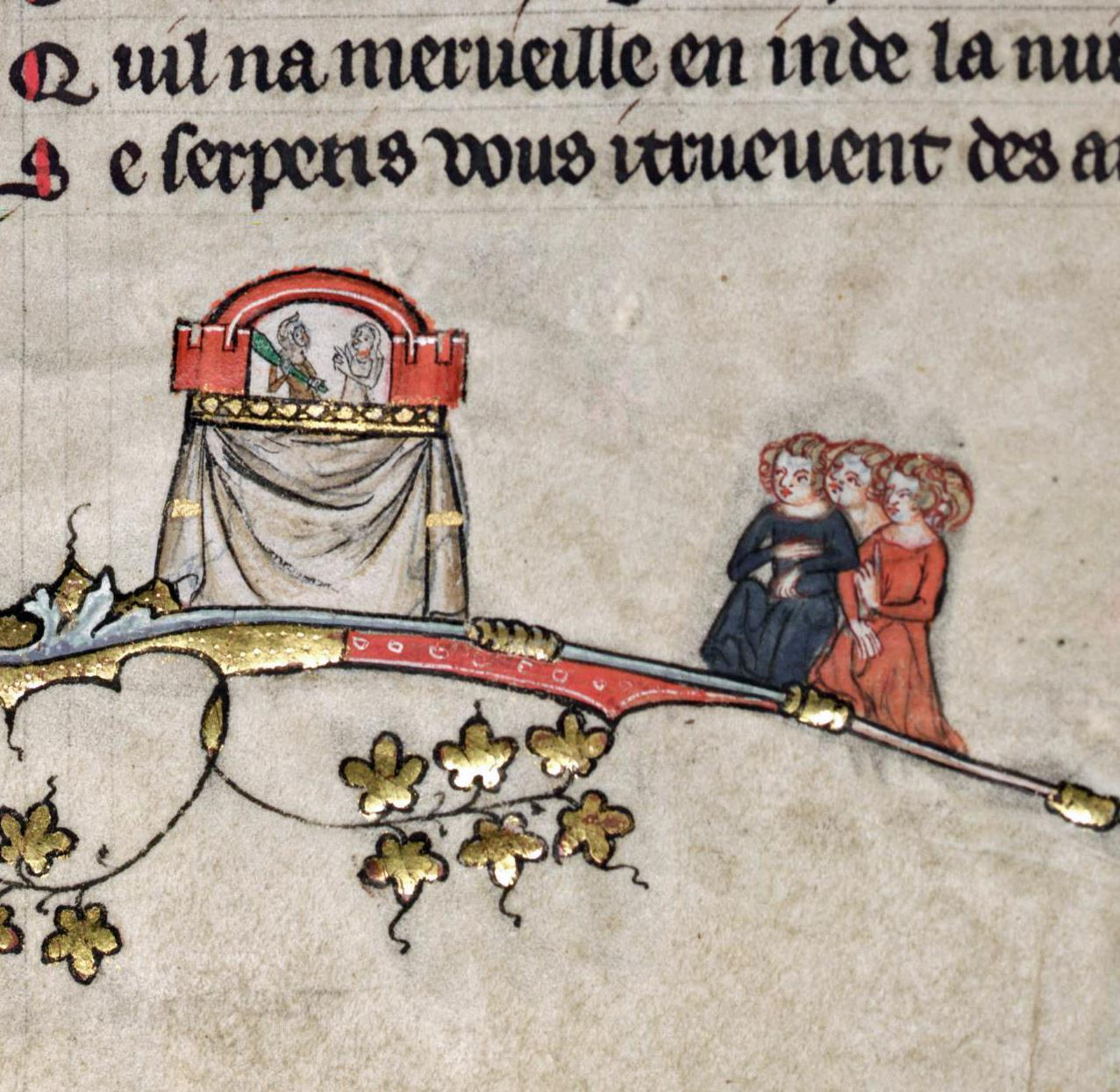
Illuminated border depicting a puppet show (f.54v)

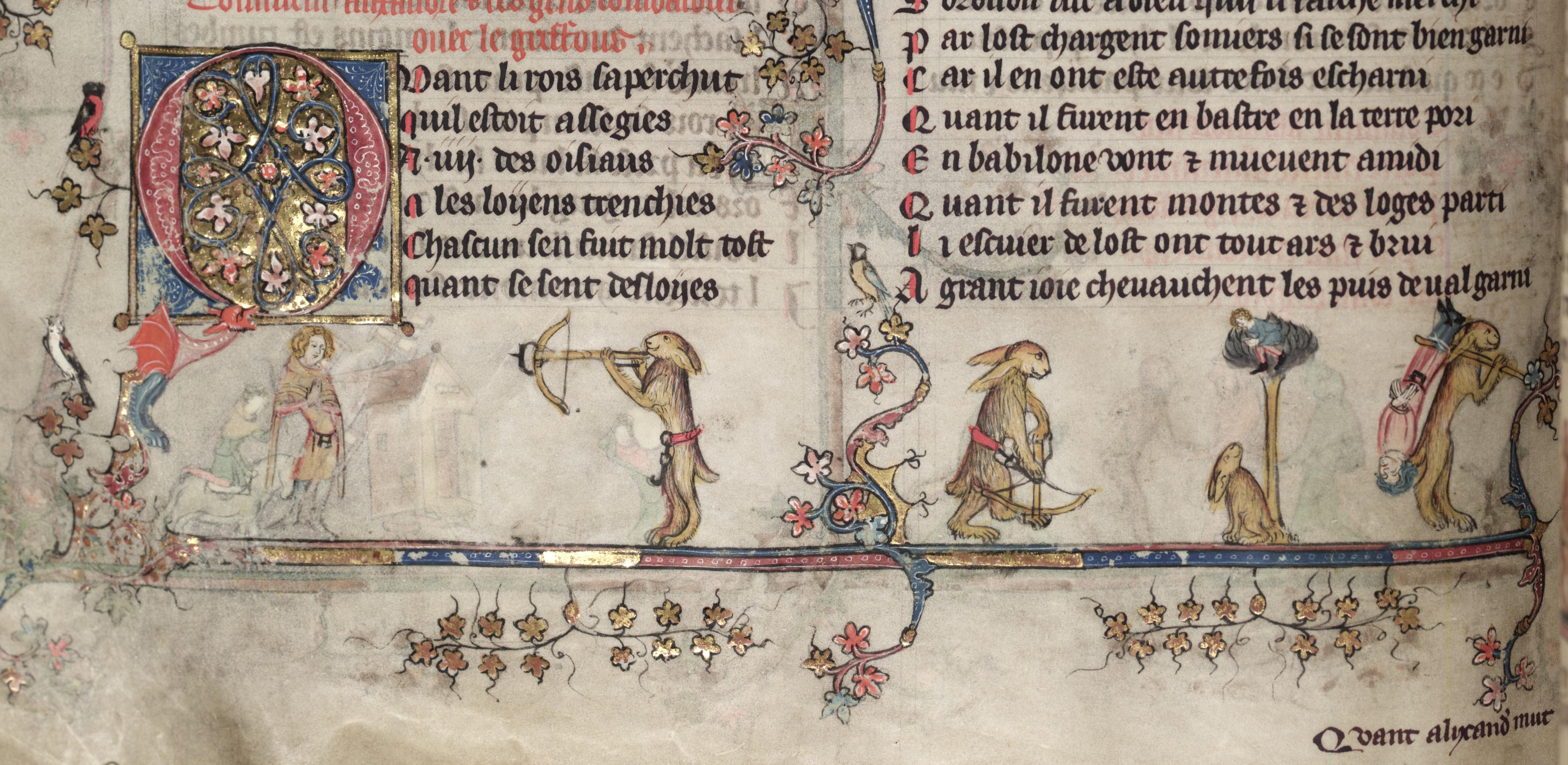
Hares hunting humans (f.81v)

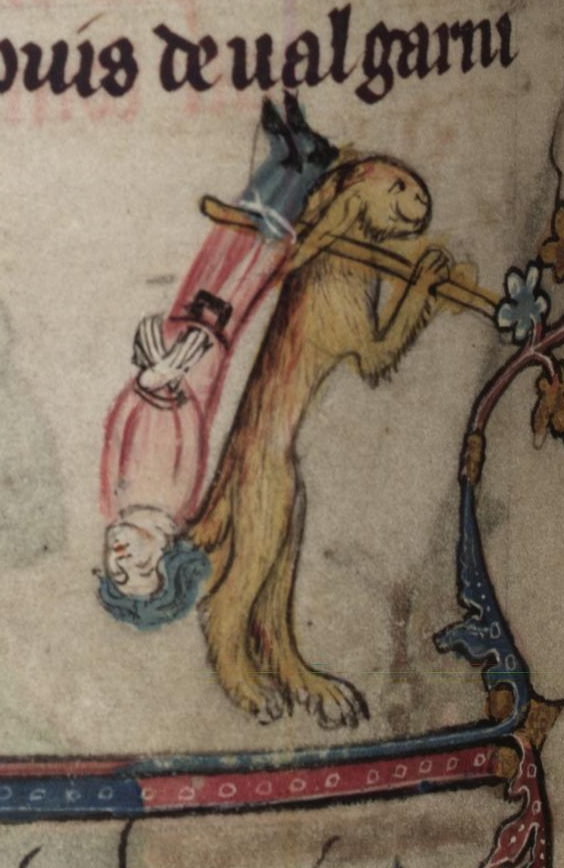
Hare hunting a man (f.81v)

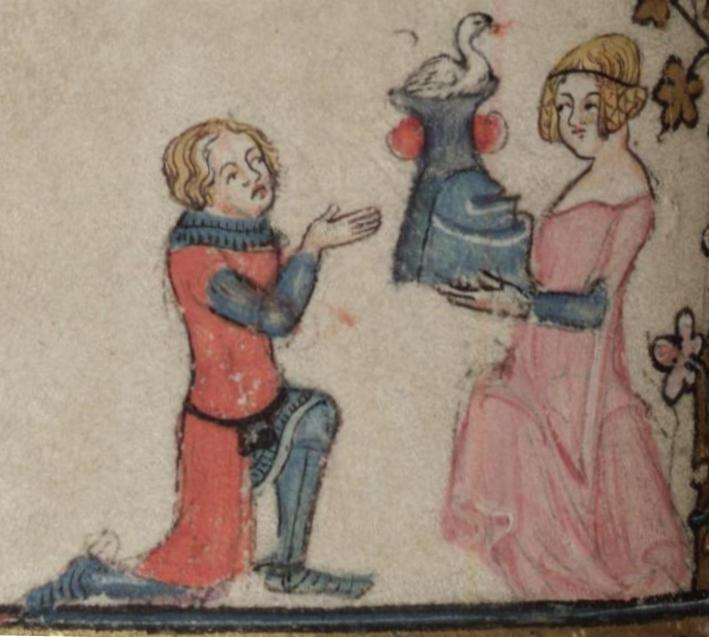
Maiden presents kneeling knight with swan-crested helmet (f.101v)

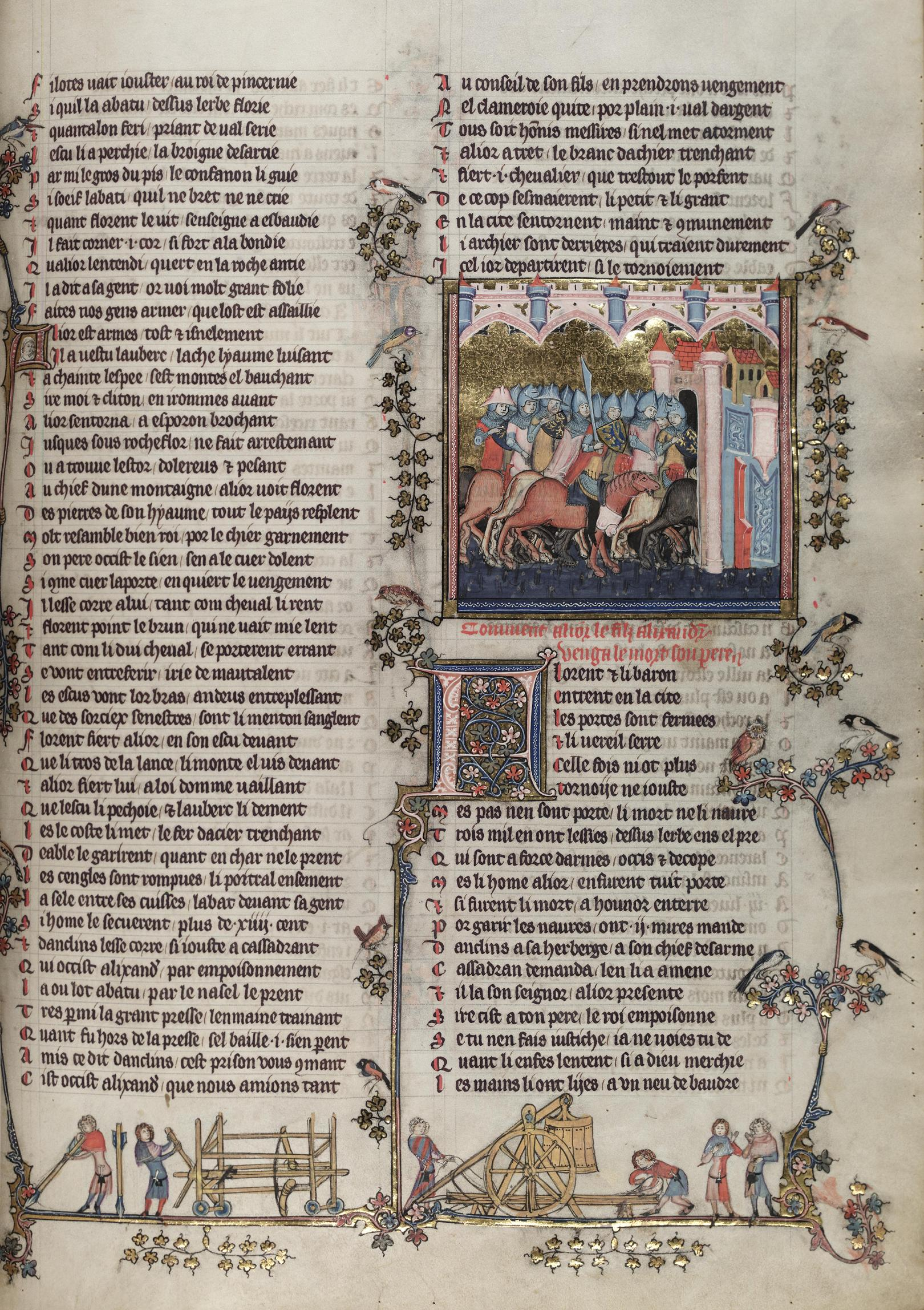
Miniature and illumination (f.201r)

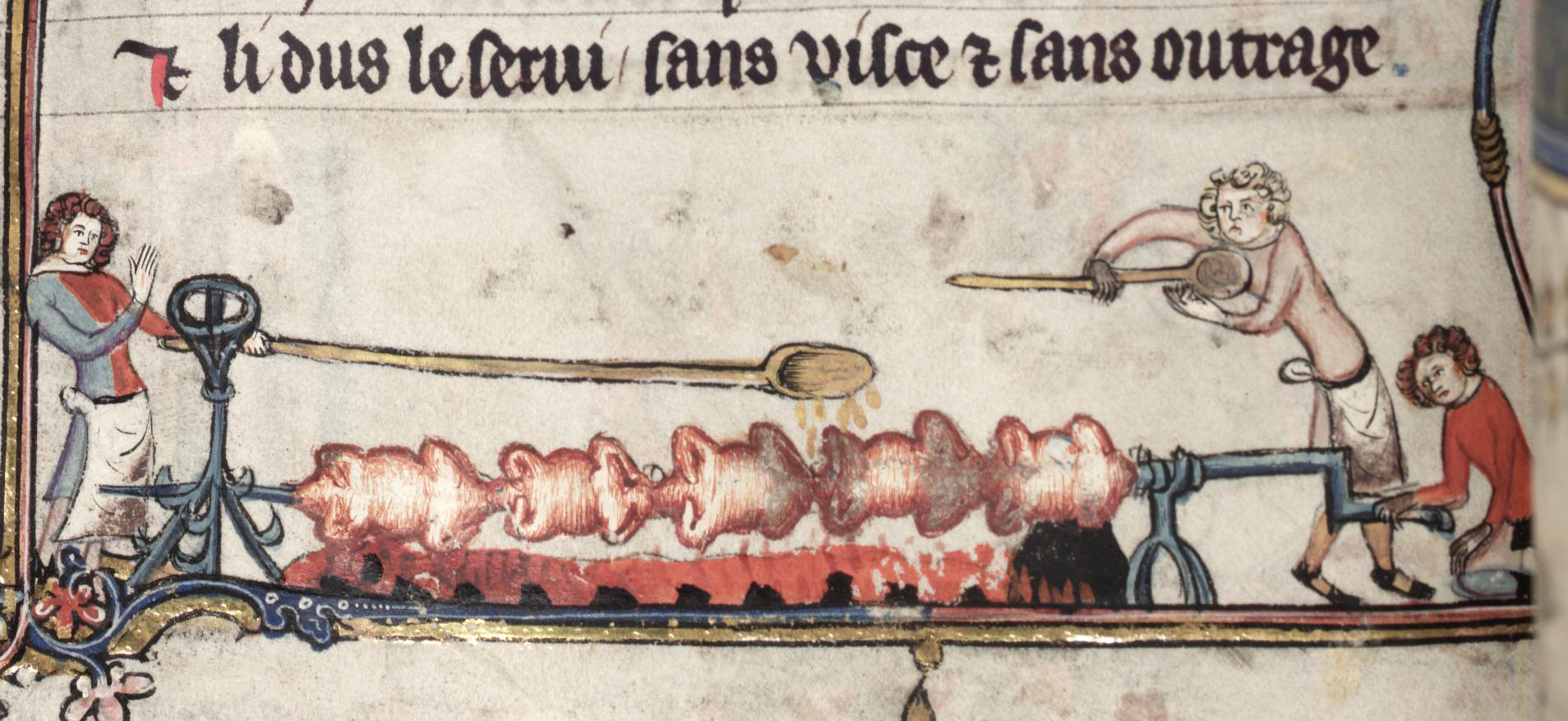
Meat on spit

== See also ==
- Alexander Romance

== Sources ==
- Gepp-Labusiak, Miriam (2021). "Grise, Jean de". Beyer, Andreas; Savoy, Bénédicte; Tegethoff, Wolf (eds.). Allgemeines Künstlerlexikon (online ed.). Berlin, New York: K. G. Saur. Retrieved 29 May 2023 – via De Gruyter.
- Smeyers, M. (1991). "Jean de Grise". Enciclopedia dell' Arte Medievale (online ed.). Treccani. Retrieved 29 May 2023.
- "Jehan de Grise". World Encyclopedia of Puppetry Arts (online ed.). Union Internationale de la Marionnette. Retrieved 29 May 2023.
