= Theobald II of Bar =

Count of Bar (1221–1291)

Theobald II
- Count of Bar
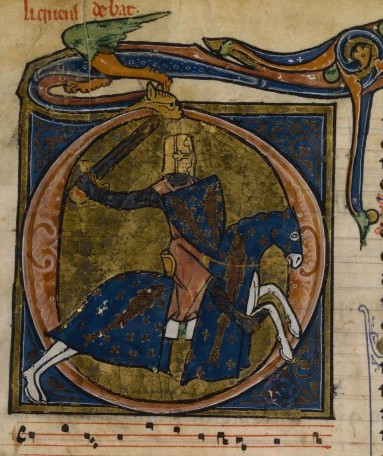
- Theobald in the Chansonnier du Roi
- Born: c. 1221
- Died: October 1291
- Spouse: Jeanne of Dampierre; Jeanne de Toucy
- Issue: Henry of Bar; John of Bar; Charles of Bar; Theobald of Bar; Reginald of Bar; Erard of Bar; Peter of Bar; Philippa of Bar; Alice of Bar; Mary of Bar; Isabelle of Bar; Yolanda of Bar; Margaret of Bar; Philip of Bar; Henrietta of Bar
- House: House of Bar
- Father: Henry II of Bar
- Mother: Philippa of Dreux

Theobald II (1221– October 1291) was a count of Bar. He was the son of Henry II of Bar and Philippa of Dreux. He became count of Bar when his father was killed during the Barons' Crusade in 1239, but news of Henry's death did not reach him until 1240. As Theobald was still a minor, his mother ruled as regent until 17 March 1242. Theobald's own children included his successor Henry III and the bishop Reginald of Bar.

== Marriage ==
Theobald II married twice, first in 1245 to Joan, daughter of William II of Dampierre and Margaret II, Countess of Flanders. They were betrothed on 3 May 1243 and married two years later, in March 1245 or on 31 August 1245. The marriage was brief and childless. The next year, in 1246, Theobald married Jeanne de Toucy, daughter of John, lord of Toucy, Saint-Fargeau and Puisaye and his wife Emma de Laval.

== Issue ==
His children with Jeanne de Toucy were:

- Henry of Bar, succeeded his father as Henry III, Count of Bar; married Eleanor of England
- John of Bar, married Jeanne of Dreux, daughter of Robert IV of Dreux and Beatrice, Countess of Montfort
- Charles of Bar, died young
- Theobald of Bar, elected Bishop of Metz in 1296; bishop of Liège in 1302; killed in battle in Rome on 26 May 1312; buried at St Peter's, Rome
- Reginald of Bar, canon at Reims, Beauvais, Cambrai, Laon and Verdun; archdeacon at Brussels and Besançon; bishop of Metz in 1302; death by poisoning
- Erard of Bar, was a monk by 1292 and then seigneur de Pierrepont et d'Ancerville by 1302; married Isabelle of Lorraine, daughter of Theobald II, Duke of Lorraine, and Isabelle de Rumigny; had six children
- Peter of Bar, seigneur de Pierrefort in 1300; Herr zu Bettingen ("seigneur of Bettingen"), 1326/1334; married firstly Jeanne de Vienne, daughter of Hugues de Vienne, Sire de Longwy et de Pagny (grandson of Isabella of Burgundy); had four children with first wife; married secondly, Eleonore de Poitiers-Valentinois
- Philippa of Bar, married Otto IV, Count of Burgundy
- Alice of Bar, married Matthias of Lorraine, seigneur de Beauregard, son of Frederick III, Duke of Lorraine
- Mary of Bar, married Gobert, Sire d'Aspremont
- Isabelle of Bar
- Yolanda of Bar
- Margaret of Bar, abbess of Saint-Maur à Verdun
- Philip of Bar
- Henrietta of Bar

== Sources ==
- Bubenicek, Michelle (2002). Quand les femmes gouvernent: droit et politique au XIVe siècle (in French). Ecole de Chartes.
- Evergates, Theodore (2007). The Aristocracy in the County of Champagne, 1100-1300. University of Pennsylvania Press.
- Leach, Elizabeth Eva (2023). Medieval Sex Lives: The Sounds of Courtly Intimacy on the Francophone Borders. Cornell University Press.
- Richard, Jean (1983). Lloyd, Simon (ed.). Saint Louis, Crusader King of France. Translated by Birrell, Jean. Cambridge University Press.
- Wirth, Jean; Engammare, Isabelle (2008). Les marges à drôleries des manuscrits gothiques (1250–1350). Librairie Droz.
