= Theobald (bishop of Liège) =

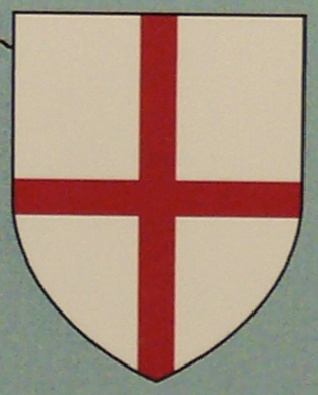

Theobald of Bar (Thibaut of Bar, Thiébaut de Bar) was the third surviving son of Theobald II of Bar and Jeanne de Toucy. He was prince-bishop of Liège from 1302 until his death in 1312, while serving in the retinue of Henri VII of Luxembourg.

== Life ==
In 1296, on the death of Bouchard d'Avesnes, bishop of Metz, he was one of the candidates in competition with Frederick of Lorraine, bishop of Orléans. In the end Gérard de Rhéninghe was chosen.

Adolph of Waldeck, prince-bishop of Liège, died at the end of 1302. Of three candidate, Guillaume d'Arras was elected. He, however, turned down the position, claiming his background was too humble, and designated Theobald. Theobald's election gained papal approval 13 March 1303; Theobald was then in fact in Rome.

He allied himself with Philip IV of France, in 1304. Two years later his relative Henri VII of Luxembourg became King of the Romans; Theobald was a close adviser. When Henry went to Rome in 1312 to be consecrated as Holy Roman Emperor, Theobald accompanied him. There he was attacked and mortally wounded by Robert I of Naples.

== In literature ==
He was commemorated in a contemporary poem, Voeux de l'épervier, recorded in the Chroniques de Metz. He is identified as the dedicatee of the Voeux du paon by Jacques de Longuyon in an explicit in one source of this widely copied poem (Paris, Bibliothèque nationale fr.12565).

== Family ==
He was a son of Theobald II of Bar, and of Jeanne de Toucy.
