= Margaret II of Flanders =

Countess of Flanders from 1244 to 1278

Margaret II
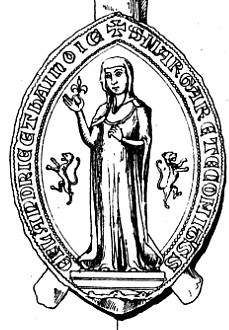
- Margaret's seal

Countess of Flanders
- Reign: 1244–1278
- Predecessor: Joan
- Successor: Guy

Countess of Hainaut
- Reign: 1244–1280
- Predecessor: Joan
- Successor: John II
- Born: 1202
- Died: 10 February 1280 (aged 77); Ghent
- Spouses: Bouchard IV of Avesnes (m. 1212; ann. 1215) William II of Dampierre (m. 1223; died 1231)
- Issue: John I, Count of Hainaut; Baldwin of Avesnes; William II, Count of Flanders; Guy, Count of Flanders; John of Dampierre; Joan of Dampierre; Marie of Dampierre
- House: House of Flanders
- Father: Baldwin I, Latin Emperor
- Mother: Marie of Champagne

Margaret, often called Margaret of Constantinople (1202 – 10 February 1280), ruled as Countess of Flanders during 1244–1278 and Countess of Hainaut during 1244–1253 and 1257–1280. She was the younger daughter of Count Baldwin IX and Marie of Champagne.

Called the Black (la Noire) due to her scandalous life, the children of both her marriages disputed the inheritance of her counties in the War of the Succession of Flanders and Hainault.

== Life ==
=== Childhood ===
Her father left on the Fourth Crusade before she was born, and her mother left two years later, leaving Margaret and her older sister Joan in the guardianship of their uncle Philip of Namur.

After her mother died in 1204, and her father the next year, the now-orphaned Margaret and her sister remained under Philip of Namur's guardianship until he gave their wardship to King Philip II of France. During her time in Paris, she and her sister became familiar with the Cistercian Order, probably under influence of Blanche of Castile, the future Queen consort of France.

In 1211 Enguerrand III of Coucy offered the King the sum of 50,000 livres to marry Joan, while his brother Thomas would marry Margaret. However, the Flemish nobility was hostile to the project, which was finally dropped.

=== First marriage ===
After her sister's marriage with Infante Ferdinand of Portugal, Margaret was placed under the care of Bouchard of Avesnes, Lord of Etroen and a prominent Hainaut nobleman, who was knighted by Baldwin IX before he parted to the Crusades. In the middle of the war against France for the possession of the Artois and the forced territorial concession made by the Treaty of Pont-à-Vendin, Joan and Ferdinand wanted to marry Margaret with William II Longespée, heir of the Earldom of Salisbury, in order to reinforce the bonds of Flanders with England; however Bouchard of Avesnes, with the consent of the King of France, prevented the union.

In the presence of a significant number of bourgeois of Hainaut, she declared she did not want another husband than Bouchard, and before 23 July 1212 they were married. Margaret was then ten years old, while her new husband was twenty-eight.

19th century portrait of Mary by Albrecht De Vriendt

After the capture of Ferdinand of Portugal at the Battle of Bouvines (27 July 1214), Bouchard of Avesnes claimed to Joan in the name of his wife her share of their inheritance, which led Joan to attempt to get Margaret's marriage dissolved; in addition, the French King began to see Bouchard with suspicion because he fought in the Flemish army.

Philip II informed Pope Innocent III that before his wedding, Bouchard of Avesnes had already received holy orders as sub-deacon, so technically his union was illegal. In 1215, at the Fourth Council of the Lateran, the Pope annulled the marriage on this ground; however, Margaret and Bouchard refused to submit and they took refuge at the Castle of Houffalize in the Ardennes under the protection of Waleran, Count of Luxembourg. In the following four years, they had three sons:

- Baldwin of Avesnes (1217 – 1219), who died in infancy.
- John of Avesnes (1 May 1218 – 24 December 1257)
- Baldwin of Avesnes (September 1219 – 10 April 1295)

=== Second marriage ===
In 1219, in a battle against Joan, Bouchard of Avesnes was captured and imprisoned for two years, until 1221, when he was released on the condition that he separate from his wife and made a trip to Rome to get the absolution from the Pope. While he was in Rome to obtain forgiveness and the orders that would make his union legitimate, Joan took advantage of this to convince Margaret (who after Bouchard's capture came to live at her court, leaving her two sons in France under custody) to contract a new wedding. Finally, Margaret gave in to her sister's pressures, and between 18 August and 15 November 1223, she married William II of Dampierre, a nobleman from Champagne. They had five children:

- William II, Count of Flanders (1224 – 6 June 1251).
- Joan of Dampierre (c. 1225 – 1245/1246), married in 1239 to Hugh III of Rethel, then in 1243 to Theobald II, Count of Bar.
- Guy, Count of Flanders (c. 1226 – 7 March 1305).
- John of Dampierre (c. 1228 – 1258), Lord of Dampierre-sur-l'Aube, Sompuis and Saint-Dizier, Viscount of Troyes and Constable of Champagne.
- Marie of Dampierre (c. 1230 – 21 December 1302), Abbess of Flines, near Douai.

This situation caused something of a scandal, for the marriage was possibly bigamous, and violated the church's strictures on consanguinity as well. The disputes regarding the validity of the two marriages and the legitimacy of Margaret's children by each husband continued for decades, becoming entangled in the politics of the Holy Roman Empire and resulting in the long War of the Flemish Succession.

=== Countess of Flanders and Hainaut ===
At the death of her sister Joan in 1244, Margaret succeeded her as Countess of Flanders and Hainaut. Almost immediately, her sons from both marriages began the fight for the inheritance of the Counties, with the question of the validity of her first marriage to Bouchard of Avesnes was then raised, as if it was indeed illegitimate the inheritance of Flanders and Hainaut was passed only to the children from her second marriage, already favored by Margaret in 1245 when she paid homage to King Louis IX of France: at that point, she tried to obtain from the French King the recognition of William of Dampierre, the eldest son of her second marriage, as sole heir, arguing that Pope Gregory IX declared her first marriage invalid on 31 March 1237 and thus her sons from this union were illegitimate.

In 1246 Louis IX, acting as an arbitrator, gave the right to inherit Flanders to the Dampierre children, and the rights to Hainaut to the Avesnes children. This would seem to have settled the matter, but neither party accepted the solomonic decision of the French King, while responding to the spirit of fairness of the monarch, it had a political effect clearly advantageous for the interests of France, to dislocate the county, and served to avoid war. However, in 1248 John of Avesnes took advantage of the departure of Louis IX and William of Dampierre for the Crusades, to initiate war against his mother, taking Hainaut and Alost with other surrounding Flemish lands.

Margaret, thinking that the inheritance disputes were finally over after her son William of Dampierre paid homage for Flanders as her co-ruler to both Louis IX (in October 1246) and Emperor Frederick II (in 1248), made the political mistake of obtaining from the Pope, in 1251, the legitimation of both John and Baldwin of Avesnes; this gave them rights of birth over the Counties.

The unexpected death of William of Dampierre (6 June 1251) –who reportedly died from injuries received during a tournament, although his mother suspected that the allies of Avesnes were responsible– caused the renewal of the hostilities when John of Avesnes, who was uneasy about his rights, convinced William II of Holland, the German King recognized by the pro-papal forces, to seize Hainaut and the parts of Flanders which were within the bounds of the Holy Roman Empire. William II was theoretically, as King, overlord of these territories, and also John's brother-in-law. A civil war followed, which ended when the Avesnes forces defeated and imprisoned Guy of Dampierre (who had succeeded his brother as co-ruler of Flanders) at Westkappel, on the island of Walcheren, in July 1253.

Margaret offered the County of Hainaut to Charles of Anjou (brother of Louis IX) in order to obtain his military intervention against William II. Charles besieged Valenciennes, but a truce was negotiated between all parties on 26 July 1254, which included an agreement to submit the dispute to Louis IX for adjudication. Guy of Dampierre was ransomed in 1256 and Louis IX confirmed his 1246 decision regarding the Hainaut-Flanders split between the Avesnes and Dampierre children, while Charles of Anjou renounced to all his claims over Hainaut. The death of John of Avesnes in 1257 put a temporary halt over the already costly internecine quarrel.

The chronicler Matthew Paris called Margaret "...a new Medea guilty of the death of many honest knights". He related that after the capture of Guy and John of Dampierre at Westkappel, John of Avesnes sought to use them as hostages to force his mother to negotiate peace; supposedly, the harsh response of the Countess was:

Sacrifice them, truculent meat eater, and devour one of them cooked with pepper sauce and the other roasted with garlic.

Because the Avesnes heir, her grandson John II was still under-age, Margaret managed to recover the government of Hainaut, while in Flanders she remained co-ruler with her son Guy of Dampierre until 29 December 1278, when she abdicated in his favor. She administered Hainaut as solely ruling countess until May 1279, when she appointed John II as her co-ruler in Hainaut. She died nine months later, in February 1280. John II of Avesnes succeeded her as sole Count of Hainaut.

Margaret's death ended the personal union between Flanders and Hainaut, which had lasted for nearly a century. The two counties were reunited again only in 1432 when Jacqueline of Bavaria, the Avesnes heiress, surrendered her domains to Philip III, Duke of Burgundy, the Dampierre heir.

== Political role ==
=== Economy ===
Like her sister, Margaret conducted an economic policy designed to encourage international commerce. She removed restrictions on foreigner traders, despite pressures from local traders, who wanted to maintain monopolies. She also issued a new coinage. The huge debts that she contracted due to the War of Succession, however, forced Margaret to make concessions to the main Flemish cities, which became autonomous entities.

Her policies also helped to turn Bruges into an international port, granting privileges to the merchants of Poitou, Gascony and Castile, in addition to improvements in the water gates. During 1270-1275 she became involved in a trade war with England, probably the first time that the economy was openly used as a weapon in a conflict between states with unfavorable outcome. Margaret demanded from England payments for her support during the revolt of Simon de Montfort. King Henry III claimed that because he recruited mercenary soldiers, he did not see any reason to make payments.

In retaliation, Margaret seized the possessions of English merchants in Flanders. Henry III and later his son and successor Edward I seized those of Flemish merchants in England and also stopped the exports of wool to Flanders. Townspeople who depended on the textile trade pressured the Countess and her son Guy to enter into negotiations with the English; henceforth the Flemish no longer dominated the transport of goods between the continent and England.

=== Religion ===
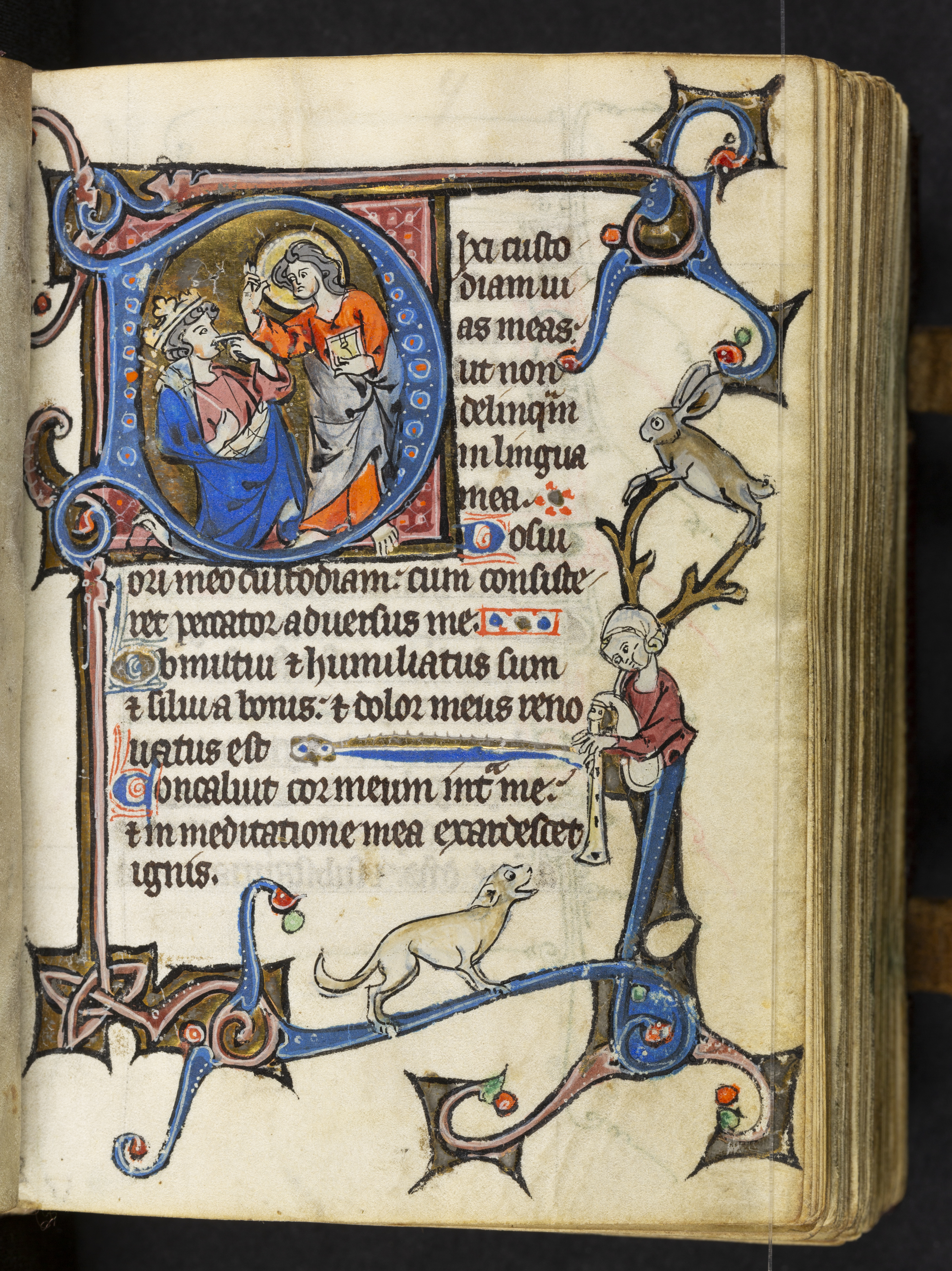
The personal psalter of Margaretha II of Flanders; illuminated by the Dampierre Masters, Flanders/Artois, ca. 1250-1280 (Bruges Public Library, Ms. 820 Collection of the Flemish Community)

Like her sister, Margaret supported and founded religious houses. In 1245, she founded the Béguinage in Bruges. She also had an interest in architecture and patronized writers and poets. In 1260 she founded the Abbey of Saint Elizabeth du Quesnoy, now destroyed.

Closely related to the Dominican Order during her stay in Valenciennes after her marital separation, Margaret founded convents of this order in Ypres and Douai.

== Ancestry ==
8. Baldwin IV, Count of Hainaut
4. Baldwin V, Count of Hainaut & VII of Flanders
9. Alice of Namur
2. Baldwin I, Latin Emperor
10. Theodoric, Count of Flanders
5. Margaret I, Countess of Flanders
11. Sybilla of Anjou
1. Margaret II, Countess of Flanders
12. Theobald II of Champagne
6. Henry I of Champagne
13. Matilda of Carinthia
3. Marie of Champagne
14. Louis VII of France
7. Marie of France
15. Eleanor of Aquitaine

== Sources ==
- Shahar, S. (1997). Growing Old in the Middle Ages: 'Winter Clothes us in Shadow and Pain'. Routledge.
- Wheeler, B. & Parsons, J. (2002). Eleanor of Aquitaine: Lord and Lady. Palgrave Macmillan.
- Nicholas, David. (1992). Medieval Flanders. Longman Group UK Limited, London.
- Pollock, M.A. (2015). Scotland, England and France after the loss of Normandy, 1204-1296. The Boydell Press.
- Lester, Anne E. (2011). Creating Cistercian Nuns: The Women's Religious Movement and Its Reform in Thirteenth Century Champagne. Cornell University Press.
- Welkenhuysen, A. (1975). Lourdaux, W.; Verhelst, D.; Welkenhuysen, A.; Van den Auweele, D. (eds.). Aspects of the Medieval Animal Epic. Katholieke Universiteit Leuven Press.
- Lottin, Alain. Histoire des provinces françaises du nord, Westhoek-Editions, 1989, ISBN 2-87789-004-X.
- Van Hasselt, André and Van Hasselt, M. Historia de Béljica y Holanda (in Spanish), Barcelona, Imprenta del Imparcial, 1884.
- Wade Labarge, Margaret. La mujer en la Edad Media (in Spanish), Madrid, Ed. Nerea, 1988, ISBN 84-89569-88-6.
- Kerrebrouck, P. Van. Les Capétiens 987-1328, Villeneuve d'Asq, 2000.

Margaret II of Flanders House of Flanders Born: 2 June 1202 Died: 10 February 1280
Preceded by Joan	Countess of Flanders; 1244–1278	Succeeded by Guy
Preceded by Joan	Countess of Hainaut; 1244–1253	Succeeded by John I
Preceded by John I	Countess of Hainaut; 1257–1280	Succeeded by John II
