= Jean de Le Mote =

Start of Le Parfait du paon in BnF, Fr. 12565

Start of Li Regret de Guillaume le conte de Haynnau in BnF. NAF 7514

Jean de Le Mote (fl. 1326–1350) was an Old French poet and musical composer from the County of Hainaut.

Le Mote was a native speaker of Picard or Walloon, as the spelling of his surname indicates, since le is feminine in those dialects. He is, however, probably the same person as the Jehan de La Mote who worked as a scribe in the chancery of Hainaut according to the registers of 1325–1326. He may have hailed from Ghent, if he is the person of the same name to whom King Edward III of England granted an annuity of 20 pounds in 1338. He was probably connected to the English court through Edward's wife since 1328, Philippa of Hainaut. He was still living in 1350, when Gilles Li Muisis praised him in his Méditations as one of the four greatest living poets.

Le Mote wrote three known long poems:

- Li Regret de Guillaume le conte de Haynnau (1339), an elegy on the death of Count William I of Hainaut (1337), father of Queen Philippa
- Voie d'Enfer et de Paradis (1340), a moral and didactic work
- Le Parfait du paon (1340), a continuation of Restor du paon, itself a continuation of Vœux du paon, which belonged to the tradition of legends about Alexander the Great. Le Mote wrote it for his patron, Simon de Lille. He incorporated eight ballades he had composed earlier and separately at laisses 28–56. These ballades are a valuable source of information about the puys (poetic societies) of northern France and the Low Countries. Le Parfait survives in two manuscripts, in each following a copy of Restor.

He also wrote at least one known short poem:

- O Victriens, mondains Dieu d'armonie, one half of an exchange of poems with Philippe de Vitry, in which he responds to criticism of his service in England

Silvère Menegaldo argues for Le Mote as a transitional figure between itinerant minstrel (trouvère) for whom poetry and music were inextricable and the more literary "professional courtier-poet".

== Bibliography ==
- Carey, Richard J., ed. (2017) [1972]. Jean de la Mote, Le Parfait du paon: Édition critique. University of North Carolina Press.
- Diekstra, F. N. M. (1986). "The Poetic Exchange Between Philippe de Vitry and Jean de le Mote: A New Edition". Neophilologus. 70 (4): 504–519. doi:10.1007/BF02001206.
- Menegaldo, Silvère (2015). Le dernier ménestrel? Jean de Le Mote, une poétique en transition (autour de 1340). Librairie Droz.
- Plumley, Yolanda (2013). The Art of Grafted Song: Citation and Allusion in the Age of Machaut. Oxford University Press.
- Plumley, Yolanda (2017). "Review of Menegaldo 2015". French Studies. 71 (1): 100–101. doi:10.1093/fs/knw296.
- Reaney, Gilbert (1956). "A Postscript to 'The Manuscript Chantilly, Musee Conde 1047'". Musica Disciplina. 10: 55–59. JSTOR 40468213.
- Rouse, Mary A.; Rouse, Richard H. (1997). "The Goldsmith and the Peacocks: Jean de le Mote in the Household of Simon de Lille, 1340". Viator. 28: 281–304.
