= Theobald II of Lorraine =

Duke of Lorraine from 1303 to 1312

Theobald II
- Duke of Lorraine
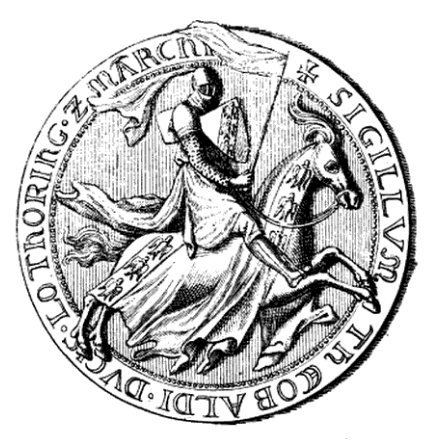
- Seal of Theobald II
- Born: 1263
- Died: 13 May 1312
- Burial: Beaupre
- Spouse: Isabelle of Rumigny
- Issue More...: Frederick IV, Duke of Lorraine
- House: House of Lorraine
- Father: Frederick III, Duke of Lorraine
- Mother: Margaret of Navarre

Theobald II (French: Thiébaud or Thiébaut; 1263 – 13 May 1312) was the Duke of Lorraine from 1303 until his death in 1312. He was the son and successor of Frederick III and Margaret, daughter of King Theobald I of Navarre of the Royal House of Blois.

== Life ==
In 1298, he took part in the Battle of Göllheim, near Speyer, in which the king of Germany, Adolph, was killed fighting his rival, Albert of Habsburg. Theobald was on Albert' side, despite the history of support for the legitimate emperors (which Adolph aspired to be) in the history of his family.

In 1302, Theobald and his son, Frederick, were supporting Philip IV of France, at the Battle of the Golden Spurs at Kortrijk, where the Flemings defeated the French chivalry under Robert II of Artois. He was present also at the Battle of Mons-en-Pévèle in 1304, where the French king personally led the army in a less decisive battle. He, along with John II, Duke of Brabant, and Amadeus V, Count of Savoy, were sent to negotiate peace with Flanders.

In 1305, he was at Lyon, at the crowning of Pope Clement V. When Clement imposed a tax, a tenth-part, on the clergy and charged the duke to collect it, Theobald successfully met the opposition of Renaud de Bar, bishop of Metz.

== Family ==
A contract for the marriage of Theobald II, Duke of Lorraine and Isabel de Rumigny was signed in April 1270. On 23 May 1278, he married Isabelle, lady of Rumigny (b. 1263 – d. 1326), daughter of Hugh, lord of Rumigny, and Philippine d'Oulche. They had:

- Frederick (b. 15 April 1282 - d. 21 April 1329), his successor in Lorraine.
- Matthias (died c. 1330), lord of Darney, Boves, Blainville, and Florennes, married Mathilde of Flanders.
- Hugh (d. after 20 March 1337), his successor in Rumigny, Martigny, and Aubenton.
- Mary (d. after 1344), married (1324) Guy de Châtillon (died 1362), lord of Fère-en-Tardenois and had one child.
- Margaret (d. 1348), married (c. 1311) Guy de Dampierre, count of Zeeland and later married (1313) Louis IV, de Looz & Chiny.
- Isabella (died 1353), married Érard de Bar (died 1337), lord of Pierrepont and had six children.
- Philippine, nun

== See also ==
- Dukes of Lorraine family tree

== Sources ==
- Bogdan, Henry (2013). La Lorraine des ducs (in French). Perrin.
- Verbruggen, J. F. (2001). DeVries, Kelly (ed.). The Battle of the Golden Spurs (Courtrai, 11 July 1302): A Contribution to the History of Flander's War of Liberation, 1297-1305. Translated by Ferguson, David Richard. Boydell Press.

Preceded by Frederick III	Duke of Lorraine; 1303–1312	Succeeded by Frederick IV
