= Barony of Vaud =

European polity

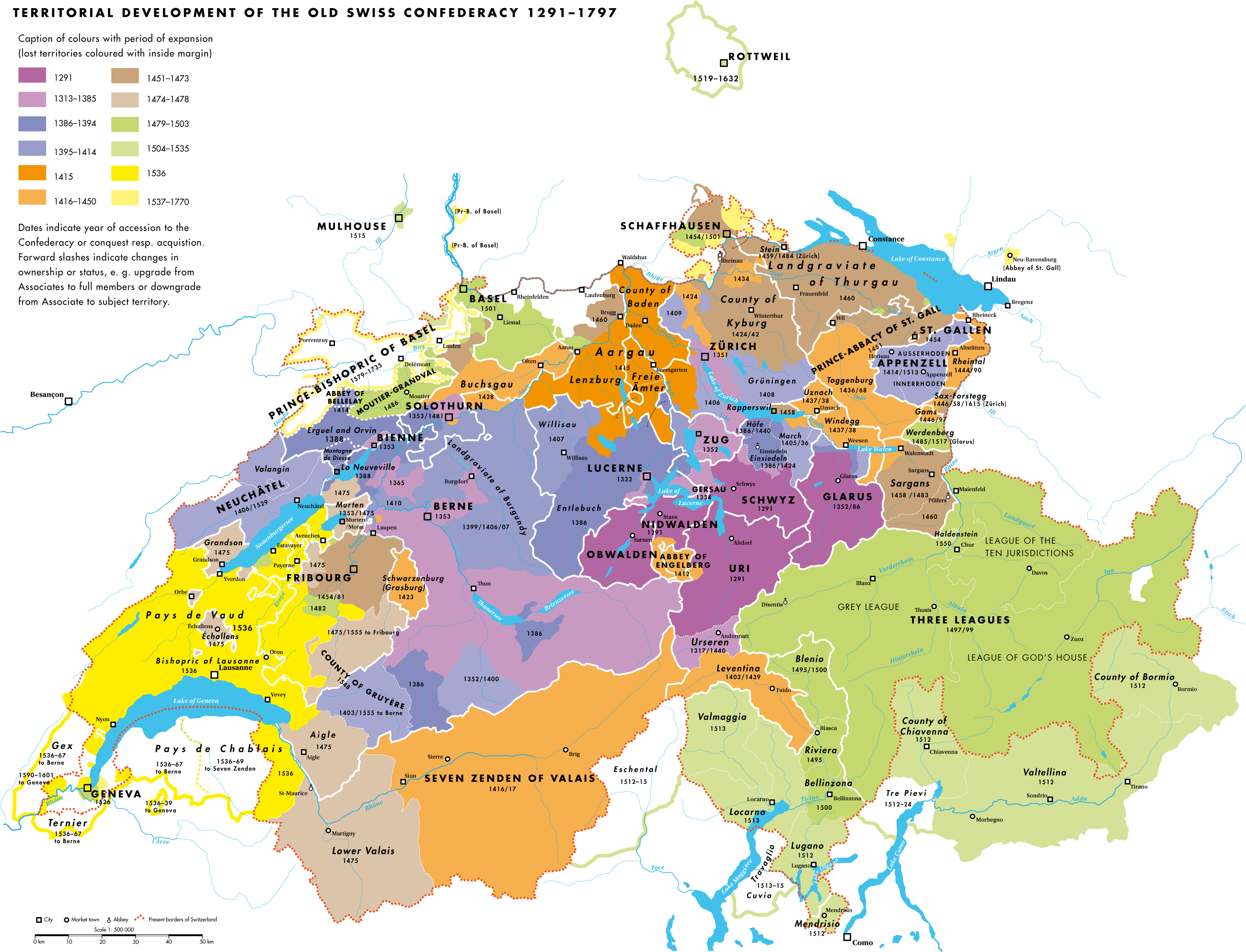
Map of the territorial development of Switzerland, showing the pays de Vaud in yellow (lower left).

The Barony of Vaud was an appanage of the County of Savoy, corresponding roughly to the modern Canton of Vaud in Switzerland. It was created by a process of acquisition on the part of a younger brother of the reigning count beginning in 1234 and culminated in the formalisation of its relationship to the county in 1286. It was semi-independent state, capable of entering into relations with its sovereign, the Holy Roman Emperor (as in 1284), and of fighting alongside the French in the Hundred Years' War. It ceased to exist when it was bought by the count in 1359. It was then integrated into the Savoyard state, where the title Baron of Vaud (Italian barone di Vaud) remained a subsidiary title of the heads of the family at least as late as the reign of Charles Albert of Sardinia, although the territory of the barony was annexed by the Canton of Bern during the Protestant Reformation (1536).

== Geography and economy ==
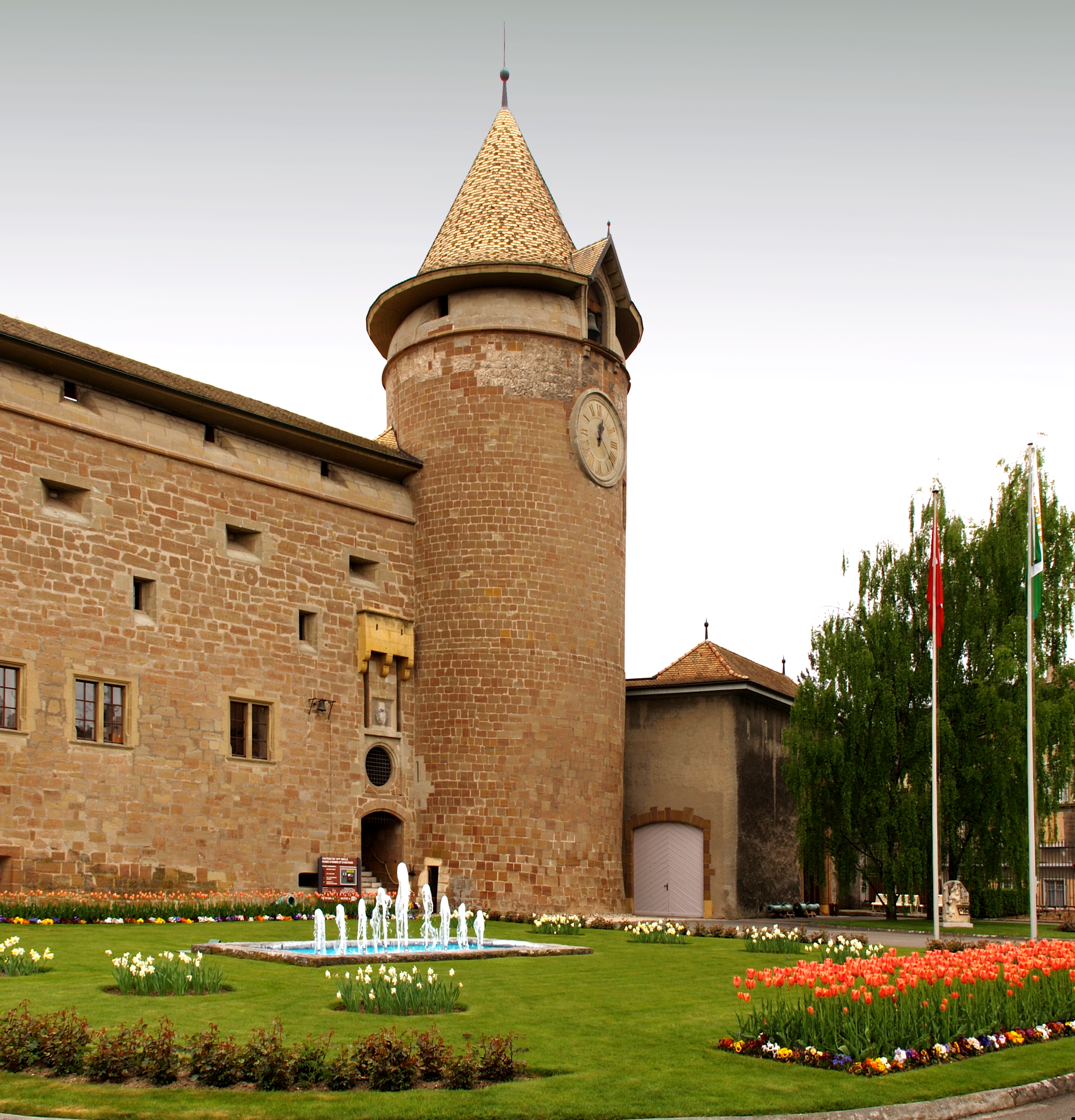
Castle at Morges, seat of baronial administration

The pays de Vaud at the time of its purchase by the Count of Savoy in 1359 comprised fertile farmland probably yielding more revenues annually than the neighbouring County of Geneva. It lay between the lakes Geneva and Neuchâtel, and between Lausanne, which was the seat of the Bishop of Lausanne, to the west and Bern, which was a self-governing commune, to the east. It lay on important trade routes leading from the Alpine passes of the Great St Bernard and Simplon along its lakeside paths northwards into Germany and westward into France.

The appanage of Vaud that was formally ceded to the younger brother of the count in January 1286 was a fief of the count owing liege homage. A few lords of the pays de Vaud remained liege vassals of the count and their lands were not a part of the barony of Vaud. These were the Count of Gruyère and the lords of Châtel and Cossonay. Politically, the barony of Vaud was divided into ten castellanies centred on Nyon, Rolle, Morges (which was the baronial capital, where homage was received and the administration overseen), Moudon (which was the first Savoyard acquisition in the region in 1207), Estavayer, Romont, Rue, Yverdon, Les Clées, and Vaulruz.

The feudal obligations owed by the baron of Vaud are evidenced by the participation of 160 men-at-arms (gentes armorum), who were mounted and fully armoured, and 2,500 infantrymen, all of whom were pledged to serve at least twenty-two days in the campaign of the spring of 1352 against the pays de Gex. When the barony was ruled by a baroness, who was not therefore a banneret entitled to lead troops in battle under his own banner, the men-at-arms of Vaud fought under their bailli. In the spring of 1355, when the Count of Savoy was invading the Barony of Faucigny, the baroness of Vaud provided 122 men-at-arms under her bailli, Jean de Blonay, and another seventeen under his lieutenant, Arnaud d'Aigrement.

== History ==
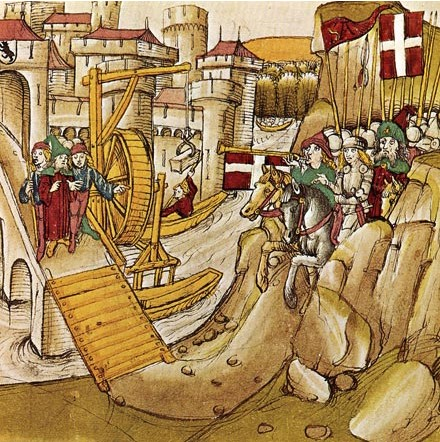
Peter, first Savoyard ruler of Vaud, extended his protection as far as Bern, where he is shown here greeting the citizens after their construction of a new bridge over the Aar.

In the settlement of the succession to Savoy, following the death of Thomas I (1233), the first Savoyard count to expand his lordship into the pays de Vaud, the lands in the Vaud went to Peter le Petit Charlemagne in 1234, who later became Count of Savoy (1263–68). It was he who brought most of the Vaud into the Savoyard ambit, by diplomacy and war, with the aid of English money supplied by his nephew-in-law Henry III. Peter willed his barony of Vaud to his daughter, Beatrice, but she never enjoyed it. In 1271 her uncle, Count Philip I, forced her to concede the pays de Vaud to him, partly through the intervention of Edmund Crouchback, who was travelling through the region to join the Ninth Crusade. In the summer of 1272, Philip's possession of Vaud was limited to the duration of his life, to return to her upon his death (although this was later ignored).

Because of his dispute with King Rudolf concerning the Vaud and other Swiss regions, Philip granted it to his nephew Louis, who by September 1281 was receiving the homage of the vassals of the region. In May 1284 Louis's position was confirmed by Rudolf, who granted him the right to mint coin within the pays de Vaud. Another settlement was needed following the death of Philip I in 1285. Savoy fell to Louis's brother Amadeus V, who was forced to recognise Louis's possession of all the territories in the pays de Vaud formerly held by Count Peter (1286).

Louis passed the barony on to his son and namesake Louis II upon his death. Louis II's only son died at the battle of Laupen in 1339 and his heir became his eldest daughter Catherine. She succeeded him, and appears to have ruled with the help of her widowed mother, Isabelle de Chalon-Arlay, although she was also often absent in her husband's domains. When Catherine became pregnant in 1353 after her marriage to her third husband, the then Count of Savoy, Amadeus VI, offered to buy the barony from her and her husband in order to prevent it from falling into the hands of another dynasty. The final contract of sale signed on 19 June 1359 initiated the definitive integration of the magna baronia ("great barony") into the County of Savoy, at the price of 160,000 florins. At the time the barony owed large debts. The title Baron of Vaud is constantly attached to the counts, later dukes, of Savoy and afterwards the kings of Sardinia and Italy.

In 1465, Jacques of Savoy obtained the barony and country of Vaud with the title of Lord of Vaud from his brother, Duke Amadeus IX of Savoy. In 1476, the Vaud returned to the direct domain of the dukes of Savoy until 1536 when it was conquered by the Canton of Bern and incorporated into the Old Swiss Confederacy. It became a canton of its own in 1803, during the Napoleonic Wars.

== List of barons ==
All the barons belonged to the House of Savoy.

- Peter (1234–68), also Count of Savoy from 1263
- Beatrice (1268–71, died 1310)
  - Guigues (1268–70), her husband
- Philip I (1271–81, died 1285), also Count of Savoy from 1268
- Louis I (1281–1302)
- Louis II (1302–49)
- Catherine (1349–59, died 1388)
  - Raoul (1349–50), her husband
  - William (1352–59, died 1391), her husband
- Attached to Savoy from 1359 to 1465.
  - Amadeus I (1359–83)
  - Amadeus II (1383–91)
  - Amadeus III (1391–1440), with Bonne of Bourbon and Bonne of Berry as regents (1391–98)
  - Louis III (1440–65)
- Jacques (1465–76)
- Attached to Savoy from 1476 to 1536.
  - Philibert I (1476–82), with Yolande of Valois as regent (1476–78)
  - Charles I (1482–90)
  - Charles II (1490–96), with Blanche of Montferrat as regent (1490–96)
  - Philip II (1496–97)
  - Philibert II (1497–1504)
  - Charles III (1504–36)
- Attached to Bern and Switzerland from 1536.
