= John III of Namur =

Marquis of Namur

John III, Marquis of Namur
- Died: 10 March 1429
- Noble family: House of Dampierre
- Father: William I, Marquis of Namur
- Mother: Catherine of Savoy

John III (died 10 March 1429) was between 1418 and 1429 the last independent Marquis of Namur.

He was the youngest son of William I, Marquis of Namur and Catherine of Savoy († 1388), daughter of Louis II of Savoy, baron of Vaud, and Isabella of Châlon.
When his father died in 1391, he inherited Wijnendale and Ronse.

== Reign ==
John succeeded his elder brother William II as Marquis of Namur, when William died without children in 1418.

John never married, but had an illegitimate son with his cousin Cécile of Savoy: Philip of Namur, seigneur de Dhuy (died 1449).

John III led a very luxurious life, and he had to raise taxes to finance his expenses. This led to revolts and high debts, which forced John to sell his County to Philip the Good, Duke of Burgundy (23 April 1421) for 30.000 golden crowns and the clause that he could benefit from the usufruct of his former county. Philip the Good incorporated Namur into the Burgundian Netherlands, thus ending the existence of an independent County of Namur.

== Notes ==
John III of Namur House of Dampierre Died: 10 March 1429
| Preceded by William II | Marquis of Namur; 1418–1429 | Succeeded by Philip the Good |
