= William II of Namur =

William II, Marquis of Namur
- Born: 22 January 1355
- Died: 10 January 1418 (aged 62)
- Noble family: House of Dampierre
- Spouses: Marie de Bar; Jeanne d'Harcourt
- Father: William I, Marquis of Namur
- Mother: Catherine of Savoy

William II, Marquis of Namur (22 January 1355 – 10 January 1418) inherited the Marquisate of Namur from his father William I in 1391 and held it until his own death. His mother was Catherine of Savoy († 1388), daughter of Louis II of Savoy, baron of Vaud, and Isabella of Châlon.

== Reign ==
His rule as marquis of Namur was a peaceful one in which he devoted himself to encouraging commerce, industry, and the building of fortifications. He did participate in 1408 in the suppression of a revolt by the people of Liège, together with John the Fearless, Duke of Burgundy, William IV, Count of Hainaut and Louis VII, Duke of Bavaria.

== Marriages ==
His first wife was Marie de Bar, daughter of Robert I, Duke of Bar and Marie of France, Duchess of Bar.

In 1393, he remarried Jeanne d'Harcourt (1372–1456), daughter of John VI, Count of Harcourt and Catherine of Bourbon.

He had no surviving children, and so on his death, William II was succeeded as Marquis by his brother John III.

William II of Namur House of Dampierre Born: 22 January 1355 Died: 10 January 1418
Preceded by William I	Marquis of Namur; 1391–1418	Succeeded by John III
