= Rutten, Belgium =

Rutten Russon
- Village and former municipality
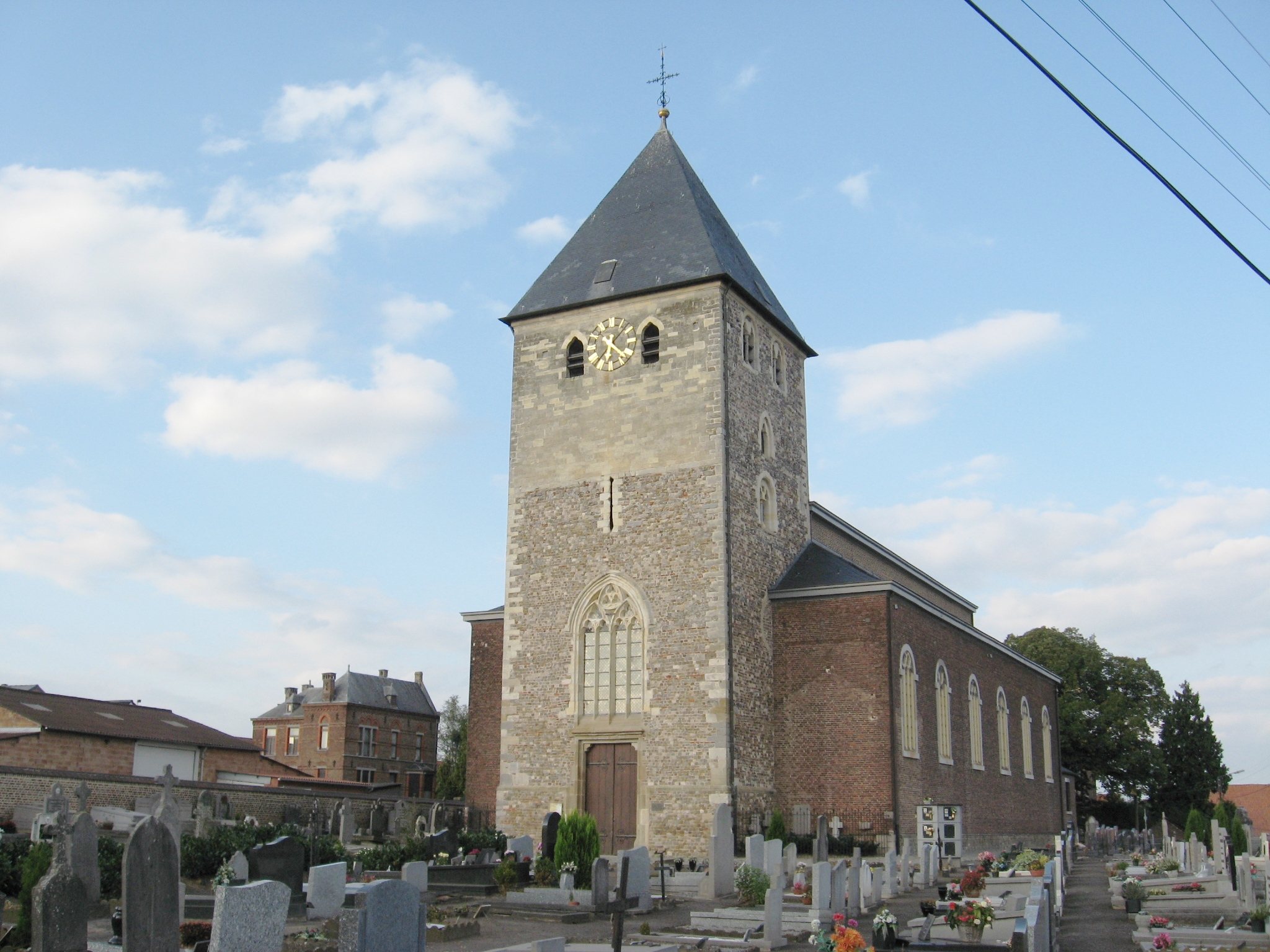

- Location in Belgium
- Coordinates: 50°44′51″N 5°26′34″E
- Country: Belgium
- Region: Flanders
- Province: Limburg
- Arrondissement: Tongeren
- Municipality: Tongeren

Area
  - Total: 10.87 km^{2} (4.20 sq mi)

Population (2021)
  - Total: 838
  - Density: 77.1/km^{2} (200/sq mi)
- Time zone: CET

Rutten (French: Russon) is a village in the Tongeren municipality of the Limburg province in the Flemish Community of Belgium. The village is located in the Haspengouw region, and was a separate municipality until its merger into Tongeren in 1977.

== History ==
The village was mentioned as Riuti in 1065. The area had been inhabited since prehistory, and two tumuli and several Roman villas have been discovered. In 1408, the Battle of Othée between the Prince-Bishop of Liège and the citizens of Liège, took place near the village.

After the conquest of Maastricht in 1632 by the Dutch Republic, Rutten was one of the redemptiedorpen (redemptive villages) who remained independent by paying taxes to both the Dutch Republic and the Duchy of Brabant. In 1785, the village officially became part of the Netherlands by the Treaty of Fontainebleau. In 1843, the right bank of the Meuse became Belgian Limburg by the Treaty of Maastricht, and from then on Rutten was a Belgian village. In 1977, the municipality of Rutten merged into Tongeren.

== Sights ==
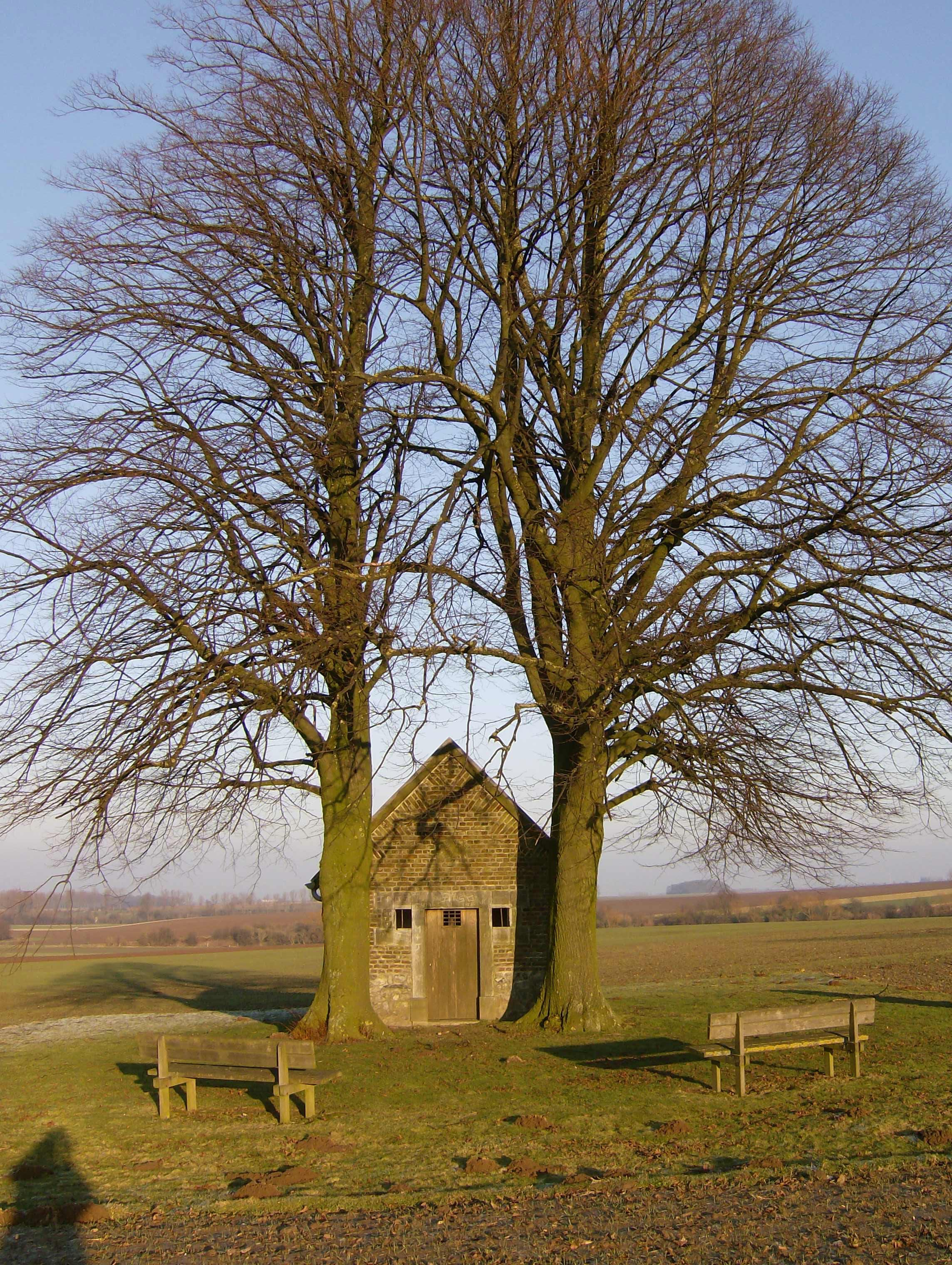
The Holy Cottage

The Hamal Castle is located near Rutten, and was home to the lord of the village. The castle was first mentioned in 1214. The current castle dates from the late 18th century.

The Holy Cottage (Dutch: Heilig Huisje) is located on a hill near Rutten with a view on the village and the Basilica of Tongeren. It is a chapel dedicated to the Battle of Othée, and dates back to the 15th century. The current chapel dates from the 18th century.

Rutten's townscape is protected by the Flemish regional government.

== Events ==
On 1 May the Saint Evermarus Festivities are held. The festivities remember the murder of the pilgrim Evermarus in 968 by the knight Hacco in Rutten. First there is a procession followed by a re-enactment of the murder in which the audience is supposed to play along.
