= Kettle War =

1784 military incident in Europe

- Part of the Patriottentijd
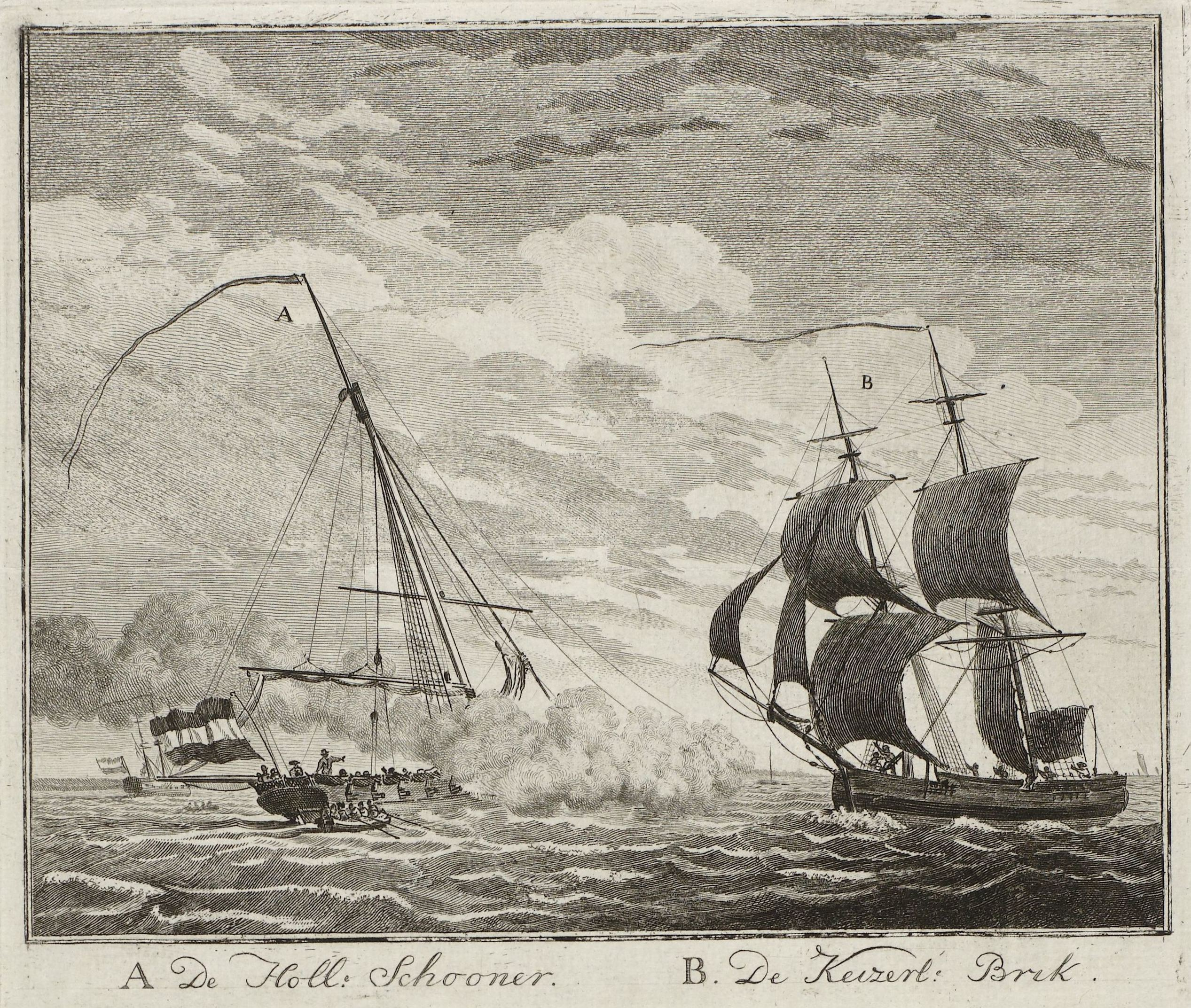
- A lithograph of the engagement between Dolfijn and Le Louis
Date	8 October 1784
Location	River Scheldt
Result	Treaty of Fontainebleau
Territorial changes	Status quo ante bellum

Belligerents
Austria	Dutch Republic

Commanders and leaders
Joseph II	William V

Strength
2 warships 1 merchant ship	1 warship

Casualties and losses
1 merchant ship captured	None

The Kettle War (Dutch: Keteloorlog or Marmietenoorlog) was a military confrontation between the forces of both the Habsburg monarchy and the Republic of the Seven Netherlands on 8 October 1784. It was named the Kettle War because the only shot fired hit a soup kettle.

== Background ==
After the Dutch Revolt, the northern Netherlands formed their own republic, while the southern Netherlands remained with Spain. Since 1585, the northern Netherlands had closed off the Scheldt, so that the harbours of Antwerp and Ghent could not be reached by trade ships, and this remained so after the revolt. This gave an enormous impulse to the economy of the northern Netherlands (namely Amsterdam), but the southern cities were dislodged from their important trading position. The closure of the Scheldt was confirmed by the Peace of Westphalia in 1648, to which the Spanish agreed. After the War of the Spanish Succession, the Spanish Netherlands had been ceded to Austria by the Treaty of Rastatt in 1714.

Since Europe's "Diplomatic Revolution" of 1756, Austria, and thus the Austrian Netherlands, had been in an alliance with France. Prussia, France's former ally, entered into an alliance with Britain. The change, sensational at the time, made nonsense of all the strategic assumptions and plans, current since 1713, based on the premises that the southern Netherlands would serve as a barrier between the Dutch Republic and France and that the Republic's security depended on close ties with Austria and Britain. It was a shift which undoubtedly made it ever more attractive for the Dutch to remain neutral in any conflicts between both Britain and France, and Austria and Prussia.

== War ==
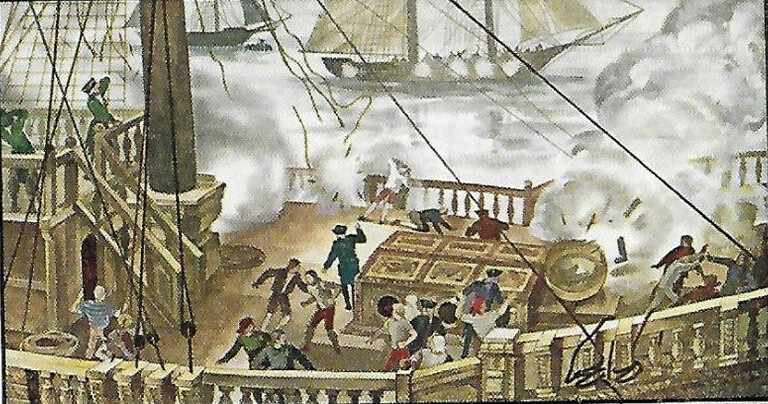
19th-century depiction of the broadside of the Dolfijn

In 1781 Joseph II, Holy Roman Emperor, taking advantage of the ongoing Fourth Anglo-Dutch War, demanded the final dismantling of the Barrier system, and in 1784, he demanded the return of territory in the Overmaas and States Flanders (roughly current-day Zeelandic Flanders), as well as Dutch evacuation of Maastricht and the reopening of the Scheldt. This happened shortly after the Treaty of Paris. Although the Habsburg army in that region was not equipped very well, with a lack of artillery and supply, the emperor decided to threaten war with the Dutch. Convinced that the Netherlands would not dare react, Joseph II had three ships (including the merchant ship Le Louis with the emperor's flag) sail from Antwerp for the Scheldt.

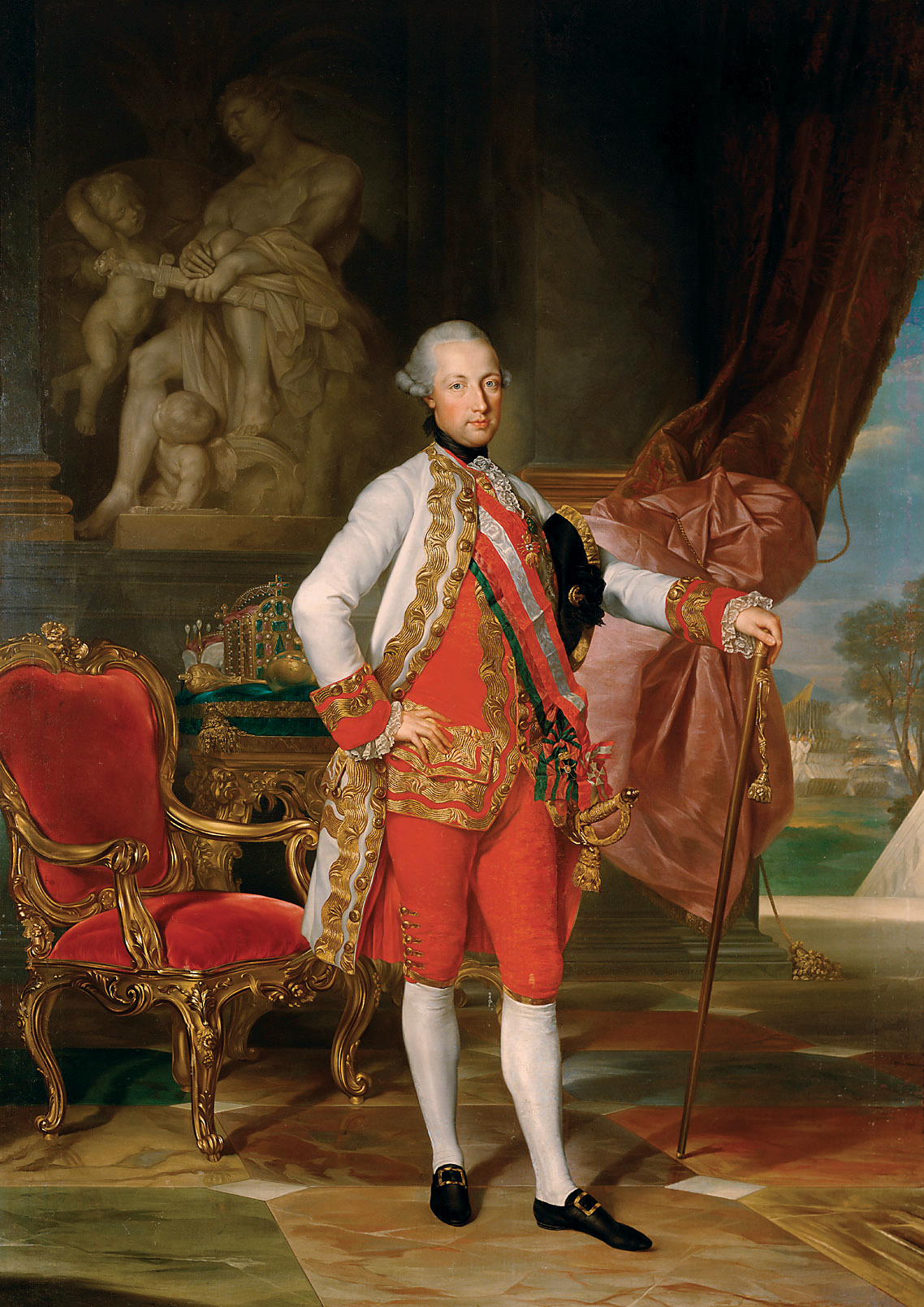
A portrait of Joseph II, Holy Roman Emperor, by Anton von Maron

On 9 October 1784, as a letter to Benjamin Franklin asserts, the war seemed inevitable. That day, the Dutch ship the Dolfijn was sent out to intercept the Imperial ships. After only one shot, which hit a kettle, Le Louis surrendered. On 30 October, the emperor declared war. On 18 November, the States of Holland reacted: the Count of Salm was asked to form a small army. The Patriots used the incident for political propaganda and organized the Exercitiegenootschappen militia all over the country. The Admiralty of Friesland offered two new warships, but they were unable to leave the port of Harlingen and were dismantled.

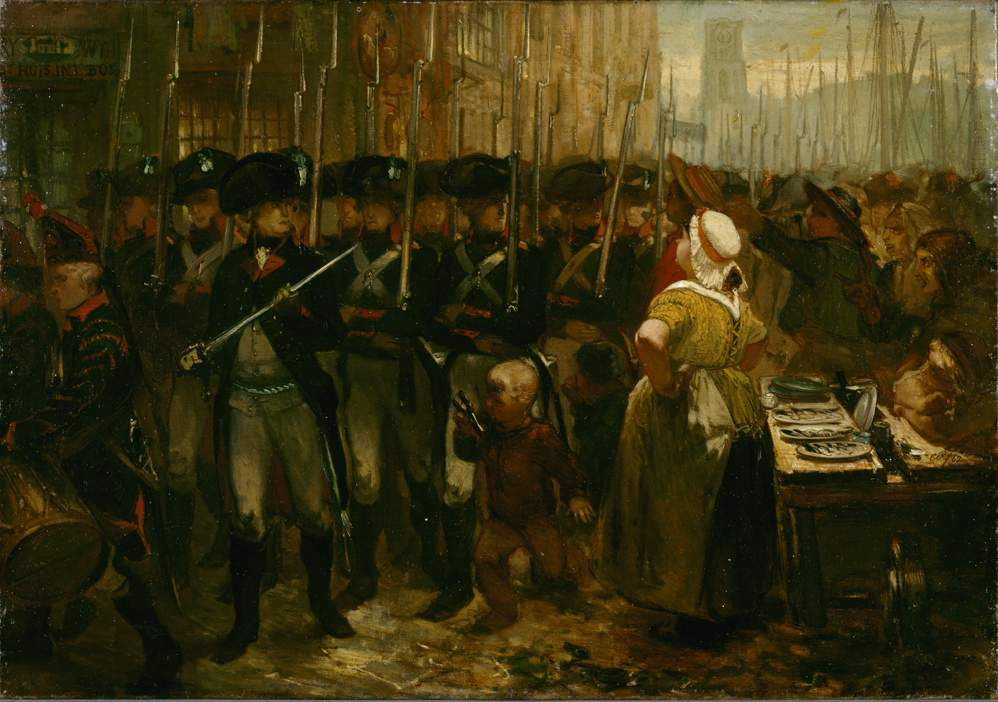
The Patriot militia of Captain Elsevier

According to the Annual Register for the years 1784–85, Dolfijn would have needed a full broadside of seven guns to stop Le Louis. Austrian forces invaded Dutch territory, razed a custom station and strongly occupied the old Fort Lillo, at the time used as a vegetable garden.

The garrison of Lillo broke the dikes, inundating a large area and drowning many people.

On 13 February 1785, the Dutch ambassador Van Berckel wrote an extended letter to John Jay, in which he explained the situation.

== Aftermath ==
As a consequence of this short skirmish, and under the mediation of France, negotiations were reopened between the Dutch Republic and the Holy Roman Empire. This led in 1785 to the Treaty of Fontainebleau. It was decided that the Scheldt would remain closed to shipping, but that the southern Netherlands would be compensated for this by the Republic. At a rough estimate, the Republic paid 2 million guilder (according to other sources 10 million guilder). Much later on, definitive agreements were made between Belgium and the Netherlands about accessing the Scheldt. The war contributed to the decline and fall of Duke Louis Ernest of Brunswick-Lüneburg, advisor to the Dutch stadtholder, who was accused of favouring the enemy due to his familial ties to Joseph II.
