= Battle of Othée =

1408 battle in Europe

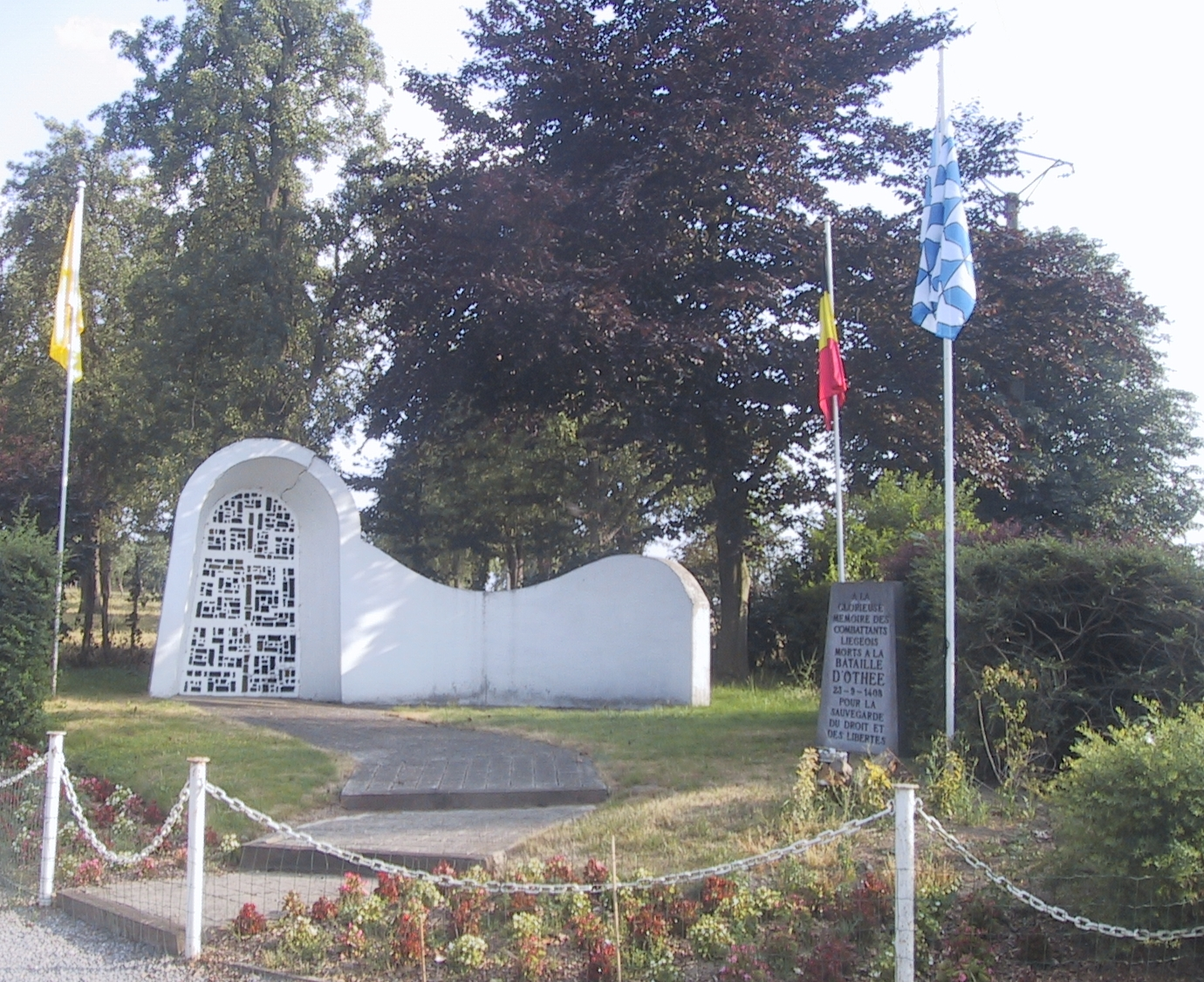
- Monument of the Battle of Othée
Date	23 September 1408
Location	Othée, sub-municipality of Awans (present-day Belgium)
Result	Burgundian victory

Belligerents
Burgundian State; County of Hainaut; County of Namur	People of Liège

Commanders and leaders
John the Fearless; William VI of Hainaut; William II of Namur	Henry of Horne

Strength
5,000–6,500	6,000–8,500

Casualties and losses
Low	3,000–4,000 on the battlefield

The Battle of Othée was fought between the citizens of Liège and a professional army under command of John the Fearless on 23 September 1408. The militia of Liège suffered a heavy defeat.

== Cause ==
In 1390, John of Bavaria, youngest son of Duke Albert I, Duke of Bavaria only aged 17, had become Prince-Bishop of Liège, with the support of Pope Boniface IX. His rule was a disaster. His authoritarian style clashed with the nobles and burghers of the Prince-Bishopric, who had acquired a certain degree of liberty over the years. He had already been expelled several times, when a new conflict in 1408 made him flee to Maastricht. Henry of Horne, Lord of Perwez was proclaimed Mambour and his son Prince-Bishop. John of Bavaria turned for help to his powerful family.

John's brother was William VI of Hainaut and his brother-in-law John the Fearless of Burgundy. Together with William II, Marquis of Namur, they raised an army and marched against the citizens of Liège.

Henri of Horne was aware that his troops were no match for the professional army heading his way, and therefore proposed to leave the city and start a guerilla war from the countryside. This was refused by the hait-droits, the most radical part of the rebels.

== The battle ==
The rebels marched towards the enemy and took up position on a little hill in open field between the villages of Othée, Rutten, and Herstappe. To face them Duke John decided upon a tactical plan that mimicked the winning English system during the Hundred Years' War. His main battle of men-at-arms stood dismounted in the center flanked by 2,000 archers, while 400 other men-at-arms and 1,000 light horsemen remained mounted in reserve. Despite the bravery of the rebels attack they were repulsed by the ferocious Burgundian archery and then surrounded by the Duke's reserve cavalry and cut to pieces. On the orders of the Duke, no mercy was given. Henri of Horne, his son, and most of the nobles were amongst the dead. After this the battle ended.

== Aftermath ==
John of Bavaria returned from Maastricht and started a brutal repression on the city. The ensuing executions of leading insurgents and their families, including the widow of Henry of Horne, led to John of Bavaria's nickname "the Pitiless." Burgundian influence was extended over the city and over the bishopric of Liège.

== Sources ==
- Schnerb, Bernard (1989). "La Bataille Rangee dans la Tactique des Armees Bourguignonnes au Debut du 15e siecle: Essai de Synthese". Annales de Bourgogne. LXI (241 (Janvier-Mar)): 5–32.
- Villalon, L. J. Andrew; Kagay, Donald J., eds. (2008). The Hundred Years War (Part II): Different Vistas. Brill.
- Villalon, L. J. Andrew; Kagay, Donald J., eds. (2013). The Hundred Years War (Part III): Further Considerations. Brill.
- Sumption, Jonathan (2011). The Hundred Years War III: Divided Houses. London: Faber & Faber. ISBN 978-0-571-13897-5.
- Richard, Vaughan (2002). John the Fearless. Woodbridge, Suffolk: Boydell. p. 49–66. ISBN 0-85115-916-8.
