= Redemptiedorpen =

Coordinates: 50.754°N 5.443°E

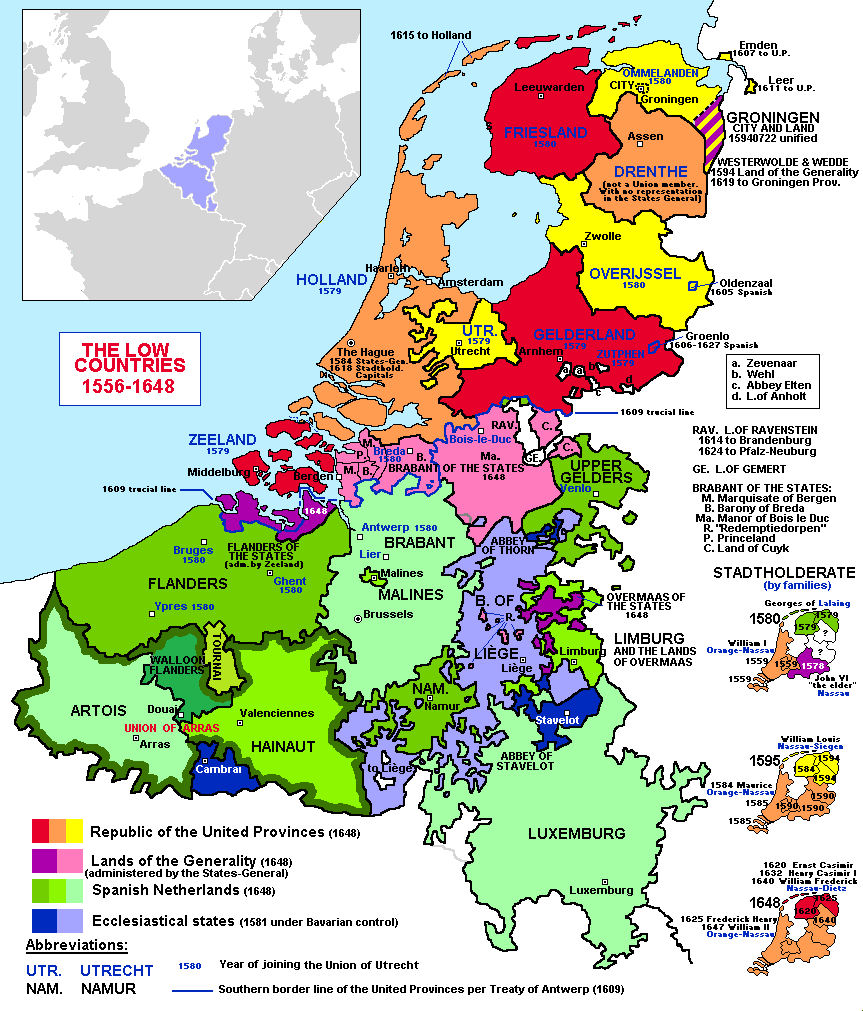

The Redemptiedorpen (lit. 'redemption thorps'; French: Terres de rédemption) are a group of small villages north of Liège, Belgium. Their ownership was disputed between the United Provinces and the Habsburg Netherlands since the 17th century. The areas retained independence, with the condition that they pay taxes to both powers. In practice, they were closely linked to the tweeherigheid of Maastricht.

The villages were Falaise, Hermalle and Paifve in the current Belgian Liège Province and Hoepertingen, Mopertingen, Nederheim, Rutten and Veulen in the current Belgian province of Limburg.

The Treaty of Fontainebleau in 1785 might have proposed an exchange of territories so that these areas would be absorbed, but protests from Baarle-Hertog delayed the work of the committee so much that nothing happened before the annexation of the Southern Netherlands by France.
