= Louis I of Vaud =

Baron of Vaud

Louis I (1249/50 – 1302) was the Baron of Vaud. At the time of his birth he was a younger son of the House of Savoy, but through a series of deaths and his own effective military service, he succeeded in creating a semi-independent principality in the pays de Vaud by 1286. He travelled widely in the highest circles of European nobility (the royal courts of London, Paris and Naples), obtained the right to mint coins from the Holy Roman Emperor, and convoked the first public assembly in the Piedmont to include members of the non-noble classes. When he died, his barony was inherited by his son.

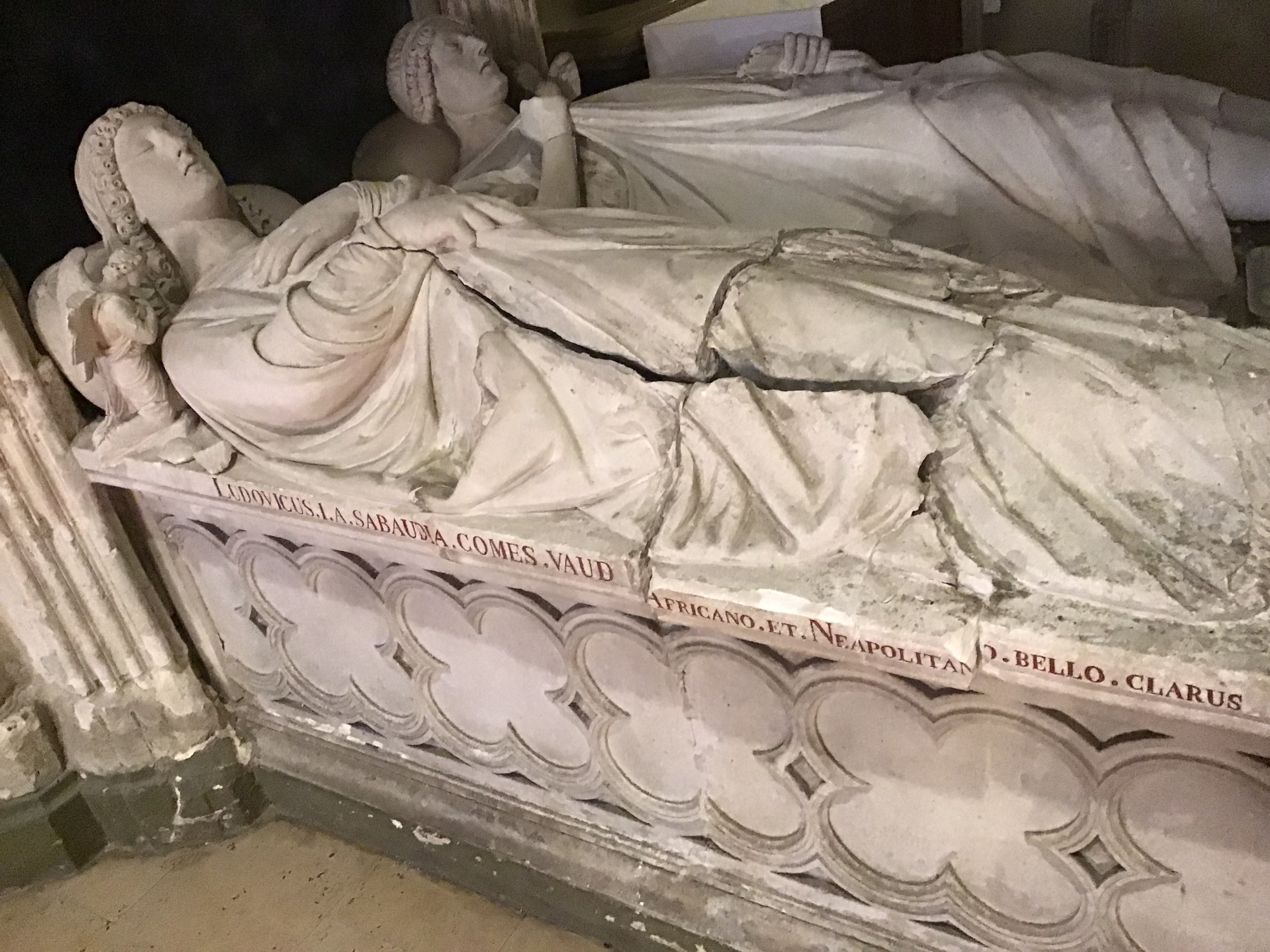
The Tomb of Louis I of Vaud

== Youth in Savoy, England and France (1259–81) ==
Louis was the third son of Thomas II of Savoy. He was in the custody of his mother, Beatrice dei Fieschi, on the death of his father in 1259, when his older brothers were hostages of the commune of Asti. His childhood was spent in the dower castles of his mother, especially that of Saint-Genix-d'Aoste on the bank of the Guiers. As a youth, in 1270, he accompanied his brothers, Thomas III and Amadeus V, to England in the hopes of receiving from King Henry III the fiefs (and incomes) which their uncle, Peter II, Count of Savoy, had bequeathed them. Some of these had already been bestowed on the king's son, Prince Edward Longshanks, who was then absent on the Ninth Crusade. Until his return, any Savoyard claims on English territory could not be resolved, so Henry instead granted each of the brothers an annual pension of one hundred marks on the royal treasury.

While Louis was living in Paris in July 1281, King Philip III of France drew him into a pro-Angevin alliance with Count Aymar IV of Valentinois and Louis de Forez, sire of Beaujeu, against the bishops of Die, Lyon and Valence. Louis seems to have been induced to join by the promise of marrying Jeanne de Montfort, widow of Guy, sire of Beaujeu and count of Forez. The marriage probably took place in 1283, when Jeanne was still of child-bearing age. Her dowry consisted of the lands held by the sire of Beaujeu in Bugey and Valromey, lands which lay in an area of Savoyard expansion between the Rhône and the Ain.

== Wars with Geneva, the Dauphiné and the king (1281–84) ==
In the fall of 1282, Louis was back in the service of his family, led by Count Philip of Savoy, when a war with Amadeus II of Geneva and his allies broke out. Louis captured the Delphinal fortress of La Buissière, and then invaded the Grésivaudan, as his brother Amadeus invaded the region south of Grenoble. Philip seems to have been grooming Louis to take command of the pays de Vaud, for as early as September 1281 he had been sent to Moudon, the earliest Savoyard town in the Vaud, to receive the homage of certain vassals of the count.

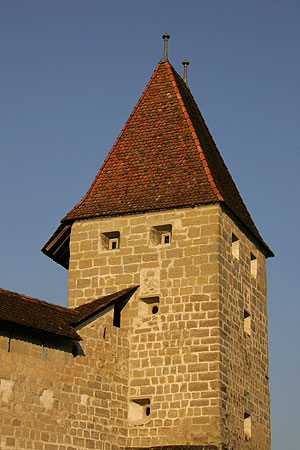
Ruins of a tower in the walls of Payerne, rescued and then stoutly defended by Louis for six months against imperial troops.

Louis may have felt underappreciated for his services at home, for Margaret of Provence, queen-mother of France and a Savoyard on her mother's side, tried to mediate between him and his brother and uncle in January 1283, to no effect. In the spring of 1283, Rudolf, King of Germany and emperor-elect, was trying to enforce his authority in Helvetia, and encroaching on the Savoyard sphere of influence. After his initial assault on Payerne in the Vaud was repulsed in June, Louis came to the city with a body of troops to relieve it. Rudolf besieged it for six months, but starvation forced capitulation in December, and the city was lost to Savoy.

After peace was concluded with the emperor-elect, Savoy was deprived of Payerne and Gümmenen, the protectorates of Morat and Bern, and the dower lands of Louis's aunt Margaret (died 1273), wife of Hartmann the Old, Count of Kyburg. All these losses would significantly reduce the sphere of influence of whichever Savoyard prince ruled the Vaud. By the peace treaty, Moudon and the important castle of Romont would remain fiefs of the Count of Savoy. Both these places had been acquired by Savoy under Thomas I, and only the acquisitions in the region made by Peter II before he became count were left to Louis. In accordance with this principle, Peter's other acquisitions in the pays de Gex and the Genevois were ceded to Amadeus. This seems to have sparked another grievance from Louis. In March 1284, he and Amadeus met at Lyon in order for Margaret and Robert II, Duke of Burgundy, to mediate their conflict. The brothers swore not to make any private alliances with the goal of furthering their claims on the succession. If the mediation of Count Philip or Queen Margaret failed to appease both parties, then they swore to abide by the judgement of Duke Robert.

== Succession crisis (1284–86) ==
In 1282 Louis's eldest brother, Thomas, died, and in the summer of 1283 his mother followed. This provoked a succession crisis, since the ruling count of Savoy, Philip, had no sons, and the sons of Thomas, thitherto his heir, were too young to hold the reins of government. In accordance with tradition, Amadeus was recognised as Philip's heir. Louis was promised an apanage, which he did not find sufficient, and the later Savoyard chroniclers Jehan Servion and Jean d'Oronville portray him as fighting his brother for the succession or for a larger share of the inheritance while their uncle was dying. Servion puts into Philip's mouth the following denunciation of Louis's motives, before he gathered together his barons and made them recognise Amadeus as his successor: "I have bestowed upon you more of my possessions than you deserve, and you are not in the least grateful. I know you well, for it is always you who complain of things. Your whole being is full of clamor, which makes you unwilling to hold to my will and commandment." It is more probable that "Louis felt inadequately rewarded for his efforts in the wars against the emperor and the dauphin in 1282–84", than that he was a person "full of clamor".

In May 1284 Louis obtained from Rudolf the right to mint coin in the pays de Vaud, an implicit imperial confirmation of his lordship there. In October Philip wrote to Eleanor of Provence, Margaret's sister and Henry III's wife, and her son, now King Edward, asking them to arbitrate Louis's grievances. He also sent the Bishop of Aosta, Nicholas Bersatori, to England to explain the problem exactly. Possibly, Philip intended only to delay Louis's resort to arms. However, Philip’s will left adjudication to Queen Eleanor and King Edward.

After Philip's death, Louis did briefly make war on his brother, but he and Amadeus arrived at a settlement in January 1286. In return for liege homage, Louis received the entire pays de Vaud between the rivers Aubonne and Veveyse, including Moudon and Romont. He also received Saillon and Conthey in the Valais and Pierre-Châtel in Bugey, and an annual pension of 400 livres viennois from the péage of Saint-Maurice-d'Agaune and Villeneuve. A few lords of the pays de Vaud remained liege vassals of the count and their lands were not a part of the barony of Vaud. These were the Count of Gruyère and the lords of Châtel and Cossonay.

== Baron of Vaud (1286–1302) ==
Politically, the barony of Vaud under Louis I was divided into ten castellanies centred on Nyon, Rolle, Morges, Moudon, Estavayer, Romont, Rue, Yverdon, Les Clées, and Vaulruz. Morges was the baronial capital, where homage was received and the administration overseen. On 15 January 1285 Louis, who was at Lyon, sent a summons to the people of the Piedmont ordering all to attend an assembly, of a type usually called a colloquy (colloquium) or parliament (parlamentum), scheduled for 24 May. This was the first assembly in the Savoyard lands that included "representatives of the non-noble classes". Louis's summons went out to "all noblemen, citizens, burgesses and others with them in the land of Piedmont from Mont Cenis to Lombardy" (universis nobilibus, civibus, burgensibus et aliis quibuscumque in terra Pedemontis a Monte Cinisii versus Lombardiam superius).

Louis's eldest son, Louis II, succeeded him in Vaud, and his daughter Blanche made an adventitious match to a nephew of Otho de Grandison. This match was arranged in May 1303 at Paris, and the sons of Pierre II de Grandison and Blanche later served the Count of Savoy.

Louis I died in Naples in 1302.

== Bibliography ==
- F. Aubert. "Numismatique du Pays de Vaud". Gazette Numismatique Suisse, 6 (1956), pp. 29–32.
- Eugene L. Cox. The Green Count of Savoy: Amadeus VI and Transalpine Savoy in the Fourteenth Century. Princeton, New Jersey: Princeton University Press, 1967.
- Eugene L. Cox. The Eagles of Savoy: The House of Savoy in Thirteenth-Century Europe. Princeton, New Jersey: Princeton University Press, 1974.
- O. Dessemontet. "Le Testament de Jeanne de Montfort, dame de Vaud". Nouvelles pages d'histoire vaudois. Lausanne: 1967, pp. 43–61.
- Girart Dorens. "Sir Otho de Grandison 1238?–1328". Transactions of the Royal Historical Society, Third Series, 3 (1909), pp. 125–95.
- Arnold Taylor. Studies in Castles and Castle-Building. London: Hambledon Press, 1985.
