= Hamal Castle =

Castle in Limburg, Belgium

- Rutten, Belgium
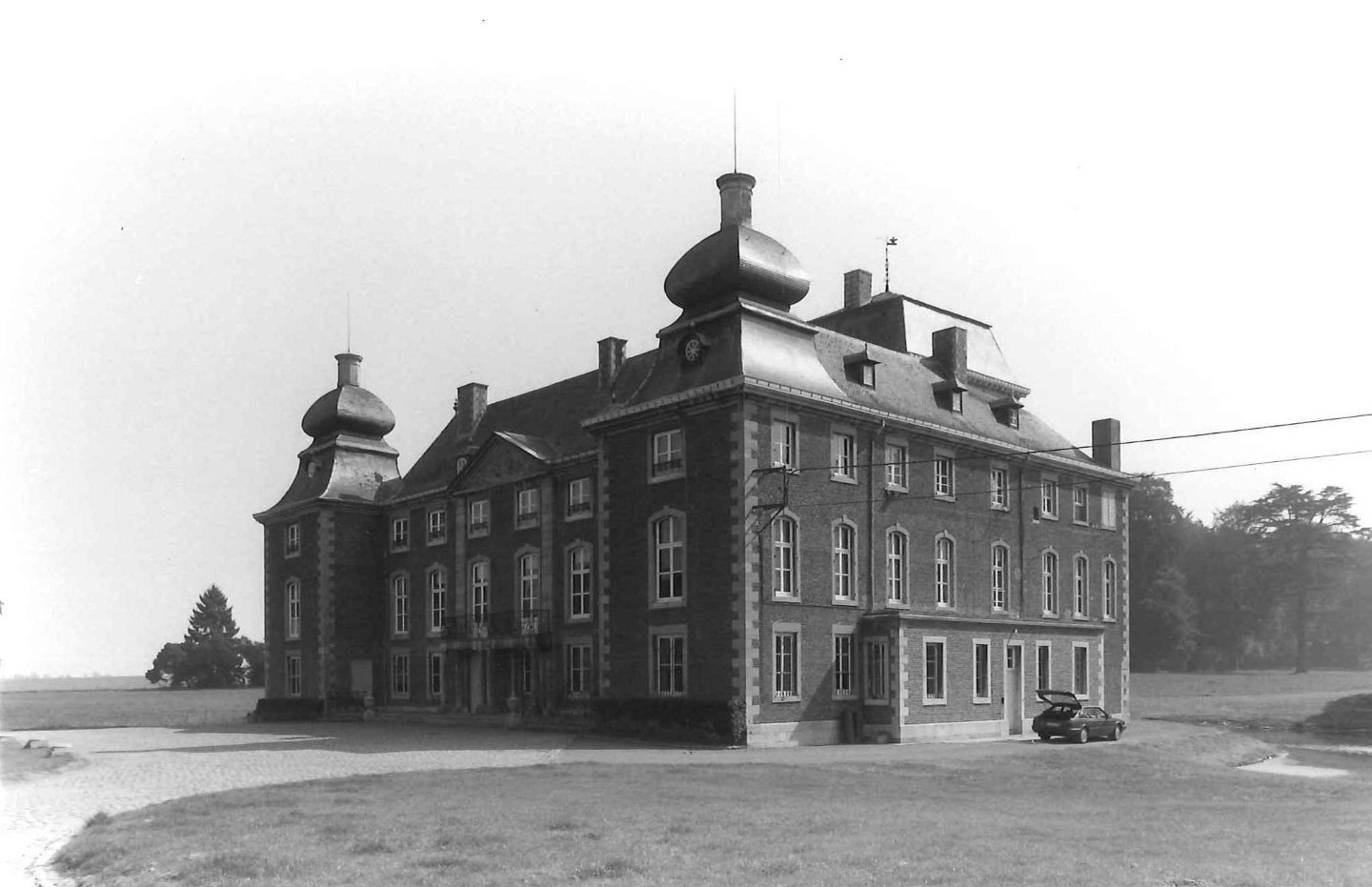

Site information
- Type: Castle

Location
- Coordinates: 50.754°N 5.461°E

Site history
- Built: late 18th century

Hamal Castle (Dutch: Kasteel van Hamal) is a castle in Rutten near Tongeren in the province of Limburg, Belgium, once the centre of the small independent lordship of Rutten. The castle was first mentioned in 1214. The current castle dates from the late 18th century.

== See also ==
- List of castles in Belgium
