= Raoul II of Brienne, Count of Eu =

French noble (1315–1350)

Raoul II of Brienne (1315 – 19 November 1350) was the son of Raoul I of Brienne, Count of Eu and Guînes and Jeanne de Mello. He succeeded his father in 1344 as Count of Eu and Guînes, as well as in his post as Constable of France.

In 1340, he married Catherine (d. 1388), the daughter of Louis II, Baron de Vaud. They had no children; one illegitimate son, Jean du Bois, Lord of la Maison Forte, was legitimized as Raoul's in 1395, although his actual genealogy is disputed. (Note: "If he had been Raoul's son, he would surely have been the bastard of Eu, rather than "of Brienne".) He was second cousin to Enguerrand VII.

In 1346, he was captured at Caen during the battle by Thomas Holland, 1st Earl of Kent and kept prisoner. (Note: Barbara Tuchman states Raoul was captured in 1345) In 1350, he was allowed to return to France to attempt to raise money for his ransom. Upon his arrival, he was seized and summarily executed by decapitation without any due process under orders of John II of France, for reasons that remain unclear, although it was rumoured that he had pledged Thomas his castle and the County of Guînes for his release.

== Sources ==
- Jones, Michael (2000). "The last Capetians and early Valois Kings, 1314-1364". In Jones, Michael (ed.). The New Cambridge Medieval History:c.1300-c.1415. Vol. 6. Cambridge University Press.
- Perry, Guy (2018). The Briennes: The Rise and Fall of a Champenois Dynasty in the Age of the Crusades, c. 950-1356. Cambridge University Press.
- St.John, Graham E. (2010). "War, the church and English Men-at-Arms". In Given-Wilson, Chris (ed.). Fourteenth Century England VI. Boydell Press.
- Sumption, Jonathan (1999). The Hundred Years War: Trial by Fire. University of Pennsylvania Press.
- Tuchman, Barbara Wertheim (1978). A Distant Mirror : The Calamitous 14th Century. Knopf. ISBN 978-0-394-40026-6.

Preceded by Raoul I	Count of Eu; 1344–1350	to royal domain
Preceded by Raoul I	Count of Guînes; 1344–1350	to royal domain
