= Treaty of Fontainebleau (1785) =

1785 treaty between the Dutch Republic and the Holy Roman Empire

The Treaty of Fontainebleau was signed on November 8, 1785 in Fontainebleau between Holy Roman Emperor Joseph II, ruler of the Habsburg monarchy, and the States-General of the United Provinces. Based on the terms of the accord, the United Provinces could maintain sovereignty over the Scheldt Estuary but had to provide several concessions to the Habsburgs, including the payment of ten million Dutch florins and the dismemberment of certain military fortifications. Overall, the treaty confirmed and reinforced the tenets of the Treaty of Münster.

The treaty was signed after the Kettle War.

== See also ==
- List of treaties
- Redemptiedorpen
