= William I of Namur =

Marquis of Namur

William I, Marquis of Namur
- Born: 1324
- Died: 1 October 1391
- Noble family: House of Dampierre
- Spouses: Jeanne of Hainault; Catherine of Savoy-Vaud
- Father: John I, Marquis of Namur
- Mother: Marie of Artois

William I (1324 – 1 October 1391), also called the Rich, was Count of Namur from 1337 until his death.

== Life ==
He was the fifth son of John I, Marquis of Namur, and Marie of Artois.

Because his four elder brothers all died childless between 1333 and 1337, he still became Marquis of Namur. Because he was a minor when he became Marquis, his mother ruled as regent until he became of age.

William participated in the Hundred Years' War on the side of the English. Despite this, Namur itself remained at peace, except for a revolt of the weavers in 1351. He was defeated and taken prisoner in the Battle of Baesweiler in 1371.

Thanks to the fortune, first of his mother and then of his wife, William was able to buy several territories which enlarged the Marquisate. In 1362 he obtained from Charles IV, Holy Roman Emperor that Namur depended directly from the Holy Roman Empire and ceased to be a vassal of the County of Hainaut. He also developed the mining and forging industries, as well as commerce.

== Family ==
He first married on 13 February 1348 with Jeanne of Hainault, daughter of John of Beaumont and Margaret of Soissons. Jeanne died 2 years later form the Black Death without children.

William remarried in March 1352 with Catherine of Savoy, daughter of Louis II of Vaud and Isabella of Châlon. They had:

- William II (1355–1418), Marquis of Namur
- John III (d. 1429), last Marquis of Namur
- Marie (d. 1412), married in 1370 Guy II de Blois-Châtillon and in 1405 Pierre de Brabant, Admiral of France.

William also had several illegitimate children.

== Sources ==
- Cox, Eugene L. (1967). The Green Count of Savoy: Amedeus VI and Transalpine Savoy in the Fourteenth-Century. Princeton University Press.

William I of Namur House of Dampierre Born: 1324 Died: 1 October 1391
Preceded by Philip III	Marquis of Namur; 1337–1391	Succeeded by William II
