= Louis II of Vaud =

A double tournois, worth two deniers tournois, an imitation of a style of Philip VI of France (1328–50), minted by Louis II, whose father had obtained the right to mint coin from the emperor-elect.

Louis II (1283/94 (Note: He was not born in 1269, as has sometimes been claimed.) – 1348/49), son of Louis I of Vaud of the House of Savoy, was the Baron of Vaud from 1302 until his death. A military man, he fought widely in Italy and, during the first phase of the Hundred Years' War, in France. As a diplomat he visited England and the papal court in Rome and Avignon, and he served as regent of the County of Savoy between 1343 and his death, during which period he was the leader of the House of Savoy.

== Family ==
Louis married Isabelle, daughter of John I, lord of Arlay, of the House of Chalon and Marguerite of Burgundy. With her he had:

- son, name unknown (died 1339)
- Catherine (died 18 June 1388), married:

1. Azzone Visconti in 1331 (widowed in 1339);
2. Raoul II of Brienne, Count of Eu, in 1340 (widowed in 1350); no children
3. William I, Marquis of Namur, in 1352; three children

== International career (1302–1343) ==
In 1308 Louis was one of those representing the Savoyards at the coronation of Edward II of England in Westminster Abbey. In 1310 he joined the expedition of Henry VII into Italy to be crowned Emperor, and was himself made a Senator of Rome. He continued to serve Henry's cause in Italy until 1313. His grandiloquent title at this time was "Louis of Savoy, a magnificent man, by the grace of God a most illustrious senator of the city of Rome".

Between 1314 and 1322, Louis led several campaigns against the Dauphiné, a traditional rival of Savoy. In 1322 his uncle and suzerain, Amadeus V, Count of Savoy, appointed him lieutenant-general of the Canavese, south of the Alps, and in 1330 he made him a member of the Council of Savoy, the highest organ of state in Savoy. In 1331 Louis was campaigning in Lombardy in an effort to carve out a new kingdom for John the Blind, King of Bohemia. The king installed his son, the future Emperor Charles IV, as his vicar in Lombardy, and appointed Louis to be Charles's chief counsellor. The baron of Vaud had to decline the office on account of a conflict of interests, since his eldest daughter Catherine had just married Azzone Visconti, lord of Milan.

== Regent of Savoy (1343–1349) ==
Louis and his immediate family were present on 12 January 1334 when Amadeus, future Count of Savoy, was baptised by the Bishop of Maurienne in the unfinished Sainte-Chapelle of the castle at Chambéry. On 26 June 1343, the same day as his father's funeral, Amadeus was proclaimed count, and his godfather Count Amadeus III of Geneva and Louis of Vaud were proclaimed his regents, as designated in the will of his father, Count Aymon. The count of Geneva and the baron of Vaud were the first to do homage to the new count of Savoy, swearing an oath to be loyal "against all who may live or die". At this time in his career—he was in his mid-fifties—Louis was "the grand old man of the dynasty in wisdom and experience."

=== Hundred Years' War ===
After 1337 Louis was frequently in France serving Philip VI with his troops during the war with the England, the Edwardian War. In 1339 Louis's only son was killed at the Battle of Laupen, and his son-in-law Azzo also died, leaving his daughter Catherine as a widow and a potential heiress. Louis's requested and received from Count Aymon permission to name her his heir in the barony, an exceptional privilege given the customs of Savoy. (Note: Cox speculates that Aymon may have thought Catherine unable to bear children after six years of fruitless marriage.)

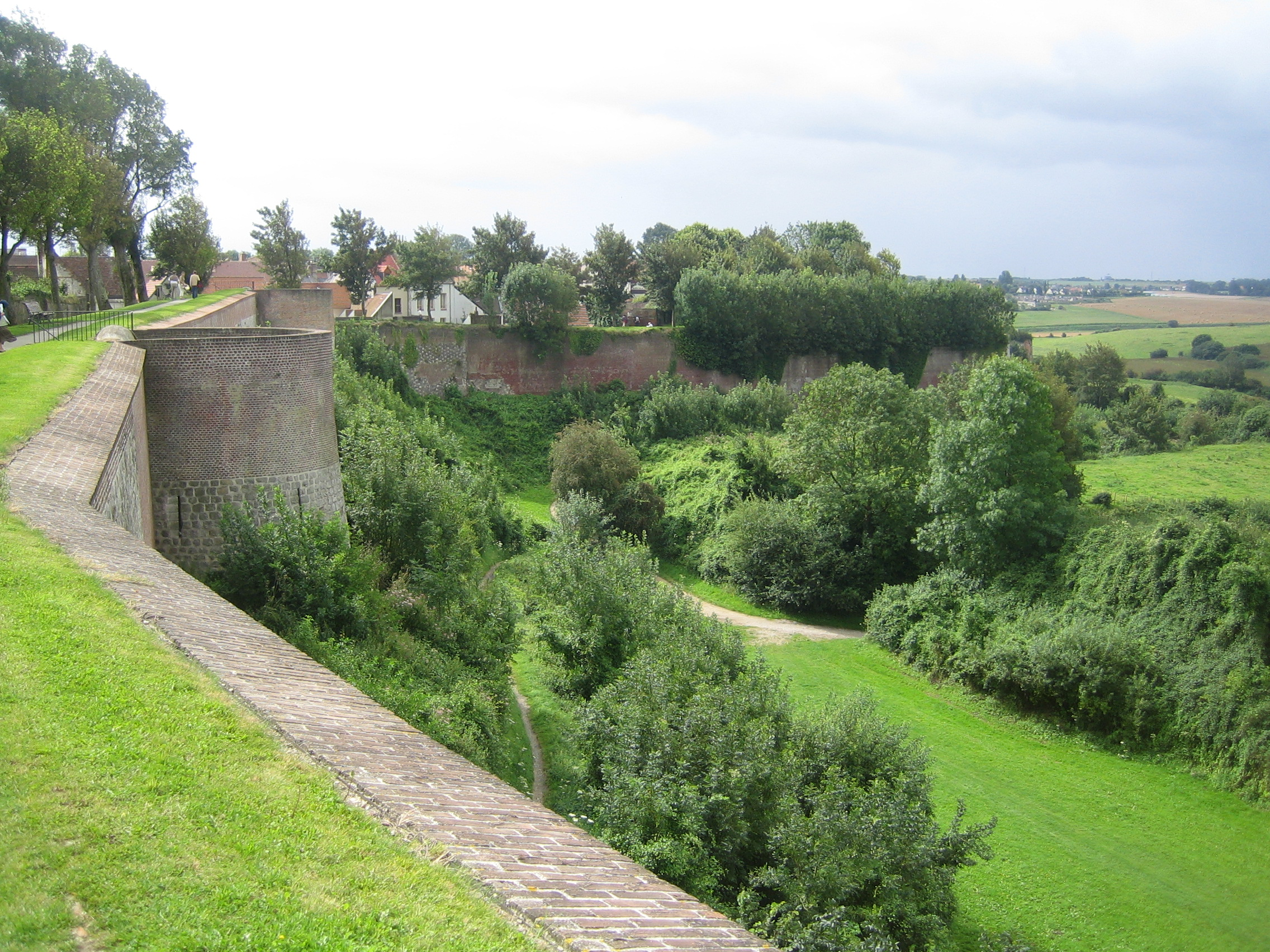
Walls of Montreuil, once garrisoned by Louis, as they are today.

In 1345 Louis was fighting with John, Duke of Normandy, in the Limousin and Auvergne against the English. (Note: Jean Froissart, the contemporary French historian, mistook Louis for the Count of Savoy in his narration of the war with England.) In 1346 Louis, responding to a springtime summons of the French king for an army from Savoy, which owed him service for a small fief the count held in Normandy, returned to France in August, but his forces did not reach the field of the Battle of Crécy (26 August) until evening, when the carnage was over. Finding the French in retreat, and without awaiting order, Louis immediately set out in the direction of the main English army and succeeded in getting to the town of Montreuil first, where he was able to deny entrance to the marshals of the king of England and garrison the walls and towers with his own men.

=== Question of the Dauphiné and the Piedmont ===
In 1343 Louis was tasked with presenting Savoyard fears about the agreed upon sale of the Dauphiné to Philip, Duke of Orléans, a younger son of the French king, to the chancellor of France. Nothing seems to have come of Louis's diplomacy, but he and fellow regent Amadeus III had been reconciled to the plan by January 1344, when they agreed to a marriage between their youthful charge and Joan, a daughter of Peter I, Duke of Bourbon, and thus a grand-niece of the French king.

In 1347 Louis again tried to block the French acquisition of the Dauphiné. When the reigning dauphin, Humbert II, returned from his Smyrniote crusade a widower in the spring, Pope Clement VI, who formerly favoured the French, encouraged him to remarry and sire an heir. The papal change of mind was probably induced by the several embassies which Louis can be shown to have sent to the papal court at Avignon during the year, from surviving treasury accounts. In May Louis was preparing to once again lead an army to the aid of France, in obedience to a summons, when he received word that his cousin James, Lord of Piedmont, was threatened by an alliance of the Visconti of Milan, former relatives by marriage of Louis's, and Marquis John II of Montferrat. The lord of Piedmont held extensive lands in the Canavese, of which Louis was lieutenant-general. Before leaving for France, Louis sent the marshal of Savoy, Antelme de Miolans, to the Piedmont with an army. After his return Louis took the cases of the Dauphiné and the Piedmont to the papal court, where he stayed through the winter of 1347–48.

"After sixty years of active and adventurous life", Louis died late in 1348 or early the next year, certainly before 29 January 1349, possibly of the Black Death then sweeping Europe. (Note: A document of that date, found in F. T. L. de Granus-Saladin, Documents rélatifs à l'histoire du Pays de Vaud (Geneva, 1817), record Louis as "once having been" (quondam)) He was succeeded by his daughter Catherine, who, twice widowed, ruled for two years jointly with her mother. The two were known as les Dames de Vaud, the ladies of Vaud.

== Bibliography ==
- de La Corbiere, Matthieu (2002). L'invention et la défense des frontières dans la diocèse de Genève étude des principautés et de l'habitat fortifié (XIIe - XIVe siècle) (in French). Académie salésienne.
- Cox, Eugene L. (1967). The Green Count of Savoy: Amadeus VI and Transalpine Savoy in the Fourteenth Century. Princeton University Press.
