= Catherine of Savoy-Vaud =

14th-century Italian vassal

Catherine of Savoy-Vaud (1324 – 18 June 1388) was an Italian vassal. She was suo jure Baron of Vaud in 1349–1359. In 1359, she sold the Barony to Amadeus VI, Count of Savoy, which united Vaud to Savoy.

She was born to Louis II of Vaud and Isabelle, daughter of John I, lord of Arlay.

She married:

1. Azzone Visconti in 1331 (widowed in 1339); one daughter
2. Raoul II of Brienne, Count of Eu, in 1340 (widowed in 1350); no children,
3. William I, Marquis of Namur, in 1352; three children.

Preceded by Beatrice d'Este	Lady of Milan; 1330–1339	Succeeded by Isabella Fieschi
