= William of Jülich =

Flemish commander during the Franco-Flemish war of 1297-1305

- Known for: Flemish military commander during the Franco-Flemish war; Grandson of the Count of Flanders Guy of Dampierre
- Died: 18 August 1304; Mons-en-Pévèle
- Cause of death: Killed during the battle of Mons-en-Pévèle
- Wars and battles: 1302 Battle of the Golden Spurs; 1303 Battle of Arques; 1304 Battle of Mons-en-Pévèle
- Noble family: House of Jülich
- Father: William of Jülich
- Mother: Maria of Dampierre

William of Jülich, called the Younger (Dutch: Willem van Gulik de Jongere; died August 18, 1304), was the grandson of the Count of Julich on his father's side and of the Count of Flanders on his mother's side.

His father and grandfather were killed during a revolt, and both William and his brother were disinherited by their paternal uncles. He pursued a religious career and was appointed Provost of Saint Servatius in Maastricht and archdeacon of the prince-bishopric of Liège.

In 1302 his maternal uncles John I, Marquis of Namur and Guy of Namur sent William in the middle of the Franco-Flemish War to the town of Bruges which had revolted against the King Charles IV of France. Together with Pieter de Coninck he became leader of the rebellion and tried to restore the authority of the Count of Flanders. William was one of the three commanders of the Flemish militia army that defeated the French army at the Battle of the Golden Spurs in July 1302. The next year he commanded a Flemish militia army that defeated the French in the Battle of Arques.

He was elected Archbishop of Cologne in April 1304 but died in the Battle of Mons-en-Pévèle on 18 August 1304 before he could take up that office.

== Life ==
=== Early Life ===
William was the younger son of William, who was himself the eldest son and heir of William IV, Count of Jülich. His mother Maria of Dampierre, was a daughter of Guy of Dampierre, Count of Flanders with his second wife Matilda of Bethune. William had also an elder brother with the same name. (Note: Thus, William's father, grandfather, and elder brother were all named William. In families that placed particular importance on preserving a name across generations, it was not unusual to give the same name to more than one son. If the eldest died, a younger son bearing the same name could still carry on the family name.) In 1278 both his father and grandfather were killed during a revolt of the people of Aachen. As the two boys were still infants, the brothers of his father took hold of the County of Jülich, which left both William and his elder brother desinherited. Both brothers sought refuge in Flanders, where they had family connections through their mother. The elder William became involved in the Franco-Flemish War and was killed fighting the French during the Battle of Furnes in 1297, while the younger William was destined for a religious career. In 1299, William was appointed provost of Church of Saint Servatius in Maastricht and archdeacon in the Prince-bishopric of Liège. In 1300 he was studying in Bologna and was in the running to become Archbishop of either Cologne or Mainz. Despite these religious ambitions, William was not a religious character. According to the Annals of Ghent and the Spieghel historiael of Lodewijk van Velthem, he was superstitious and his inner circle consisted of knights, beautiful women and black magicians.

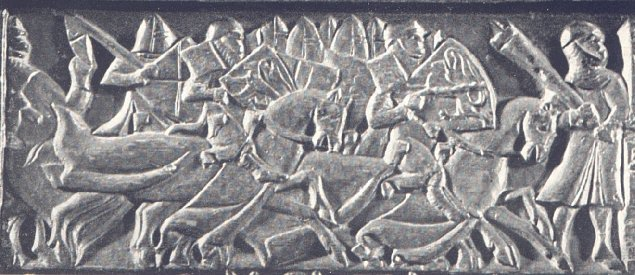
The arrival of Guy of Namur and William of Jülich in Bruges as depicted on the Courtrai Chest. William is riding behind Guy, both are holding a shield with a heraldic lion rampant.

=== Flemish rebellion ===
The Franco-Flemish war had resulted by 1300 in the annexation of the County of Flanders by the French King Charles IV into the French Crown land. William's maternal grandfather, Count Guy of Flanders, and his eldest two uncles, the future Robert III of Flanders and William of Crèvecoeur, were imprisoned in France. By 1302, discontent with the new taxes levied by the French King led to rebellions in the cities of Ghent and Bruges. William's uncles John I, Marquis of Namur and Guy of Namur hoped to reinstate the politcal power of the counts of Flanders through these rebellions, and sent William to Bruges in early May 1302 as a representative of the Count of Flanders. On his arrival in Bruges, he was appointed as leader of the rebellion, together with Pieter de Coninck, a local leader of the craft guilds of Bruges. William and Pieter then took with the militia of Bruges the castles at Sijsele and Maele. At Maele they massacred the garrison of twelve man. The rebellion broke down when the French governor Jacques de Châtillon appeared with an army before Bruges. Both William and Pieter fled the city. However, during the Matins of Bruges on 19 May 1302 the militia of Bruges ambushed the French troops and William and Pieter returned in triumph to Bruges. William was appointed as ruwaard ('advocatus') of Flanders, representing the count who was imprisoned in France. He took command of some Flemish militia troops, liberated the coastal region of Flanders from French control, and finally laid siege to the castle of Cassel.

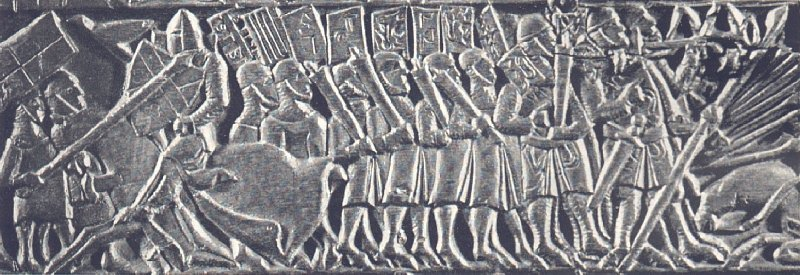
The battle line at the battle of the Golden Spurs depicted on the Courtrai Chest is showing William holding a goedendag, behind Guy of Namur.

After the Matins of Bruges, Guy of Namur took command of some milita troops of Bruges and liberated the region south of Bruges. He laid siege to the castle of Kortrijk, the other remaining French stronghold in Flanders. Guy knew that the garrison in Kortrijk did not have many provisions and was bound to surrender soon. The expected French relief army would hence march very likely towards Kortrijk to break the siege. Guy asked William to lift the siege at Cassel and join him at Kortrijk. This concentration of forces allowed the Flemish militia to gain a spectacular victory over the French Knight army in the Battle of the Golden Spurs on 11 July 1302. William commanded the left wing of the Flemish forces and encouraged his troops by his presence in the front lines.

=== Final years ===
After the battle, his uncles John and Guy feared William would abuse his popularity in Bruges to pursue his own goals. In October 1302, John had William replaced by Guy as ruwaard, and sent William away on a minor campaign to conquer the castle of Rupelmonde. In March 1303, he led a Flemish invasion of Picardy. During this campaign, William gained another victory against the French in the Battle of Arques, but he was criticised because this victory came at a heavy cost in manpower. In June 1303 another uncle of William, Philip of Chieti arrived from Italy and was appointed substitute count of Flanders. Philip and William led a Flemish incursion into Artois. The Flemish militia met a French army at Saint-Omer on 11 July 1303 but the French army did not give battle and fled away. The Flemish destroyed Thérouanne and then started the Siege of Tournai. On 20 September the hostilities ended when a truce was declared until Pentecost of 1304.

William was elected Archbishop of Cologne in April 1304. He sent envoys to Rome to seek confirmation of his appointment from Pope Benedict XI, but the pope died on 7 July. William died before his appointment was ratified by the next pope. Despite being elected as archbishop of Cologne, William remained in Flanders, probably in pursuit of personal glory and to take revenge for the death of his elder brother, killed by the French in 1297. In August 1304, Charles IV returned with an army and defeated the Flemings during the Battle of Mons-en-Pévèle. During this battle, William was in charge of the town militia of Ypres. He led a successful attack on the right wing, but when the left wing of the Flemish battle line fled, he and his troops were cut off and killed.
