= Franco-Flemish War =

Conflict between the Kingdom of France and the County of Flanders from 1297 to 1305

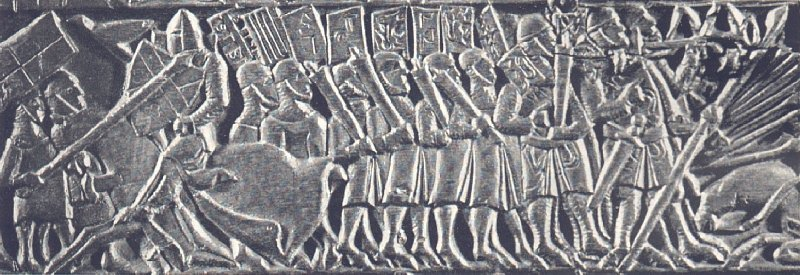
- The Flemish forces at the Battle of the Golden Spurs (1302) as depicted on the Courtrai Chest.
Date	1297 – 1305
Location	County of Flanders and surroundings
Result	Treaty of Athis-sur-Orge
Territorial changes	Flanders cedes Lille, Douai, and Bethune to France

Belligerents
Kingdom of France	County of Flanders

Commanders and leaders
Philip IV of France (WIA); Robert II of Artois †; Rainier Grimaldi	William of Jülich †; Guy of Namur (POW); Philip of Chieti

The Franco-Flemish War (French: Guerre de Flandre) was a conflict between the Kingdom of France and the County of Flanders between 1297 and 1305. The war is related to the original Gascon War and the First War of Scottish Independence, as Philip IV of France and Edward I of England sought allies in Scotland and Flanders respectively and thus involved the related conflicts.

The war started in 1297, and, because of the insufficient support from Edward, France was able to conquer much of the county. The pope intervened with a truce which allowed Edward to disengage from the war. The war resumed in 1300 and resulted in a quick victory for the French. Philip annexed the county into his crown land and replaced the count of Flanders with a governor. Social unrest caused by French taxes and the harsh reaction of the French governor to this unrest escalated into a local rebellion which soon gained wide support in the county. After the defeat of the French knights in July 1302 by the militia of the Flemish towns in the Battle of the Golden Spurs, the Flemish count regained control of his county.

Philip continued the military campaigns against the county of Flanders. Two more invasions in 1302 and 1303 were inconclusive, but after the Battle of Mons-en-Pévèle in 1304 both sides agreed to a negotiated solution, which was finally settled in 1305 with the Treaty of Athis-sur-Orge. This treaty resulted in heavy fines and war payments for the Flemish towns, and the annexation of the County of Artois by France, but the Count of Flanders was restored as a vassal of the French king, albeit with reduced authority.

== Background ==
When Philip the Fair became king of France in 1285, he changed the French policy in two ways: no more constant military campaigning like his father had done in Italy and Spain but instead opponents were challenged with legal arguments before the Parlement of Paris, and no more campaigning abroad but instead reinforcing the royal power within his kingdom by trying to subject the powerful vassals in the Duchy of Brittany, County of Champagne, Duchy of Aquitaine and County of Flanders. Through the parlement of Paris, Philip intervened always in favour of the big towns of Flanders, Ghent, Bruges and Ypres in their numerous conflicts with Guy of Dampierre, Count of Flanders.

Despite having been forced to accept the loss of Normandy, Maine, Anjou and Poitou in the 1259 Treaty of Paris after a century of conflict, the Kingdom of England continued to hold the Channel Islands and the massive Duchy of Aquitaine in nominal vassalage to the French king. There was intense maritime traffic between England and Bordeaux in Aquitaine. In 1292 conflicts between English and Gascon sailors on the one side and Flemish and French sailors on the other side, escalated into acts of piracy. The trade between England and the continent was hampered by this conflict and Guy, Count of Flanders went to England in May 1292 to discuss a solution to this conflict. As part of these discussions, Guys' daughter Philippa was betrothed to Prince Edward, the future Edward II.

These same maritime conflicts caused Philip to summon King Edward I as his vassal to the Parliament of Paris. When Edward refused to appear, Philip annexed Acquitaine, triggering the 1294–1303 Gascon War. When Guy appeared before the parliament of Paris in 1294 to handle a conflict with the city of Ghent, Philip considered to betrothal of Philippa and Edward to be high treason and had Guy imprisoned until February 1295. Philippa was brought to Paris, where she remained until her death on 2 February 1304. Philp also forced two other children of Guy to break off their betrothal to high-class princesses.

Because of the Anglo-French war, in July 1294 Philip blocked the trade between England and Flanders which harmed the Flemish economy as it relied heavily on the import of English wool. On top of that in January 1296 Philip levied a new unpopular war tax, to be collected by the Flemish count. When Guy in July 1296 disputed with the king over the possession of Valenciennes and the installation of a new government in Ghent, Philip had the county of Flanders sequestred. The Flemish count kept his titles and rights, but all Flemish government was replaced by French royal commissioners.

Finally Guy was summoned before the king in August 1296. Guy had hoped to appear before the Court of Pairs where he could challenge Philip for his humiliating deeds but instead his case was handled by the Parlement of Paris which was controlled by Philip. The result was a further humiliation where the count had to pay a fine and accept the installation of a royal supervisor in each town. The constant harassment of these supervisors proved to be the last push the Flemish needed to start a rebellion. After securing an alliance with Edward I, king of England, Guy sent a letter on 7 January 1297 in which he summed up all the humiliations he had endured with the conclusion that there was no other choice but to renounce his vassalage to King Philip IV.

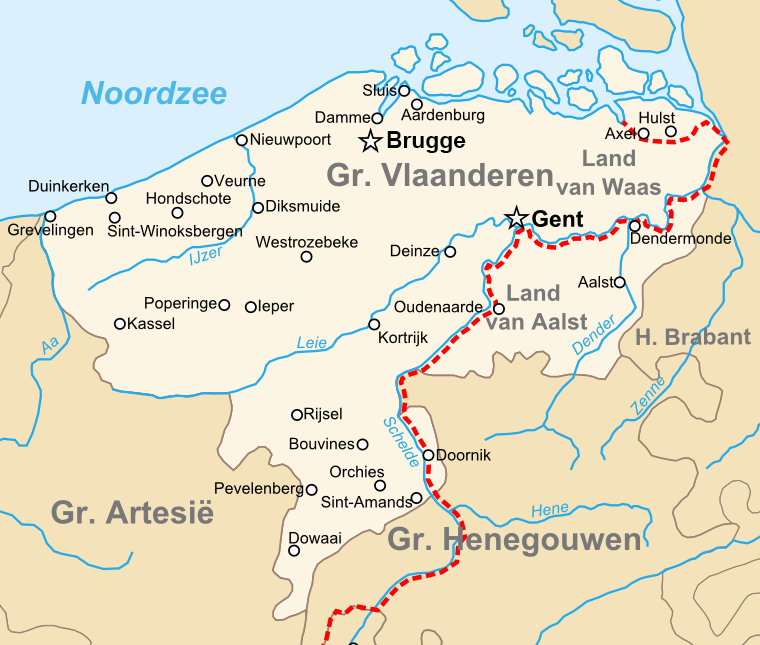
The county of Flandes in the 14th century

== French conquest ==
=== French invasion in Flanders ===
In January 1297 Count Guy allied himself with Edward I, king of England; John I, count of Holland; Henry III, count of Bar; and Adolf of Nassau, king of the Germans. Philip responded by declaring Guy's titles forfeit, annexing Flanders to the royal domain, and sending a French army to conquer it. The count of Flanders received little support from his allies: an invasion of Champagne by Count Henry III of Bar (June 1297) was easily beaten back by King Philip's wife, Queen Joan I of Navarre, the German king encountered opposition from a French backed rival Albert I of Habsburg and fell in battle in 1298. The count's eldest son Robert of Bethune speedily occupied Mortagne, at the confluence of the Scheldt and the Scarpe, and the castle of Helkijn. In March 1297 King Phillip IV arrested all partisans of Count Guy and seized all their property. Philip IV then occupied the castle of l’Ecluse near Douai.

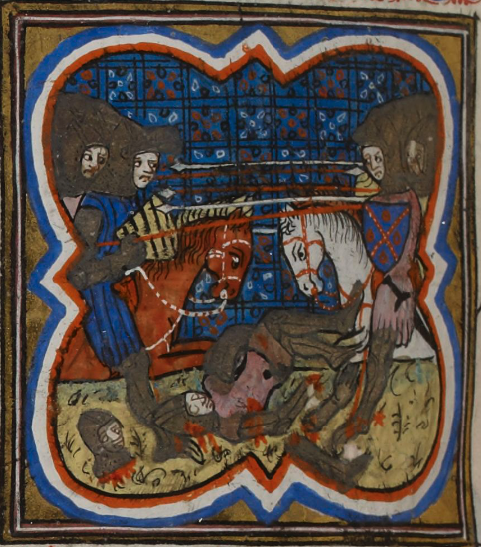
The Battle of Furnes depicted in the Grandes Chroniques de France

Expecting the English King to arrive soon with a large army, the Flemish took a defensive position and kept their troops in the reinforced cities of Lille, Douai, Ypres and Ghent. But the English King Edward encountered opposition by the English nobility and clergy against a Flemish enterprise and was faced with the First War of Scottish Independence. This meant that Count Guy effectively faced the French alone. In June 1297, the French army under the command of the king's brother Charles of Valois and Raoul de Nesle gathered at Compiegne and marched towards Lille. They fought their way over the river Scarpe at Râches, bypassed the town of Douai and laid siege to Lille, which was defended by a 3,000-man strong Flemish Army under the command of Robert of Béthune, the eldest son of the Flemish count. In August 1297, the French troops were reinforced when Robert of Artois returned from his successful campaign against Edward in Aquitaine. Artois's troops marched upon Cassel, which, except for the Flemish-occupied castle, was burned, and to Sint-Winoksbergen, Mardyck and Dunkirk which surrendered. A Flemish counter-attack on Artois resulted in a French victory at the Battle of Furnes on 20 August 1297. Five days later a truce was concluded at Lille, where the Flemish army agreed to evacuate the city if no reinforcements appeared by 1 September.

In August, King Edward finally set sail for Flanders with his army, arriving on 28 August in Sluis. On 1 September Edward was in Bruges when the Flemish surrendered Lille. Despite the English reinforcements, The Flemish were dispirited and abandoned Kortrijk without a fight. Philips showed lenience towards surrendering towns, which encouraged Bruges and Damme to surrender as well. King Edward and the Flemish army retreated to Ghent. With Ghent too strong defended, the war stalled, and both sides were happy to accept a truce proposed by the Pope on 12 October. Just before the truce became effective, Robert of Bethune quickly retook Damme which gave the Flemish and King Edward access to sea, but deprived Bruges of its port. During the winter, both sides reinforced their strongholds. The French built new city walls around Bruges, The Flemish reinforced Ghent, Aardenburg, Cassel, Damme, Deinze and Oudenaarde.

=== Armistice ===
All sides, English, French and Flemish, agreed to accept the outcome of the mediation by the pope, so Edward returned with his army to England in March 1298. Two of Guys' sons, Robert of Béthune and John I of Namur went to Rome to plead the Flemish case, they met in Rome with Philip of Chieti, yet another son of Guy who was married with an Italian princess. They were no match for the French delegation led by the legalist Pierre Flotte, who brushed the Flemish side away during the negotiations. The Papal verdict of 27 June 1298 focussed on halting the Ango-French war; it allowed the English King to break his treaty with the Count of Flanders, it sealed the peace with the marriage of the son of Edward with a daughter of Philip instead of Guy. The pope urged Guy to conform to the demands of the Philip. The Treaty of Montreuil established peace in 1299 between Edward and Philip and left the Flemish count without any allies.

=== Flemish surrender ===
On 3 November 1299, Count Guy abdicated and turned over the government to his eldest son Robert. In January 1300, the French gathered their army under the command of Charles of Valois in Lens, where on the expiration of the armistice on 6 January, a delegation from Douai surrendered their town. The French army initiated skirmishes alongside the armistice line of 1298. A French detachment led by Wale Paièle plundered and burned the countryside around Ypres and Cassel. Charles of Valois marched to Bruges which was in French hands. From Bruges Charles raided Maldegem and made a sortie towards Ghent, burning Nevele and twelve other towns and hamlets. From March 1300, the French besieged Damme and Ypres, where the defences respectively was led by the Count's sons William of Dendermonde and Guy of Namur. At the end of April William surrendered Damme, Aardenburg and Sluis. After these setbacks and with little good prospects to continue the war, Robert decide to ask for terms to surrender. The French king promised not to execute nor imprison the count and his old father, to respect all the charters of the town regardless whether they had supported the rebellion or not, but he demanded the count to subject to his authority. Ghent surrendered to the French on 8 May, Oudenaarde on 11 May, and Ypres on 21 May 1300. On 24 May the old count, his sons Robert and William and several Flemish nobles arrived in Paris and were led into captivity, and the complete county of Flanders was under French control.

== Rebellion ==
The conquest of Flanders had been relatively easy, because the Flemish cities had remained neutral up to then. The cities, governed by patricians, had a long history of conflict with the Count of Flanders over the level of control the count had over their affairs. The patricians had turned to the French King for support, who had thankfully intervened in their favour, thus increasing his influence in Flanders. In contemporary documents, the Flemish supporters of the French King were called Leliaards, after the Fleur-de-lis depicted on the royal Coat of arms, and also included a part of the rural nobility.

The urban proletariat hoped for more justice and a better distribution of wealth under the new ruler, but Philip IV appointed Jacques de Châtillon as governor of the county, a very bad choice. Together with the Leliaards, this undiplomatic soldier imposed a very repressive government, raising new taxes, which infuriated the Flemish. Soon the urban guilds forged an alliance with the Flemish nobles supporting the count. They were called Liebaarts or Klauwaards by later chroniclers, (Note: The name Liebaart appears only in one document, the 1310 Spieghel Historiael by Lodewijk van Velthem. The name Klauwaard is used for the first time during the Ghent rebellion of 1379-1385.) after the heraldic depiction of a lion rampant on the Flemish coat of arms.

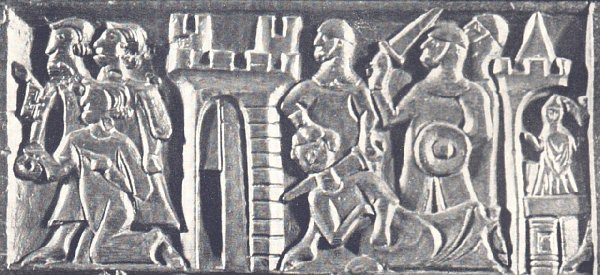
Depiction of the Matins of Bruges on the Courtrai Chest

=== Matins of Bruges ===
Philip formally annexed the county of Flanders to his Crown land and usurped all the duties of the Count of Flanders: he negotiated town privileges, appointed officials and managed the comital properties. Between 13 May and 14 June 1301 Philip made a joyous entry in Lille, Tournai, Courtrai, Ghent, Brugge and Ieper, to confirm his authority over the county of Flanders. At Bruges the visit left a bitter taste, as the heavy cost of the royal visit was paid by a new tax. The harsh reaction of Jacques de Chatillon to the social unrest caused by the heavy taxes eventually escalated into open rebellion. When he entered the town on 17 May with a small army, the town militia massacred these troops in the morning of 18 May in the Bruges Matins. De Châtillon escaped with the remainder of his troops to the castle of Courtrai.

By 1302 the old Guy of Dampierre and his two eldest sons were still in French captivity. The Flemish comital family was very large; Guy had eight children from his first marriage and another eight from a second marriage. The two eldest sons of his second marriage, John I, Marquis of Namur and Guy of Namur, held fiefs outside the French kingdom and were not too much involved until now. But as they had many interests in the county of Flanders, they looked for an opportunity to restore the comital authority in Flanders. They were in touch with Pieter de Coninck, the leader of the rebels in Bruges, and they sent another family member, William of Jülich, the grandson of Guy, to Bruges. William was appointed Advocatus (Flemish: Ruwaard) of the county of Flanders, representing the authority of the count of Flanders, who was imprisoned in France.

=== Battle of the Golden Spurs ===
William took command of some Flemish militia troops, liberated the coastal region of Flanders from French control, and then lay siege before the castle of Cassel. In the meantime, his uncle Guy of Namur had liberated the region South of Bruges and on 23 June laid siege to the other remaining stronghold of the French troops in Flanders, the castle of Kortrijk. Since the garrison in Kortrijk did not have many provisions and was bound to surrender soon, Guy judged that the French relief army would march towards Kortrijk to break the siege and asked William to lift the siege at Cassel and join him at Kortrijk. The city of Ghent remained neutral, but some rebels under the command of Jan Borluut joined the Flemish forces.

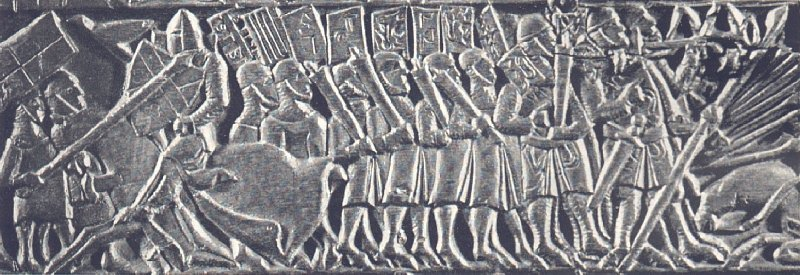
The Flemish battle line in the battle of the Golden Spurs. The town militia with their banners and armed with goedendags are led by William of Jülich and Guy of Namur.

In order to crush the rebellion at Bruges, Philip called up the royal army to assemble at Lens on 30 June under the command of Count Robert II of Artois. The French troops arrived at Kortrijk on 8 July. The next two days these troops stormed the Tournai gate and the Lille gate but could not breach the city defense. On 11 July Robert decided to give battle in the open field. The two forces clashed on 11 July in an open field near the city in the Battle of the Golden Spurs. The Flemish militia prevailed against all expectations against the renowned French cavalry. The militia took few prisoners and many French knights were killed.

After the victory in Kortrijk, the Flemish rebels entered Ghent, conquered Lille, Douai, Béthune and Cassel, and by November 1302 controlled the complete county of Flanders. Most of the towns installed a government controlled by the guilds and with Flemish as official language. In September the French King arrived with a larger army near Douai but hesitated to attack. Negotiations with Flemish representatives were fruitless and in the end the French army retreated without giving battle. In April 1303 a Flemish army under William of Jülich defeated at heavy cost a French army in the Battle of Arques. In June 1303 another brother of Guy and John, Philip of Chieti arrived from Italy and was appointed substitute count of Flanders. He led a Flemish incursion into Artois. The Flemish militia met the French army at Saint-Omer on 11 July 1303 but again the French army did not give battle and fled away.The Flemish destroyed Thérouanne and then started the Siege of Tournai. On 20 September the hostilities ended when a truce was declared until Pentecost of 1304.

== Zealand diversion ==
While William and Philip were campaigning against France, Guy pursued now his personal interests and reignated the old feud with the House of Avesnes over claims on the County of Zeeland. Zealand had been contested between the Count of Flanders and the Count of Holland since the early 11th century and had become part of Holland by 1076. Guy and his brother John invaded first Hainaut in 1302 and conquered Lessines, then next Guy formed a Flemish fleet at Sluis and sailed on 23 April 1303 to claim Zeeland for himself. The fleet landed in Veere, conquered Middelburg and in July concluded a treaty with John II of Holland in which he was recognized as Count of Zealand, except for Zierikzee.

In March 1304 Guy started a new campaign and sailed with 43 ships to Duiveland and defeated Guy of Avesnes, after which he conquered the Prince-Bishopric of Utrecht. Encouraged by this success Guy decided to continue the campaign, even though in the meantime the truce with France had ended. He gathered a large army mainly consisting of militia men from Bruges and sailed to Zierikzee. The French king sent a French fleet under Rainier Grimaldi to aid the Count of Holland and on 10 and 11 August 1304 in the Battle of Zierikzee a combined Franco-Hollandic fleet defeated the Flemish fleet. Guy of Namur was captured and Zealand was retaken by the Count of Holland.

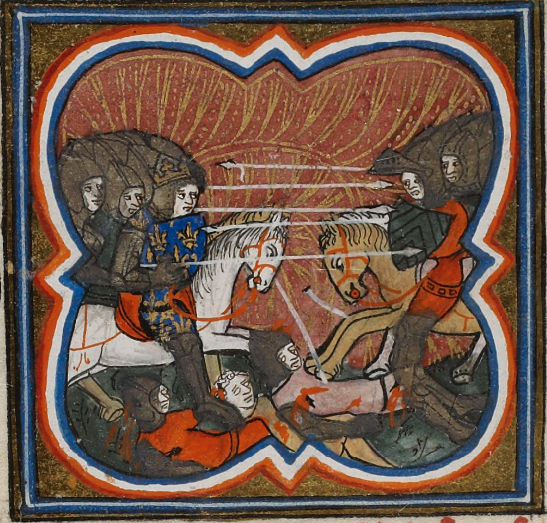
The Battle of Mons-en-Pévèle depicted in the Grandes Chroniques de France

== Final campaign ==
During the 1303-1304 truce, King Philip raised new taxes to finance another campaign in Flanders. The royal army gathered in Arras on 24 June, but only at the end of July the French army started to move towards Lille. The Flemish cities of Bruges, Ghent, Ypres, Lille and Courtrai raised their militia and the two armies clashed on 18 August in the Battle of Mons-en-Pévèle. Both sides claimed victory, but as the Flemish troops had left the battlefield, Philip was able to continue his advance and lay siege to Lille. But when the reinforced Flemish militia reappeared on 21 September, Philip realized a military victory was elusive and on 23 September a truce was concluded at the abbey of Marquette.

The Treaty of Athis-sur-Orge was eventually signed on 23 June 1305, which recognised Flemish independence as a fief of France but at the cost of the cities of Lille, Douai and Bethune, which were transferred to the French crown-lands, and the paying of exorbitant fines to Philip IV. So just like one century ago, when after the Battle of Bouvines France stopped short of annexing the County of Flanders in the Treaty of Melun, the count of Flanders was reinstated as a vassal of the King of France. Most likely Philips reinstated the count of Flanders not as a result of his military opposition but because the French government in 1300-1302 had been unsuccessful and he really needed somebody that was able collect the huge taxes and fines that were exacted from the Flemish cities, as the Philip was always in urgent need for money.

== See also ==
- Courtrai Chest
- Annals of Ghent

== Bibliography ==
- Boone, Marc (2002). "Een verstedelijkte samenleving onder spanning. Het graafschap Vlaanderen omstreeks 1302" [An urbanized society under pressure. The county of Flanders around 1302]. In van Caenegem, Raoul C. (ed.). 1302 Feiten & Mythen van de Guldensporenslag [1302 Facts & Myths about the battle of the golden spurs] (in Dutch). Antwerpen: Mercatorfonds. ISBN 9061535166.
- De Maesschalck, Edward (2019). De Graven van Vlaanderen (861-1384) [The Counts of Flanders (861-1384)] (in Dutch) (2nd ed.). DavidsFonds / Standaard uitgeverij. ISBN 9789002268458.
- Demets, Lisa (2024). Breydel [Breydel] (in Dutch). Antwerpen: Uitgeverij Vrijdag. ISBN 9789464341799.
- Gillespie, Alexander (2016). The Causes of War. Vol. II: 1000 CE to 1400 CE. Bloomsbury Publishing.
- Heirbaut, Dirk (2002). "Jan van Renesse en de andere Vlaamse aanvoerders in de Guldensporenslag" [John of Renesse and the other Flemish commanders of the battle of the Golden Spurs]. In Trio, Paul; Heirbaut, Dirk; van den Auweele, Dirk (eds.). Omtrent 1302 [About 1302] (in Dutch). Leuven: Universitaire Pers Leuven. ISBN 9058672085.
- Hellinga, Gerben Graddesz (2013). Graven Van Vlaanderen [Counts Of Flanders] (in Dutch). Zutphen: Walburg pers. ISBN 9789057309250.
- Lambert, Véronique; Dumoleyn, Jan (2002). "De cruciale decennia in de geschiedenis van een Europese stad. Brugge tussen 1280 en 1302" [The crucial decennia in the history of a European town. Bruges between 1280 and 1302]. In Trio, Paul; Heirbaut, Dirk; van den Auweele, Dirk (eds.). Omtrent 1302 [About 1302] (in Dutch). Leuven: Universitaire Pers Leuven. ISBN 9058672085.
- van den Auweele, Dirk (2002). "11 juli 1302. De staatsrechterlijke prehistorie van de Guldensporenslag" [11 July 1302. The constitutional prehistory of the Battle of the Golden Spurs]. In Trio, Paul; Heirbaut, Dirk; van den Auweele, Dirk (eds.). Omtrent 1302 [About 1302] (in Dutch). Leuven: Universitaire Pers Leuven. ISBN 9058672085.
- Verbruggen, J.F.; Falter, Rolf (2001). 1302 Opstand in Vlaanderen [1302 Revolt in Flanders] (in Dutch). Tielt: Lannoo. ISBN 9020944126.
