= Courtrai Chest =

Medieval oak chest

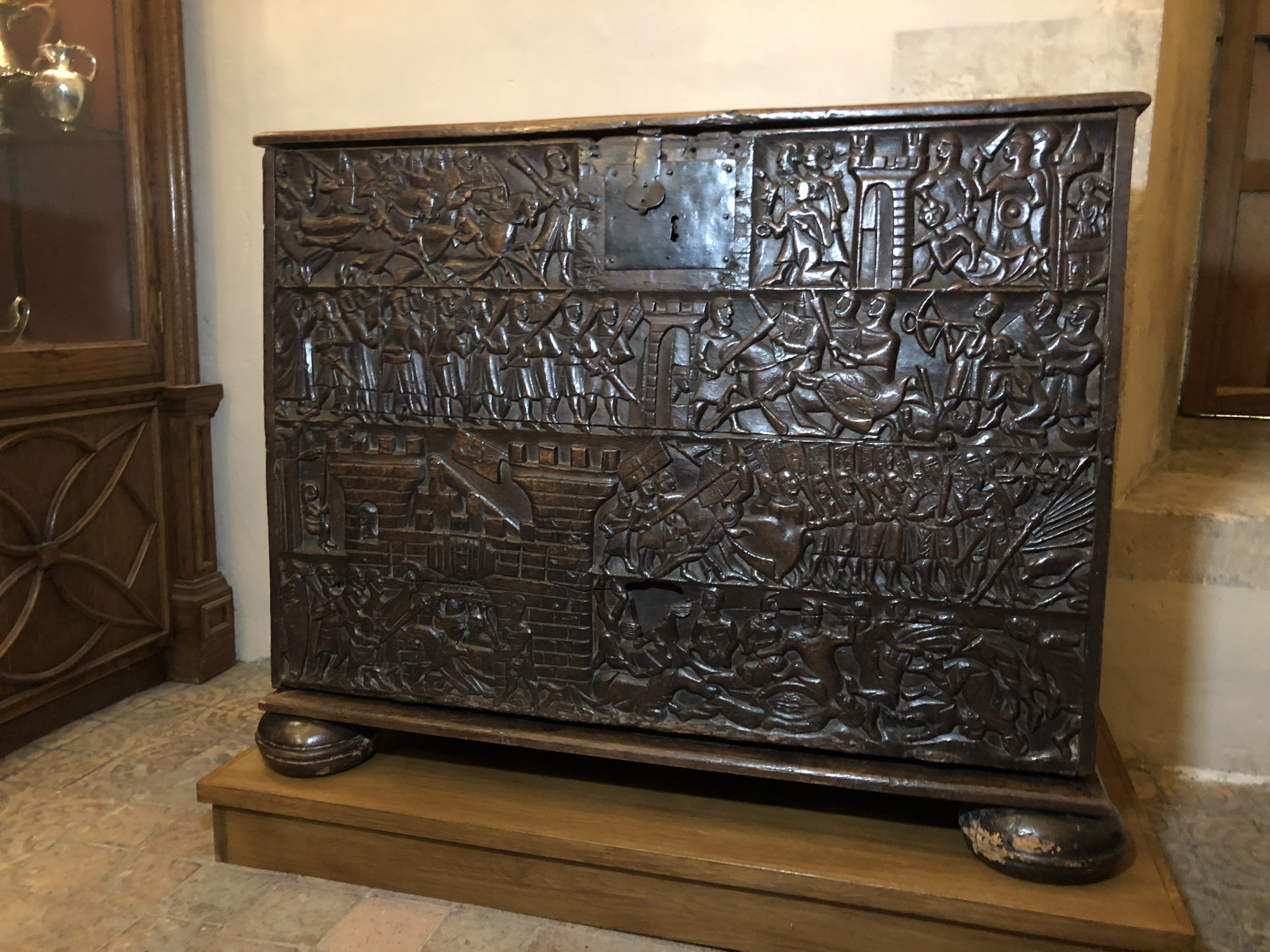
View of the original chest at New College, Oxford

The Courtrai Chest is an oak chest that incorporates medieval carvings depicting scenes from the Franco-Flemish War, in particular the Battle of the Golden Spurs at Kortrijk (French: Courtrai) in Flanders. The chest is among the few surviving contemporaneous depictions of those historically-significant events.

== History ==
The Courtrai Chest is a 17th-century oak construction but incorporates an older front-face measuring 102 cm by 71 cm, dating from the 14th century. This bears carvings in relief illustrating episodes from the Franco-Flemish War (1297–1305) from the Bruges Matins (13 May 1302) to the Battle of the Golden Spurs (11 July 1302).

The Chest was discovered around 1905 in the village of Stanton St John, Oxfordshire, which was a village largely owned by New College, Oxford. Found by Warden of the College, William Archibald Spooner, on a "Warden's Progress", it was in a barn of a college tenant where it was used as a feed bin for animals. Nothing is apparently known of the circumstances in which the Chest arrived in Oxfordshire. The Chest is kept at New College, Oxford, where it may be viewed by appointment.

A first Dendrochronological examination was executed in 1978 by the Research Laboratory for Archaeology and the History of Art at the University of Oxford. The upper plank of the front panel contained 274 growth rings, the lower plank 234. Comparing the pattern of these growth rings with those of other chests from Westminster Abbey and from Hesse dated the wood to 970 until 1243. Since all growth rings of the sapwood and some of the heartwood were missing, the date of cutting the tree was put to 1270. As it was known from the Westminster Abbeys' chests that there was usually 50 years between cutting the tree and effectively using the wood, the front panel of the Courtrai chest was dated to short after the battle of the Golden Spurs.

A second Radiocarbon dating examination was done in 1987. Samples with a diameter of 0.2 mm were taken from the eldest and youngest growth ring. The sample of the youngest growth ring was dated between 1220 and 1480 with the highest probalility at 1280. In 1997 further dendrochronological research revealed that the pattern of the growth rings linked the wood of the front panel to South Sweden.

In 1997-2001 it was speculated that the Courtrai chest arrived in Stanton St John through John St John. St John had participated in the Franco-Flemish war, he had been captured in 1297 by Robert II of Artois. After paying his ransom he returned to England where he was involved in the negotiations between the English king Edward I and the Count of Flanders about further participation in the war. Right after the battle of the Golden Spurs the chest, picturing the defeat of the same Robert II of Artois in the battle, may have been sent to him containing some gifts to stimulate the signing of a treaty between England and Flanders.

== Reproduction ==
A full-sized reconstruction of the original is displayed at the Kortrijk 1302 Museum in Belgium where it is known as the "Oxford Chest" (Kist van Oxford). This reproduction comprises a reconstruction of the whole chest including the stiles or legs supporting it, as would have been present in its original form but are missing from the remains of the original.

== Scenes ==
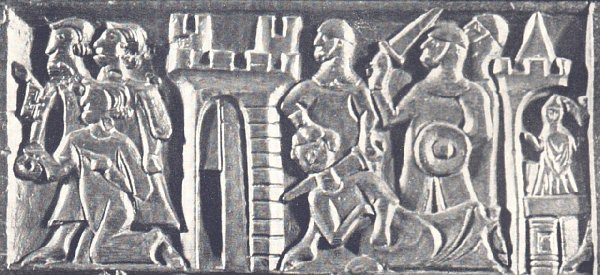
Top strip, scene on the right

=== Top strip ===
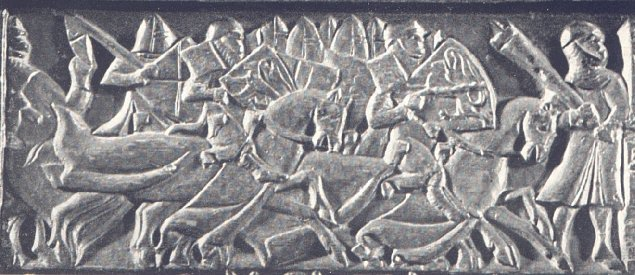
Top strip, scene on the left

At the extreme right there is a tower with merlons, housing an altar with a statue of a saint. A person is laying his hand on the head of the statue. The scene to the left of this tower shows three warriors with helmets and armed with swords. One of the warriors is equipped with a buckler, another is cutting the throat of a victim wearing a long dress and lying on the ground. This scene refers to the Matins of Bruges. The third scene show a tower with merlons and a gate, which is closed by two doors but one door contains a smaller, open entrance. Three civilans are facing the arrival of the party of mounted man shown on the left side of the top strip. One of these civilians is kneeling and offering the key of the city of Bruges to the group of knights arriving from the left side.

The left side of the strip is showing a group of horseman on the way to Bruges, preceded by a militia man armed with a goedendag. The most prominent horseman are Guy of Namur and William of Jülich which are identified by the heraldic lion rampant on their shield. The shoulder plate of Guy is showing the same heraldic figure as on the shield, whilst the shoulder plate of William is showing five globes. They are both wearing the same helmets as the militia man, whilst other knights are wearing closed helmets. Three other knights are showing heraldic signs on their shield, but only the one with the cross is identified as Henry of Lontzen, a veteran of the Battle of Worringen.

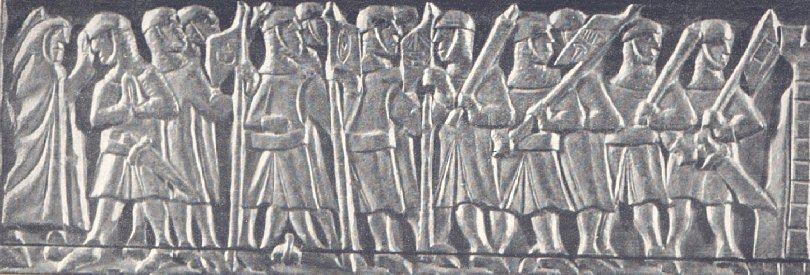
Second strip, scene on the left

=== Second strip ===
At the extreme left a priest is giving his blessing to a militia man. On the left side the some Flemish militia are shown with five banners, the militia men are armed with goedendags. The banners show a flying shuttle, representing the guild of the weavers, a ship representing the guild of the shippers, a comb representing the guild of the fullers, a barrel and drill representing the guild of the wine controllers, a sled representing the guild of the wine transporters.

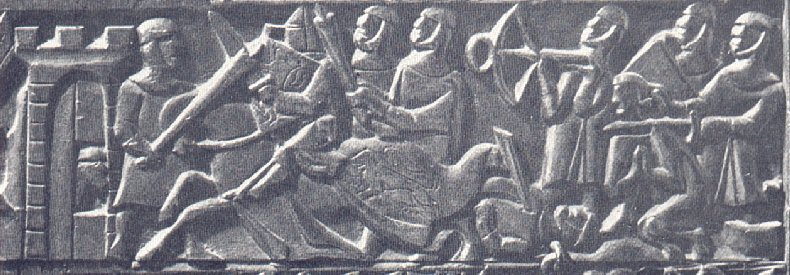
Second strip, scene on the right

The right side of the strip shows a battle scene. A non-identified knight with a closed helm and a lion rampant as heraldic depiction on his shield is fighting a militia man armed with a goedendag, whilst two other militia man attack him from behind. At the right of this battle scene, three more militia man are depicted: one aiming his crossbow, a second is holding a shield with unidentified heraldic signs, and a third is killing with a sword, a man begging for mercy on his knees and with folded hands. On the ground lies a soldier killed with a sword. The battle scene is observed from the left by a soldier, looking out of a window in the closed doors of a gate in tower with merlons. This scene probably refers to the siege of the Wijnendale Castle in June 1302, where the schout of Torhout was executed after the castle surrendered.

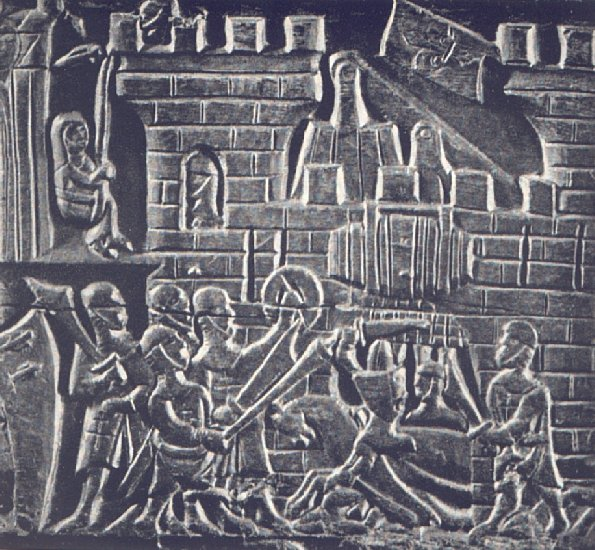
Strip three and four, scene on the left

=== Third and fourth strip left side ===
The left side of the third and fourth strip are merged to show a large depiction of the castle of Courtrai. The castle was built on the orders of the French king just 2 years before, it had a rectangular Floor plan with semi-circular towers on the corners. The castle is depicted with a gate and two towers, the tower on the right carrying the banner of the King of France and the Castellan of Lens. Between the towers of the castle, a catapult is shown, which was used to throw stones in the city of Courtrai during the siege preceding the battle of the Golden Spurs. Above the gate there is a barrel hanging from two ropes, obiously a trap for besiegers trying to enter the gate. On the left tower, a soldier is assisting a man to escape by lowering a rope, whilst a third man is obsering the escape attempt through a window in the tower. Through the castle gate with the partially raised portcullis, a knight is charging toward the besiegers of the castle. The patriarchal cross on the clothes of the besiegers identify them as belonging to the militia of Ypres. They are armed with goedendags, falchions and bucklers. At the left there is a man-high shield with two arrows sticking out of it, and to the left of the castle, a house of the city of Courtrai is also shown with an arrow sticking out of it. During the siege of the castle, the French soldiers tried to set the city of Courtrai afire by shooting burning arrows in the roofs of the houses.

=== Third strip right side ===
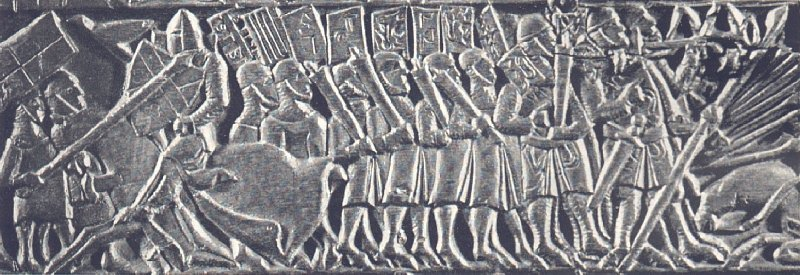
Strip three, scene on the right

At the left side three militia men are attacking Jan van Sijsele, an Flemish nobleman fighting on the French side. Jan van Sijsele is protecting himself with a shield showing his heraldics, and is trying to remain in the saddle by holding his left hand to the saddle. One militia man attacks him with a pike, the second one wounds Jan's horse with a sword and the third militia man is backing the two others.

The right side shows the battle line of the Flemish militia. At the front of the battle line are the two Flemish commanders Guy of Namur and William Of Jülich, each wearing an open helmet and identifiable by the heraldics on their shoulder plate and clothes. Guy is carrying a sword on his belt, and securing a pike on the ground with his foot. William is armed with a goedendag. Behind them are militiamen, all carrying goedendags and wearing a helmet. The banners carried by these men include the banner of Pieter de Coninck (a cross with four crowns), Guy of Namur, William of Jülich, the guild of carpenters (two axes), the guild of blacksmiths (Mallet and Horseshoe), the guild of brokers (vertical stripes) and the guild of bricklayers (masonry trowel and steel square). There is one unidentified banner depicting a lion. Both William and Guy are dismounted and are fighting on foot together with the militiamen. At the extreme right only a part of a dead French horse is visible, lying in front of a wall of pikes. Behind the pikes there is an archer and two crossbows.

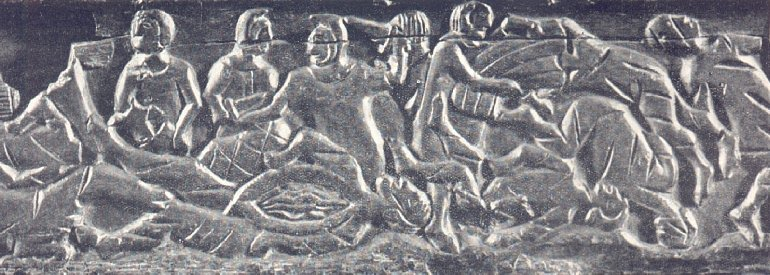
Strip four, scene on the right

=== Fourth strip right side ===
The post battle scene is showing the victors and dead on the battlefield. One militia man is taking the clothes of a killed Frenchman, another is carrying a helmet on his right arm. Two others are disputing the spoils with drawn knives. Several man with sword wounds are lying dead on the ground and one man is decapitated.

== See also ==
- Annals of Ghent

== Bibliography ==
- Ffoulkes, Charles (July 1912). "Carved Chest at New College, Oxford". The Burlington Magazine for Connoisseurs. 21 (112). JSTOR 859053.
- Vallance, Aymer (June 1912). "Early Furniture-I. Coffers". The Burlington Magazine for Connoisseurs. 21 (111).
- Mason, Joseph W. (2022). "Reflections on Medieval Art, Politics, and the Courtrai Chest". New College Notes. 17 (3). ISSN 2517-6935.
- van Caenegem, Raoul C. (2002). 1302 Geiten & Mythen van de Guldensporenslag [1302 Facts & Myths about the battle of the golden spurs] (in Dutch). Antwerpen: Mercatorfonds. ISBN 9061535166.
- Verbruggen, J.F.; Falter, Rolf (2001). 1302 Opstand in Vlaanderen [1302 Revolt in Flanders] (in Dutch). Tielt: Lannoo. ISBN 9020944126.
- "Exhibitions and Art Projects". New College Oxford.
