= Bruges Matins (football) =

Bruges Matins Brugse Metten
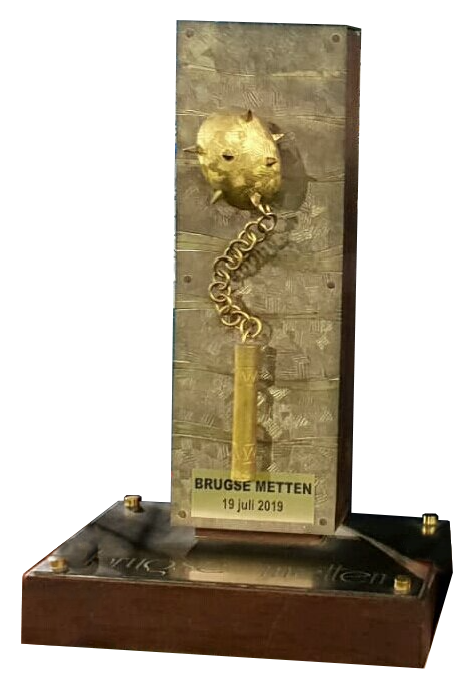
- The Goedendag Trophy awarded to the winners.
- Founded: 1976
- Region: Bruges
- Number of teams: 2 (1991, 1993-); 4 (1976–90, 1992)
- Current champions: (Netherlands) AZ
- Most successful club(s): (Belgium) Club Brugge (21 titles)

The Bruges Matins (Dutch: Brugse Metten, French: Matines Brugeoises) is a yearly friendly tournament organised by the Belgian football club Club Brugge KV.

The name of the tournament refers to the nocturnal massacre in Bruges in 1302, which is called the Bruges Matins. The tournament was first organised in 1976 as a four-team competition. However, since 1991, with the exception of 1992, it was reduced to just a one-match tournament between Club Brugge and another team. Normally, teams from abroad are invited, but sometimes other Belgian teams take part. On two occasions, a national team was present, namely Senegal in 1985 and Morocco in 1987. In case Club Brugge play in the Belgian Super Cup, the match won't be organised that season.

The winner of the tournament wins a trophy called Goedendag, which is an alternative name of the medieval club-like weapon more commonly known under the name Morning star. As a result, the tournament is sometimes also called "The Goedendag Trophy".

== Matches ==
Note: In case of a draw, penalties usually decided the winner. However, both in 1991 and 2014 the game ended in a draw and no winner was declared.

Year	Winner	Runner-up	Result
2024	Not held due to scheduling conflict with 2024 Belgian Super Cup.		
2023	(Netherlands) AZ	(Belgium) Club Brugge	2–1
2022	Not held due to scheduling conflict with 2022 Belgian Super Cup.		
2021	Not held due to scheduling conflict with 2021 Belgian Super Cup.		
2020	(Belgium) Club Brugge	(France) Lille	2–0
2019	(Belgium) Club Brugge	(Portugal) Sporting CP	2–2 (pen. 4–3)
2018	Not held due to scheduling conflict with 2018 Belgian Super Cup.		
2017	(Spain) Athletic Bilbao	(Belgium) Club Brugge	2–0
2016	Not held due to scheduling conflict with 2016 Belgian Super Cup.		
2015	Not held due to scheduling conflict with 2015 Belgian Super Cup and 2015–16 UEFA Champions League qualifying.		
2014	Draw between (Belgium) Club Brugge and (France) Bordeaux		0–0
2013	(Belgium) Club Brugge	(Germany) Wolfsburg	2–1
2012	(Belgium) Club Brugge	(Germany) Dortmund	3–1
2011	(Belgium) Club Brugge	(Germany) Leverkusen	2–1
2010	Not held because of construction of field heating in the Jan Breydelstadion.		
2009	(Belgium) Club Brugge	(Netherlands) AZ	1–0
2008	(Belgium) Club Brugge	(France) Lille	4–1
2007	(Belgium) Club Brugge	(Spain) Valladolid	2–2 (pen. 5–4)
2006	(Belgium) Club Brugge	(France) Paris Saint-Germain	2–0
2005	(Portugal) Porto	(Belgium) Club Brugge	2–2 (pen. 6–5)
2004	(Belgium) Club Brugge	(France) Auxerre	3–1
2003	(France) Monaco	(Belgium) Club Brugge	3–0
2002	(France) Lens	(Belgium) Club Brugge	1–0
2001	(Belgium) Club Brugge	(Spain) Rayo Vallecano	2–2 (pen. 5–3)
2000	(Belgium) Club Brugge	(Netherlands) PSV Eindhoven	4–0
1999	(Germany) Kaiserslautern	(Belgium) Club Brugge	3–2
1998	(Belgium) Club Brugge	(Germany) Dortmund	2–1
1997	(Netherlands) Ajax	(Belgium) Club Brugge	4–1
1996	(Belgium) Club Brugge	(France) Paris Saint-Germain	2–0
1995	(Belgium) Club Brugge	(Croatia) Hajduk Split	4–0
1994	(Netherlands) Ajax	(Belgium) Club Brugge	3–3 (pen. 5–4)
1993	(Belgium) Club Brugge	(Brazil) Flamengo	2–0
1992	(Belgium) Club Brugge	(Germany) Leverkusen	4–2
1991	Draw between (Belgium) Club Brugge and (Spain) Barcelona		1–1
1990	(Belgium) Club Brugge	(Belgium) Anderlecht	3–1
1989	(Soviet Union) Torpedo Moscow	(Netherlands) PSV Eindhoven	1–0
1988	(Belgium) Anderlecht	(Belgium) Club Brugge	3–1
1987	(Romania) Steaua București	Morocco	2–0
1986	(Soviet Union) Spartak Moscow	(Belgium) Club Brugge	2–1
1985	(Belgium) Anderlecht	(Belgium) Club Brugge	2–1
1984	(Belgium) Club Brugge	(Hungary) Újpest	2–0
1983	(Poland) Pogoń Szczecin	(West Germany) Borussia Dortmund	2–0
1982	(Belgium) Lokeren	(Belgium) Club Brugge	3–3 (pen. 4–2)
1981	(Belgium) Club Brugge	(Belgium) Lierse	3–1
1980	(Socialist Federal Republic of Yugoslavia) Sarajevo	(Belgium) Club Brugge	4–3
1979	(Belgium) Club Brugge	(England) Manchester City	3–2
1978	(Netherlands) AZ	(England) Ipswich Town	2–0
1977	(England) Queens Park Rangers	(England) Derby County	2–1
1976	(Socialist Federal Republic of Yugoslavia) Hajduk Split	(Austria) Rapid Wien	6–0
