= Wijnendale Castle =

Historic residence in Belgium

- Château de Wynendaele; Kasteel van Wijnendale
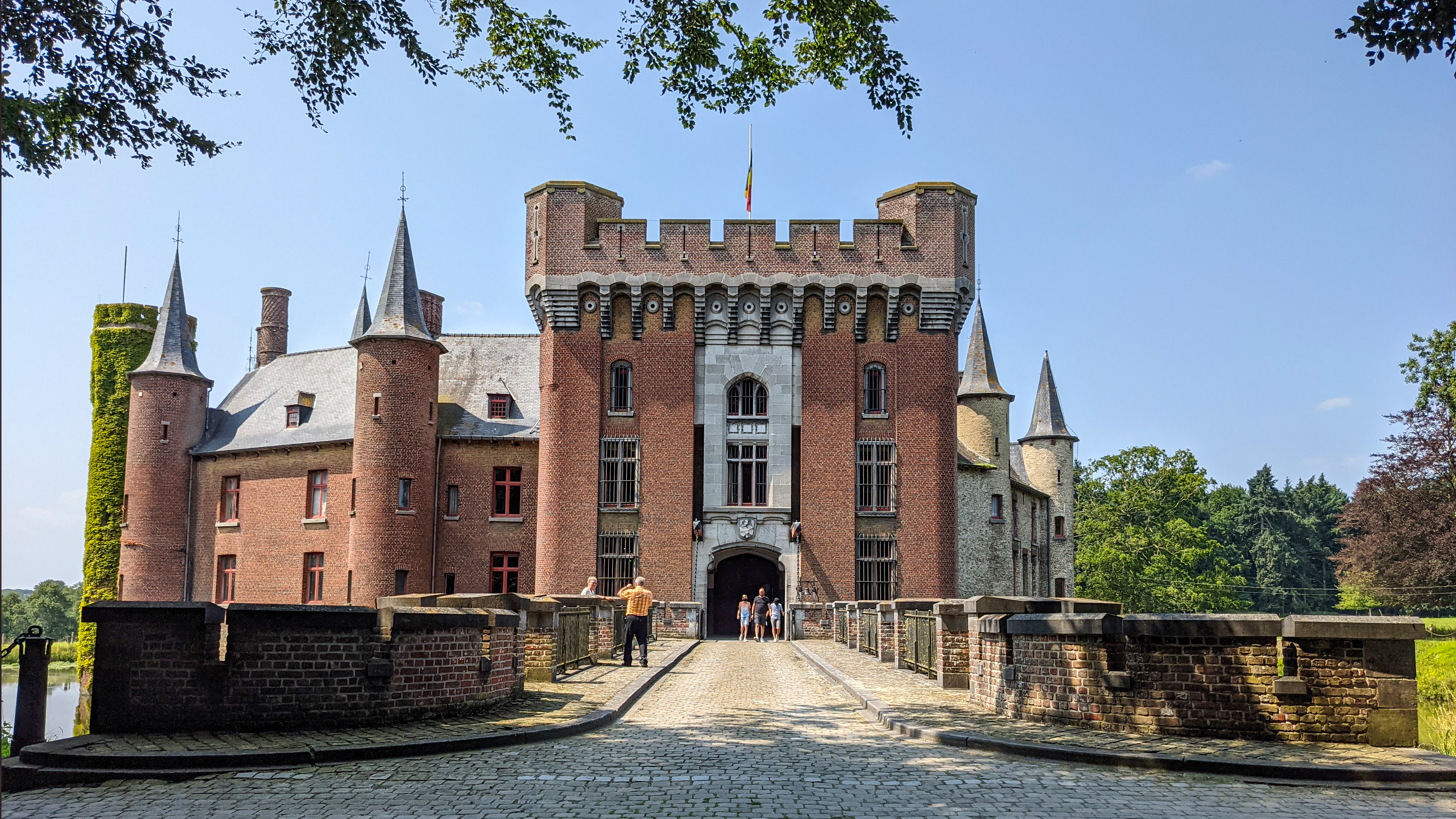
- Wijnendale Castle (21 July 2021)

- Location within Belgium
- Established: 15th century
- Location: Torhout, West Flanders, Belgium
- Coordinates: 51.078925°N 3.059483°E
- Type: Castle
- Owner: Jean-Jacques Matthieu de Wynendaele
- Parking: On site
- Website: City of Torhout official website

Wijnendale Castle (Dutch: Kasteel van Wijnendale, French: Château de Wynendaele) is a historic residence in Wijnendale, West Flanders in Belgium which was once a medieval castle. The present buildings largely date to a nineteenth century restoration, though parts of the north wing still date to the fifteenth century. One wing is currently inhabited by the present owners of the castle, while another is open to the public as a museum.

== History ==
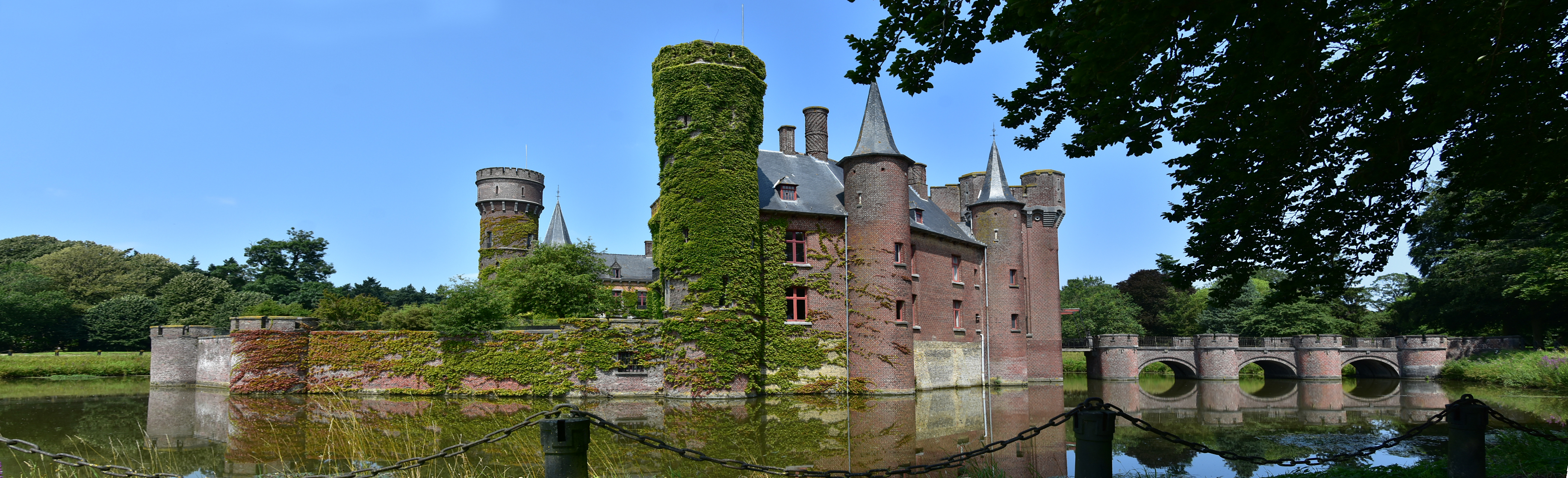
Wijnendale Castle (21 July 2021)

=== Counts of Flanders and Namur, 11th–14th century ===
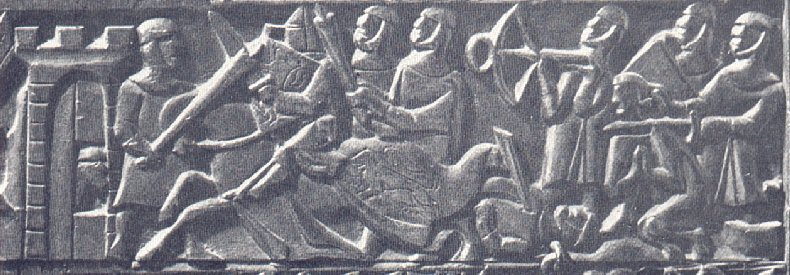
Depiction of the siege of Wijnendale Castle during the Franco-Flemish War on the Oxford Chest

The first castle was built by Robert I, Count of Flanders, at the end of the 11th century and used as a base for military operations.

In the 12th and 13th century, Wijnendale became a regular place of residence for the Counts of Flanders and for Philip, Count of Flanders, in particular. In 1297 Guy of Dampierre signed a treaty here with the English King Edward I.

In 1298 Wijnendale was inherited by the Counts of Namur, and besieged and damaged in 1302 and 1325. It is probable that Blanche of Namur grew up here and that it was here that she met her future husband Magnus IV of Sweden in 1334.

=== Dukes of Burgundy, Cleves and Ravenstein, 15th–16th century ===
After a period of neglect, Count John III of Namur sold the fiefdom and castle in 1407 to John the Fearless, Duke of Burgundy, who gave it 3 years later to his son-in-law Adolph I, Duke of Cleves, as part of the dowry on his marriage to John's daughter Mary of Burgundy, the elder.

In 1463 the castle passed to the Lords of Ravenstein, a junior branch of the House of Cleves. Adolph of Cleves, Lord of Ravenstein, and his son Philip of Cleves-Ravenstein transformed the castle into a beautiful mansion.

Adolf had married, as his second wife, Anne, an illegitimate aunt and governess of Mary of Burgundy, who stayed from time to time at Wijnendale, as did her son Philip the Handsome. In 1482 Mary died of a fall from her horse here, an accident which changed the history of the Low Countries: under her authoritarian husband Maximilian I, Holy Roman Emperor, a period of more than 300 years of Habsburg rule began.

In 1528, after the death of Philip of Cleves, Lord of Ravenstein, Wijnendale returned to the main branch of the Dukes of Cleves. Their relatives Charles V and Mary of Habsburg stayed more than once at the castle.

In the second half of the 16th century, the Dukes lost interest in their Flemish possessions and in 1578 part of the castle was burned down by Protestants.

=== Dukes of Pfalz-Neuburg, 17th–18th century ===
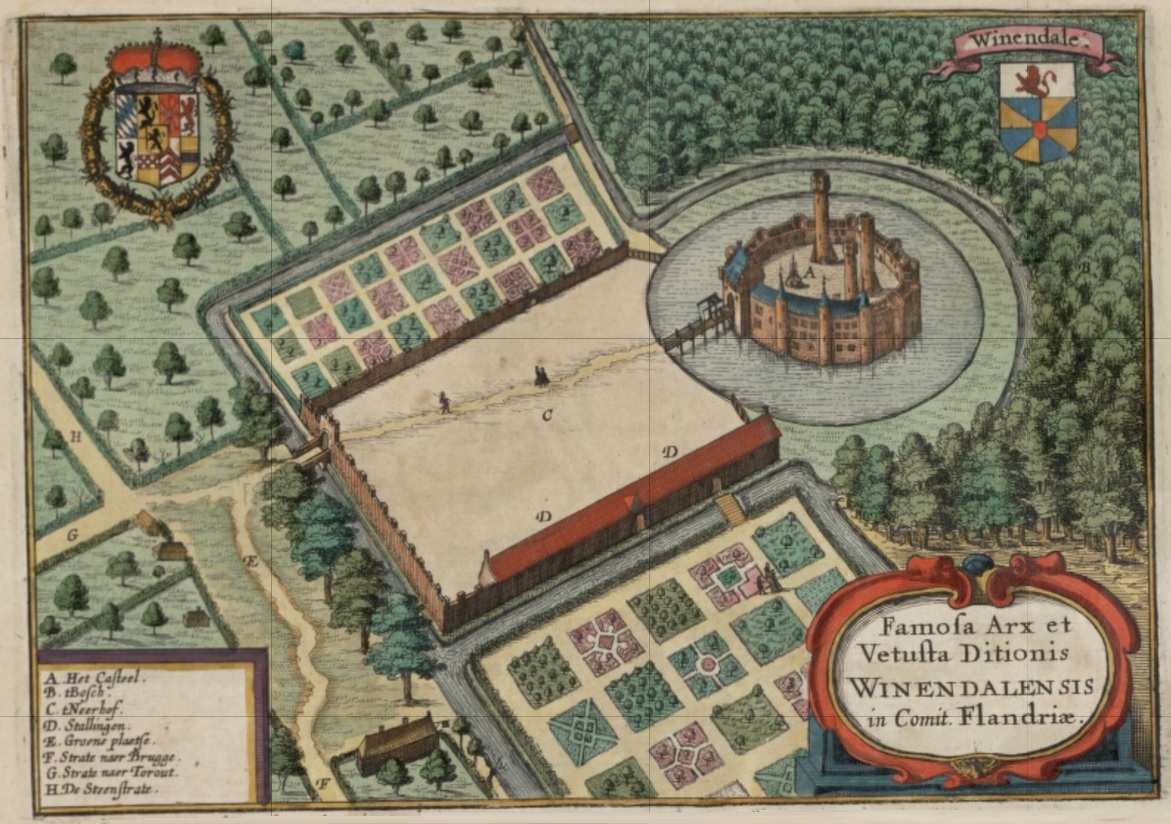
An illustration of the castle from Flandria Illustrata (1641)

In 1609 Duke John William of Cleves died without children and after the War of the Jülich succession in the Treaty of Xanten, the Fiefdom of Wijnendale passed to one of the victors, Wolfgang Wilhelm, Count Palatine of Neuburg, as confirmed in 1634 by the Privy Council of the Habsburg Netherlands and in 1666 by the Treaty of Cleves.

During the many attacks by Louis XIV on Flanders, Wijnendale was occupied many times by passing troops and severely damaged in 1690, when French troops blew up part of the castle. In 1699–1700 Duke Johann Wilhelm had the castle rebuilt.

On 28 September 1708, during the War of Spanish Succession, a battle took place between French and allied troops at Wijnendale which ended in an allied victory. The castle was not damaged.

In the 17th and 18th century it was inhabited by a governor, as the Dukes of Pfalz-Neuburg resided in Germany. In the middle of the 18th century, Duke Charles Theodore constructed roads in West Flanders to improve trade, with Wijnendale in the center.

=== French and Dutch period ===
In 1792 the French Revolutionary armies invaded the Austrian Netherlands and ended the feudal system. Charles Theodore moved the contents of the castle to his residences in Düsseldorf, Mannheim and Munich. The castle became the property of the French state. In 1811 the French troops damaged it so badly that only ruins remained.

In 1825, during the Dutch period the estate was sold to a Walloon industrial group, which had all the trees cut down, before going bankrupt.

=== Family of Matthieu (de Wynendaele), 19th–21st century ===
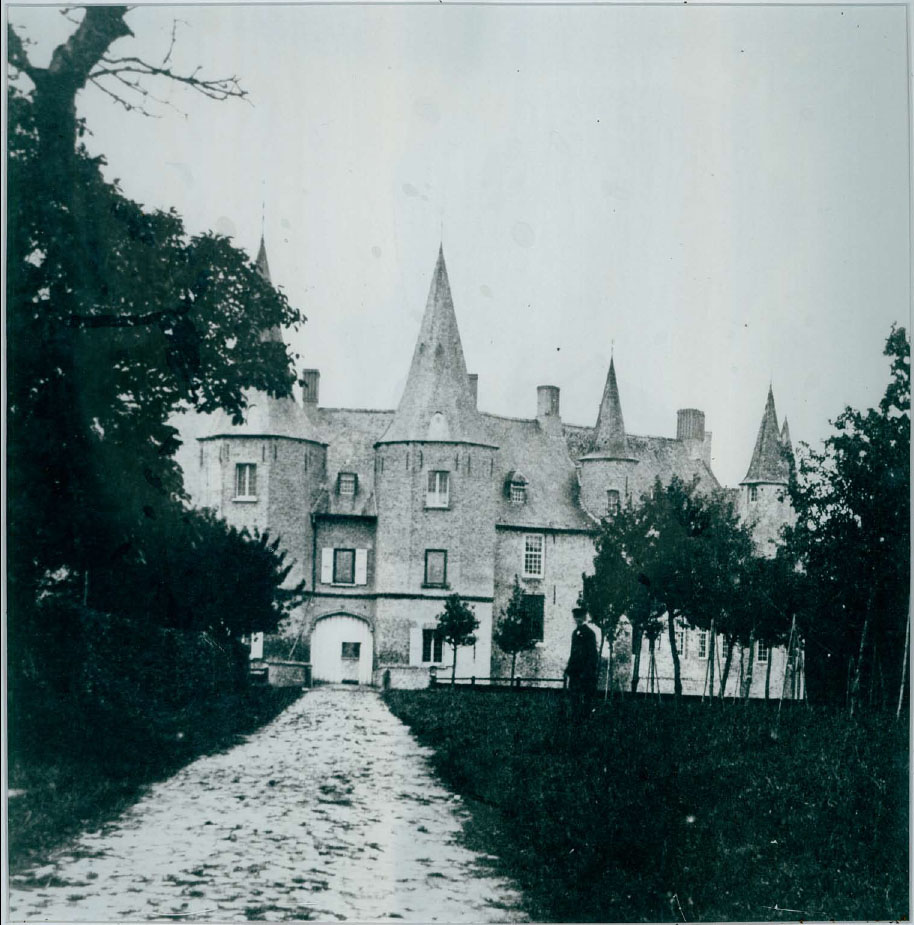
Wijnendale Castle in 1852

In 1833 the domain was bought by Josse-Pierre Matthieu, of the Brussels-based Matthieu banking family, who had the castle rebuilt between 1837 and 1852. His son Jules Joseph Louis Matthieu modified it in 1877 and gave it its present romanticized, mediaeval form.

In May 1940 Wijnendale made history again. On 25 May, just before the Battle of Dunkirk, there was a last meeting between King Leopold III of Belgium and four cabinet ministers (Prime Minister Hubert Pierlot, Minister of Foreign Affairs Paul-Henri Spaak, Minister of Internal Affairs Arthur Vanderpoorten and Minister of Defence Denis). With the country surrounded by German troops, capitulation was inevitable. The King however refused to follow his ministers to Britain to continue the struggle from there. He chose as commander-in-chief to remain with his troops and follow them into captivity. This decision led to strong controversy after the war, and to Leopold's abdication in 1951.

The Matthieu family (known since 1953 as "Matthieu de Wynendaele") still owns the castle today. The present owner is Jean-Jacques Matthieu de Wynendaele.

== See also ==
- List of castles in Belgium
