= Battle of Mons-en-Pévèle =

1304 battle of the Franco-Flemish War

- Part of the Franco-Flemish War
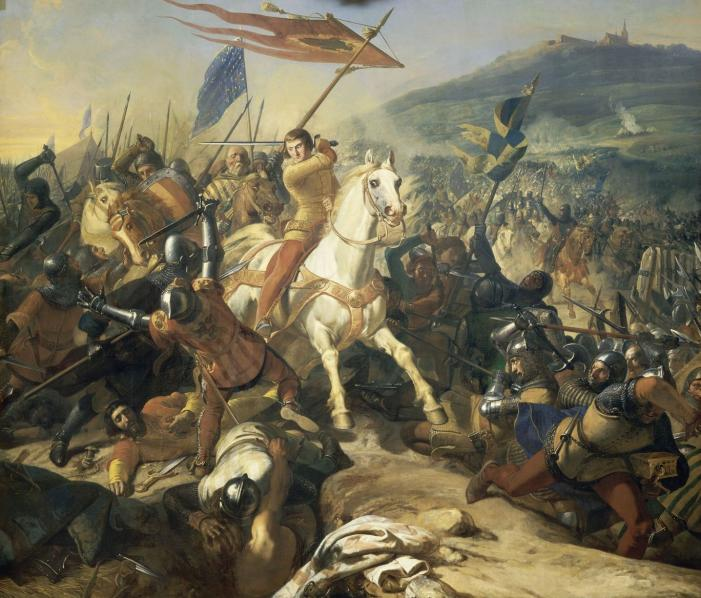
- The Battle of Mons-en-Pévèle, by Charles Philippe Larivière (1839)
Date	18 August 1304
Location	Mons-en-Pévèle, County of Flanders (modern France)
Result	French victory Treaty of Athis-sur-Orge

Belligerents
Kingdom of France	County of Flanders

Commanders and leaders
Philip IV; Foulques du Merle	William of Jülich †; Philip of Chieti; John I of Namur

Strength
3,000 knights 10,000 infantry	12,000–15,000 infantry

Casualties and losses
1,800–7,000	1,500–8,000

The Battle of Mons-en-Pévèle (or Pevelenberg) was fought on 18 August 1304 between the French and the Flemish. The French were led by their king, Philip IV.

== Prelude ==
The French king wanted revenge for the defeat in Battle of the Golden Spurs in 1302 after which the Flemish retook Douai and Lille. By early 1304, the French king was ready to attack the Flemish rebels. The French army, led by the king himself and by Foulques du Merle, marched north to attack William of Julich's force, and the French navy sailed to Zeeland to unite with the army of Hainault and Holland. It was the combined northern force in Zeeland that struck the first blow on 10–11 August, when it soundly defeated Guy of Namur's army and navy at the Battle of Zierikzee. Guy was captured, and the Flemish conquest of Holland was halted.

Philip of Chieti, son of Guy, Count of Flanders, had gathered a strong Flemish army to stop the French invasion and taken up positions on Mons-en-Pévèle.

== Battle ==
After a day of fighting, the outcome was undecided and negotiations were opened between 17:00 and 18:30. When a French force, under Guy de Saint-Pol, tried to surround the Flemish, it was pushed back. The furious Flemish then decided to launch a frontal attack and surprised the French, who thought that the battle was over for the day.

The Flemish had reached the royal tent and attacked Philip IV. He escaped only because some knights around him covered his flight and paid with their lives for the act. Assisted with mounting his horse, Philip counterattacked but had his horse killed under him. By then, William of Jülich had been killed in a counterattack that Philip had managed to launch.

As only the Flemish right wing had attacked, and the left wing under John I, Marquis of Namur was already leaving the battlefield, the Flemish right wing also withdrew.

The French chose not to pursue the Flemish.

During the Flemish attack on Philip, the oriflamme, a hugely symbolic and significant flag, was lost.

== Aftermath ==
Both sides claimed victory but the French had remained in possession of the battlefield, while the Flemish marched back to Lille. The French also captured Douai and Orchies and burned down Seclin.

After further minor engagements, the Treaty of Athis-sur-Orge was eventually signed on 23 June 1305 which recognized Flemish independence within the kingdom at the cost of the cities of Lille, Douai and Béthune, which were annexed by to the French royal domain, as well as the payment of exorbitant fines to King Philip IV.

In memory of the safe return of most of the militia man from Bruges, every year since 1305 the Brugse Belofte Procession is going out on 15 August, the Assumption of Mary.
