= Matins of Bruges =

1302 rebellion in Bruges

- Part of Franco-Flemish War
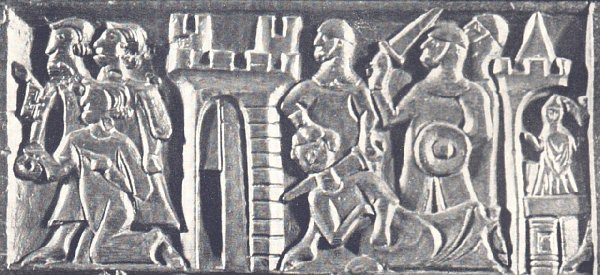
- Contemporary depiction of the Bruges Matins on the Oxford Chest.
Date	18 May 1302
Location	Bruges

Belligerents
Flemish rebels	Kingdom of France

Commanders and leaders
	Jacques de Châtillon; Pierre Flotte

Casualties and losses
	120 killed 85 captured

The Matins of Bruges (Dutch: Brugse Metten) was the nocturnal ambush of the French garrison in Bruges on 18 May 1302 by the members of the local Flemish militia. It has been named "Matins" in analogy to the Sicilian Vespers of 1282. The reasons for this rebellion go back to the previous year, when the after the annexation of the County of Flanders in 1300, King Philip IV of France made a Joyous entry in Bruges in 1301. There was social unrest when commoners protested against the new taxes that were levied to finance this huge event. The harsh reactions to this social unrest by the French governor Jacques de Châtillon escalated to a point where Jacques occupied the city with an army. Fearing for the worst, the town militia decided to act first and ambushed the French troops. The revolt reignated the Franco-Flemish War and led to the Battle of the Golden Spurs, which saw the Flemish militia defeat French troops on 11 July 1302.

== Background ==
When Philip the Fair became king in 1285, he changed the French policy in two ways: no more constant military campaigning like his father had done in Italy and Spain but instead opponents were challenged with legal arguments before the Parlement of Paris and no more campaigning abroad but instead reinforce the royal power within his kingdom by trying to subject the powerful vassals in the Duchy of Brittany, County of Champagne, Duchy of Aquitaine and County of Flanders. Through the parlement of Paris, Philip intervened in the conflict between Guy of Dampierre, Count of Flanders and the big towns of Flanders, Ghent, Bruges and Ypres. After much legalist action, Guy finally sought an alliance with the English King Edward I and renounced his fealty to Philip. This led to the Franco-Flemish War in 1297. Guy surrendered to Philip in 1300, and Jacques de Châtillon was appointed governor.

During the Franco-Flemish war, Bruges was sympathetic to the French cause: on 1 September 1297, when Edward I arrived in Bruges with his army, the city refused an offer by the English king to pay for the repair of its city walls, instead when Philip invaded Flanders, representatives of the town went on 18 September 1297 to Ingelmunster to offer the surrender of Bruges to the French king. Once it was occupied by the French, presents were sent to the French commanders and king, and Bruges let the French army fortify the city with a second, seven kilometer long city wall, which enclosed 430 ha (1,100 acres). In January 1300, Charles of Valois marched to Bruges with the French army and stayed there until March 1300, using Bruges as a base for raids towards Maldegem and Ghent.

== Prelude ==
The positive attitude towards the French started to shift when King Philip and Queen Joan made their joyous entry in Bruges between 29 May and 4 June 1301. Before going to Bruges, the royal pair had made a joyous entry in Ghent and on that occasion, the French king granted the abolishment of some taxes which were levied on food. As these taxes were a main source of income for the town and mostly paid by the lower class, the governors of Bruges which were higher class bourgeoisie sought a way to avoid similar grants fo their city. The government of Bruges declared that anybody asking a favour from the king, would be punished by death. As a result, when Philip made his joyous entry in Bruges, the crowd was silent and apathic, much to the astonishment of the French king.

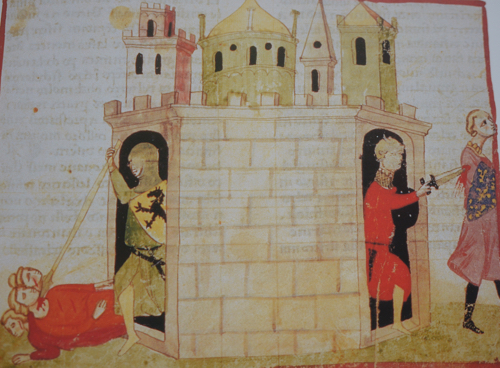
The Matins Of Bruges as depicted in the Nuova Cronica ca 1350

The government had organized a tournament, offered the king valuable presents and had bought extravagant clothes for the members of the bourgeoisie. There was some unrest and rioting when it became clear that all this had to be paid exclusively by the craft guilds and not by the bourgeoisie merchants. It is during this episode that Pieter de Coninck manifested himself for the first time with his eloquence as leader of the malcontent people. On the request of the city government, the French bailiff imprisonned him and twenty-five companions in Het Steen, the royal prison. The guilds then raised their militia and freed the prisoners. The situation escalated further when Jacques de Châtillon judged that the attack by the militia on the royal prison was a lèse-majesté which should be punished severely. He ordered the houses of the twenty-six escapees demolished and on 13 July called up an army of 500 horseman to execute the punishment. But the guilds' militia were vigilant and closed the gates of the town for Jacques de Châtillon. When Jacques de Châtillon returned with a larger army reinforced with Flemish knights and poorters from other Flemish cities, he could again not enter the town but nevertheless Jacques de Châtillon was able to enforce harsh measures upon Bruges: Pieter de Coninck and his sympathisers were exiled and their properties confiscated, 500 hostages were sent to Tournai, the recently built city walls were to be partially demolished, a castle to house a French garrison had to be built and the charter granted to the city in 1297 was revoked. These harsh measures drew the dissatisfaction of the people of Bruges away from their own government towards the French government, as these measures affected everybody and not just the rioters. Bruges appealed to the Parlement of Paris, but when this appeal was rejected in March 1302, it caused a new rebellion which enabled Pieter de Coninck to return and install a new city government, led by people from the guilds. The city government choose William of Jülich, a grandson of Guy, as their leader.

Jacques de Châtillon had first to deal with a similar revolt in Gent, where on 1 April the previously abolished taxes had been reinstated. On the advice of the chancellor of France Pierre Flotte, the conflict in Gent was resolved in a more diplomatic way on 11 May and as the people of Gent were relieved they escaped harsh punishment, they refused to join Bruges in the revolt. This setback caused alarm in Bruges where Pieter de Coninck and William of Jülich had to flee the city in order to make place for more moderate leaders. On 14 May, Jacques de Châtillon and Pierre Flotte appeared before Bruges with their army and the city was more inclined to negotiate then to fight.

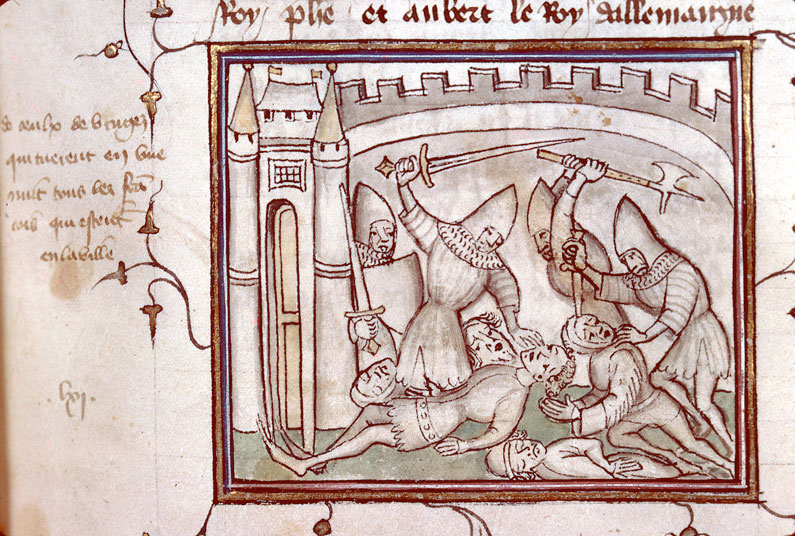
A 14th century depiction of the Matins of Bruges

== History ==
Pierre Flotte negotiated a surrender of Bruges: around 5000 rebels were allowed to flee the city to the nearby towns of Damme, Aardenburg and Oostburg, before Jacques de Châtillon entered the city on 17 May. But in violation of the terms of the surrender, he entered the city with the bulk of his army instead of the agreed 300 unarmed horseman. This caused great anxiety and believing that Jacques was going to take cruel revenge, the people of Bruges asked the rebels to return and deal with the French army. The rebels entered the city in early morning through gaps in the city walls, which had been partially torn the previous year down on the orders of Jacques. The rebels searched all houses for French soldiers and killed or captured anyone they could find. The rebels used the shibboleth: "schild en vriend", which means "shield and friend", to distinguish the French from the natives. Most of the French, including Pierre Flote and Jacques de Châtillon escaped the city, but around 120 were killed. Eighty-five nobleman and knights, including nineteen Flemish ones, were captured and later ransomed. Jacques de Châtillon escaped with the bulk of the survivors to the castle of Kortrijk On 23 May Pieter de Coninck and William of Jülich returned in triumph to Bruges. In absence of the count of Flanders, who was still imprisoned in France, William was appointed Advocatus (Flemish: Ruwaard) of the county of Flanders.

== Aftermath ==
King Philip vowed revenge and sent an army under the command of Robert II of Artois to put down the rebellion. Meanwhile, the Flemish towns raised their militia under the command of Guy's sons John and Guy of Namur, as well as his grandson William of Jülich, and the two forces clashed in the Battle of the Golden Spurs on 11 July 1302, which resulted in an unexpected victory for the Flemish.

The rebellion of 18 May has been named "Matins" (after a monastic liturgy) in analogy to the Sicilian Vespers of 1282, by modern historians.
