= Hilda Johnstone =

British historian (1882–1961)

Hilda Johnstone FRHS (1882–1961) was a British historian, and one of the first female professors in the London university system.

== Life ==
Hilda Johnstone, born in 1882 to Herbert and Sarah Anne Johnstone, was educated at Manchester High School for Girls from 1894 to 1899 and read History at Manchester University, graduating M.A. in 1906. She had two sisters, Edith and Mary (who became the wife of Thomas Tout); both attended Manchester High School for Girls. From 1906 to 1913 she was Assistant Lecturer in History at the Victoria University of Manchester, in 1913 becoming Reader in History at King's College London. During the First World War she worked in the War Trade Intelligence Department. In 1922 she was appointed professor of history, Royal Holloway College, University of London. She retired in 1942.

In retirement Johnstone became Honorary Archivist to the Bishop of Chichester, and Honorary Consultant on Ecclesiastical Archives to the Records Committee, West Sussex County Council. She died in 1961.

== Publications ==
- State Trials of the Reign of Edward the First, 1289–1293 (London, 1906).
- Oliver Cromwell and His Times ([1912])
- A Hundred Years of History from Record and Chronicle, 1216–1327 (Longmans and Co., London, 1912).
- Stories of Greece and Rome (Longmans and Co., London, 1914)
- "The Parliament of Lincoln of 1316", English Historical Review, 36/141 (1921), 53–57.
- The Wardrobe and Household of Henry, Son of Edward I (University Press, Manchester, 1923)
- Letters of Edward, Prince of Wales, 1304–1305 (Cambridge, 1931)
- France: The Last Capetians (1932)
- "The Eccentricities of Edward II", English Historical Review, 48/190 (1933), 264–267.
- A Short History of England (P. Varadachary and Co., Madras, 1934)
- English History for Beginners (P. Varadachary and Co., Madras, 1934)
- The Place of the Reign of Edward II in English History (Manchester, 1936)
- "The Chapel of St. Louis, Greyfriars, London", English Historical Review, 56/223 (1941), 447–450.
- Edward of Carnarvon, 1284–1307 (Manchester University Press, 1946).
- Churchwardens' Presentments, 17th Century: Archdeaconry of Chichester (Sussex Record Society, Lewes, 1948)
- Annals of Ghent (Thomas Nelson and Sons, London, 1951). Reissued Clarendon Press, Oxford, 1985.
- Alexander Hay: Historian of Chichester (Chichester, 1961)
