= Philip of Chieti =

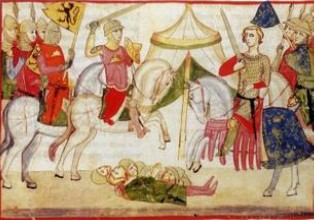
Battle of Mons-en-Pevele.jpg

Philip of Chieti (1263–1308) was the 8th and youngest child of Guy, Count of Flanders and his first wife Matilda of Béthune.

Philip was destined for a career in the church and studied for that purpose in Paris, where he met Charles of Anjou. Charles, the younger brother of King Louis IX of France, had just acquired the crown of Naples, and Philip traveled with him in his service to southern Italy. There he married in 1284 with Matilda of Courtenay (1254–1303), only child of the late Raoul de Courtenay, who had been made Count of Chieti and Loreto by Charles of Anjou as a reward for his part in the conquest of Naples.

Philip lived a good life as count of Chieti and Teano, until news reached him of the great Flemish victory in the Battle of the Golden Spurs. He was allowed by Charles of Anjou to travel to Flanders to support his family, but he had to abandon his titles in Italy.

When he returned to Flanders, he took over the regency over Flanders from his younger brother John I, Marquis of Namur, as his father and two elder brothers were still imprisoned in France. One of his first acts was the establishment of Flemish Bishoprics. The existing Bishoprics of Arras, Cambrai and Tournai were still under the influence of France, and excommunicated many Flemish nobles to break their resistance. Therefore Philip of Chieti sent his request to Pope Boniface VIII, well knowing that the Pope was in conflict with the King of France over his bull, Unam Sanctam. Unfortunately for Philip, Boniface died soon after.

On 18 August 1304, King Philip IV of France launched a new attack against Flanders, one week after the Flemish defeat in the Battle of Zierikzee, in which Guy of Namur was taken prisoner and John III, Lord of Renesse killed. Philip of Chieti took command over a strong Flemish army to stop the French invasion and fought the inconclusive Battle of Mons-en-Pévèle.

When the Treaty of Athis-sur-Orge was signed on 23 June 1305, his elder brother Robert III, Count of Flanders was released from captivity. Philip of Chieti transferred the regency to his brother and returned to Italy. Here he lived in poverty with his second wife Pérenelle de Milly and three small children. He died in November 1308 and was buried in Naples.

== Sources ==
- GHEERARDIJN, M., Filips van Chieti en Loreto, 2006
