= Plançon à picot =

Type of pole weapon

The plançon à picot, or simply plançon (also spelled planson), was a medieval infantry weapon designed for smashing and thrusting. It consisted of a stout iron-shod baseball-bat-like shaft (1–1.5 m (3 ft 3 in – 4 ft 11 in) in length) with a steel spike attached on top. It was cheap and easy to make, and was extremely efficient against heavily armoured opponents. The weapon was a relative of the goedendag, a popular weapon of Flemish militias of the 14th century. Given that the plançon à picot was recorded at several times as being carried alongside the goedendag, they may not be identical.
