= Siege of Tournai (1303) =

Event of the Franco-Flemish War in 1303

- Part of the Franco-Flemish War
Date	1303
Location	Tournai, France 50°36′20″N 03°23′17″E
Result	Negotiated lifting of the siege

Belligerents
Kingdom of France	County of Flanders

The siege of Tournai was an event of the Franco-Flemish War in 1303.

Following French defeat at the Battle of the Golden Spurs, the Flemish army entered France, burning the town of Thérouanne and laying siege to Tournai. A French army of 1,400 men led by Foulques du Merle and reinforced by soldiers of John II, Count of Holland, arrived to bolster the city's defences in June 1303. The Flemish campaign lasted forty-seven days.

The siege was ended by negotiations between Philip IV of France and the Flemish, in which the French agreed to release their prisoner, Guy, Count of Flanders, in return for the lifting of the siege.
