= Battle of Zierikzee =

1304 naval battle

Coordinates: 51°38′59″N 3°54′59″E

- Part of Franco-Flemish War
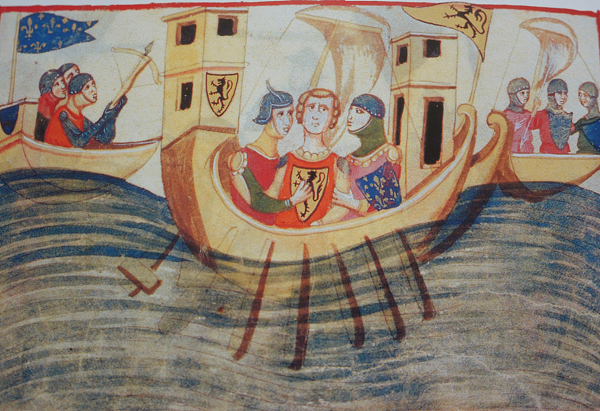
- The battle depicted in the contemporary Nuova Cronica
| Date | 10–11 August 1304 |
| Location | Zierikzee, County of Zeeland (modern Netherlands) |
| Result | Allied victory: Annihilation of the Flemish fleet |

Belligerents
| Kingdom of France; County of Holland; Republic of Genoa | County of Flanders |

Commanders and leaders
| Rainier I Grimaldi | Guy of Namur (POW) |

Strength
| 54 ships | 37 ships |

Casualties and losses
| Unknown | Unknown |

The battle of Zierikzee was a naval battle between a Flemish fleet and an allied Franco-Hollandic fleet which took place on 10 and 11 August 1304. The battle, fought near the town of Zierikzee, ended in a Franco-Dutch victory. The battle is part of a larger conflict between the Count of Flanders and his French feudal lord, King Philip IV of France (1296–1305).

== Flemish invasion of Hainaut, Zeeland and France ==
The County of Zeeland was an area that had been contested between the Count of Flanders and the Count of Holland since the 11th century. Originally granted in 1012 by Emperor Henry II to the count of Flanders Baldwin IV, by 1076 the area had become part of Holland but under Flemish overlordship. After the Flemish victory in the battle of the Golden Spurs, the Flemish attacked John II Avesnes, count of Holland, Zeeland and of Hainaut and conquered Lessines. The House of Dampierre and the House of Avesnes had been involved in a familial war for decades. In retaliation to the Flemish invasion of Hainaut John's son William plundered Cadzand.

In reaction to this raid, Guy of Namur, son of Guy I of Flanders, formed a fleet at Sluis, which sailed on 23 April 1303 to claim Zeeland for the Flemish. After Flemish landings near Arnemuiden and Veere the troops of William fled to Middelburg which surrendered on 9 May. After this the Flemings conquered the whole of Walcheren and several other islands. Only Zierikzee was held for the count of Holland. In July an armistice was arranged between the Flemings and the count of Holland.

Covered by an armistice in the north, the Flemings raised an army near Cassel, which entered France and attacked Saint-Omer, Terwaan and Tournai. In August Philip IV of France tried to raise a new army to counter this threat, but due to mutiny over arrears of pay he was forced to conclude an armistice until May 1304 with the Flemings, which was later extended to June. The armistice gave the French the opportunity to raise a new army in peace for the next campaigning season.

In the Spring of 1304 the armistice between the Flemings and Holland was broken. William attacked and defeated the Flemings near Castle Blodenburg. A fleet led by William and his uncle Guy of Avesnes, bishop of Utrecht however was defeated by the Flemings, the bishop being captured. After this victory, the Flemings invaded Holland and Utrecht. Seeing the Flemish success John II, Duke of Brabant then joined the Flemish cause. Dordrecht, led by Witte van Haemstede, a bastard son of count Floris V, brought the cities of Holland to the side of William and the Flemings retreated. After this Zierikzee, which was still held by Holland, was besieged.

== Battle of Zierikzee ==
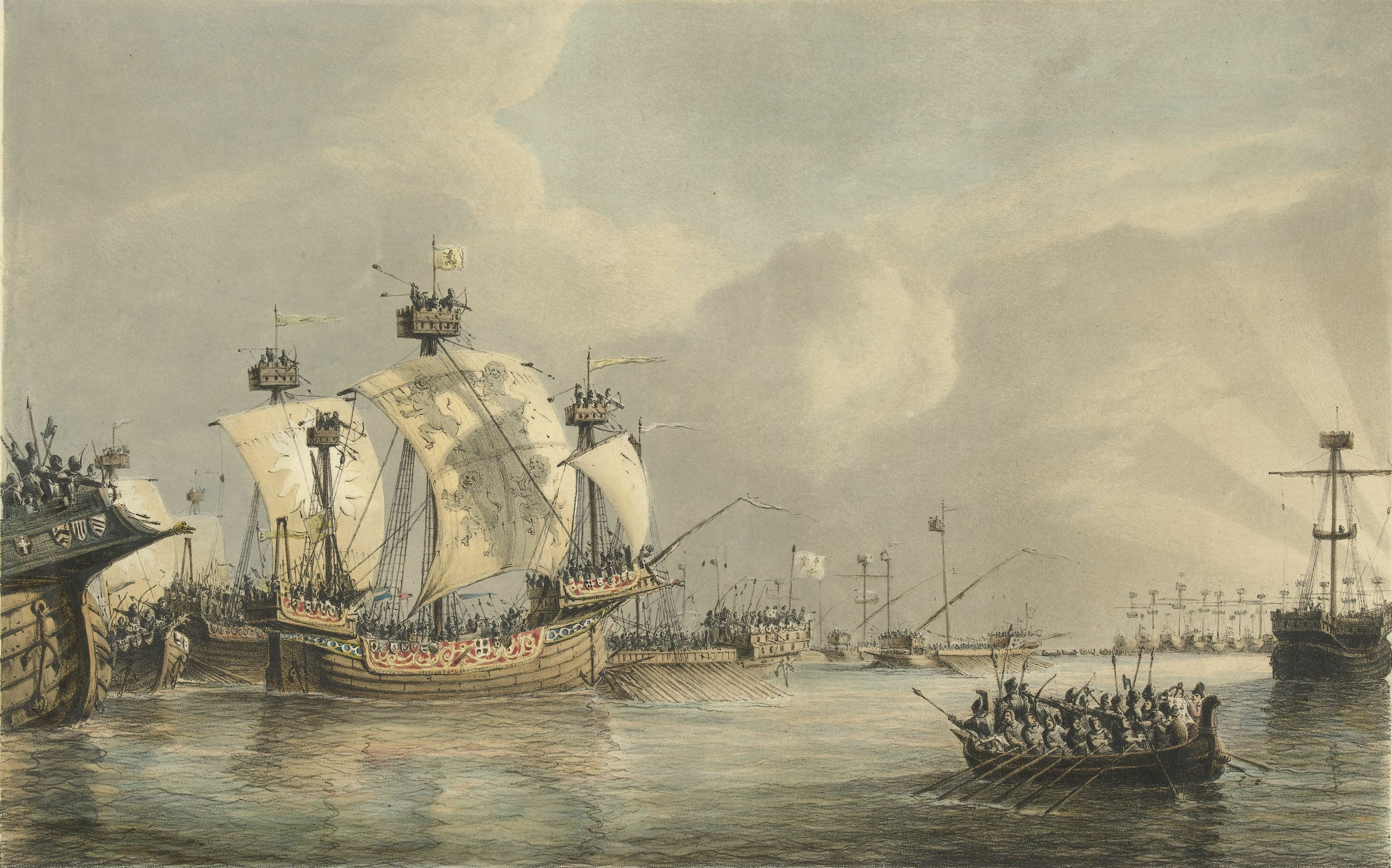
Zeeslag op de Gouwe, 1304. Scheeps-strijd op de Gouwe 11 Augustus 1304, print by Petrus Johannes Schotel (19th century)

Upon the end of the armistice between France and Flanders, Philip IV launched his army on Tournai and sent his fleet, led by Rainier Grimaldi, to aid the count of Holland. Grimaldi's fleet consisted of 30 French and eight Spanish cogs and 11 Genoese galleys. This fleet was joined at Schiedam by the small fleet of Holland, consisting of five more ships. This combined fleet then set sail for Zierikzee. Guy of Namur could count on a motley fleet of 37 Flemish, English, Hanseatic, Spanish, and Swedish ships, as well as numerous smaller vessels.

On the evening of August 10, the two fleets met on the Gouwe, back then a bay near Zierikzee. As the river was silted, maneuvering was hindered, which aided the smaller vessels of the Flemings. The Flemish tried a fire ship attack which failed when the vessels were blown back to the Flemish lines. At first the battle seemed to go to the Flemings as the larger French ships were immobilized by grounding. But when the tides changed, the larger French ships came free and joined the fight, turning the battle to Grimaldi's advantage.

The next morning, the Flemish ships were seen to aimlessly float, apparently sabotaged by a traitor who cut their moorings. As the Franco-Hollander fleet was still in battle array, it was able to easily put down further Flemish resistance.

== Consequences ==
As a result of the French victory, Guy of Namur was captured and the siege of Zierikzee was lifted. One week after the naval battle, on 18 August Philip IV himself was able to defeat the Flemish main army at the battle of Mons-en-Pévèle. On 22 August Count John II died and was succeeded as count of Hainaut, Holland and Zeeland by his son William.
