= Annals of Ghent =

Medieval chronicle from Flanders

The Annals of Ghent (Latin: Annales Gandenses) is a short medieval chronicle which is an important source on the history of the County of Flanders and, in particular, for the Franco-Flemish War (1297–1305) and Crusade of the Poor (1309). Written by an unknown Franciscan and named after the author's native city of Ghent, the text was written in Latin and covers the period between 1297 and 1310. According to the writer's own declaration, work on the chronicle began in 1308. Written by the author at an old age, the preface of the Annals opens:

One day when I was not busy, it occurred to me that as I enjoy reading and hearing stories and true facts about old times, and write quickly, and also had at my disposal a stock of small [parchment] membranes of no great value...I might set forth on them, in chronological order, in an easy, light, and clear style, those manifold battles and perils, distresses and oppressions of various kinds, expeditions, sieges, and attacks both passive and active, which had befallen our land of Flanders, and the divers happenings of my times - at all of which I was either present and an eye-witness, or else ascertained the facts with certainty from those who were present..."

The original manuscript of the Annals was preserved until the 19th century and was last attested at Hamburg in 1824, although several copies were made during the early modern period. An English translation was published in 1951 by the historian Hilda Johnstone, and reissued in 1985.

== See also ==
- Courtrai Chest
