= Goedendag =

Medieval pole weapon

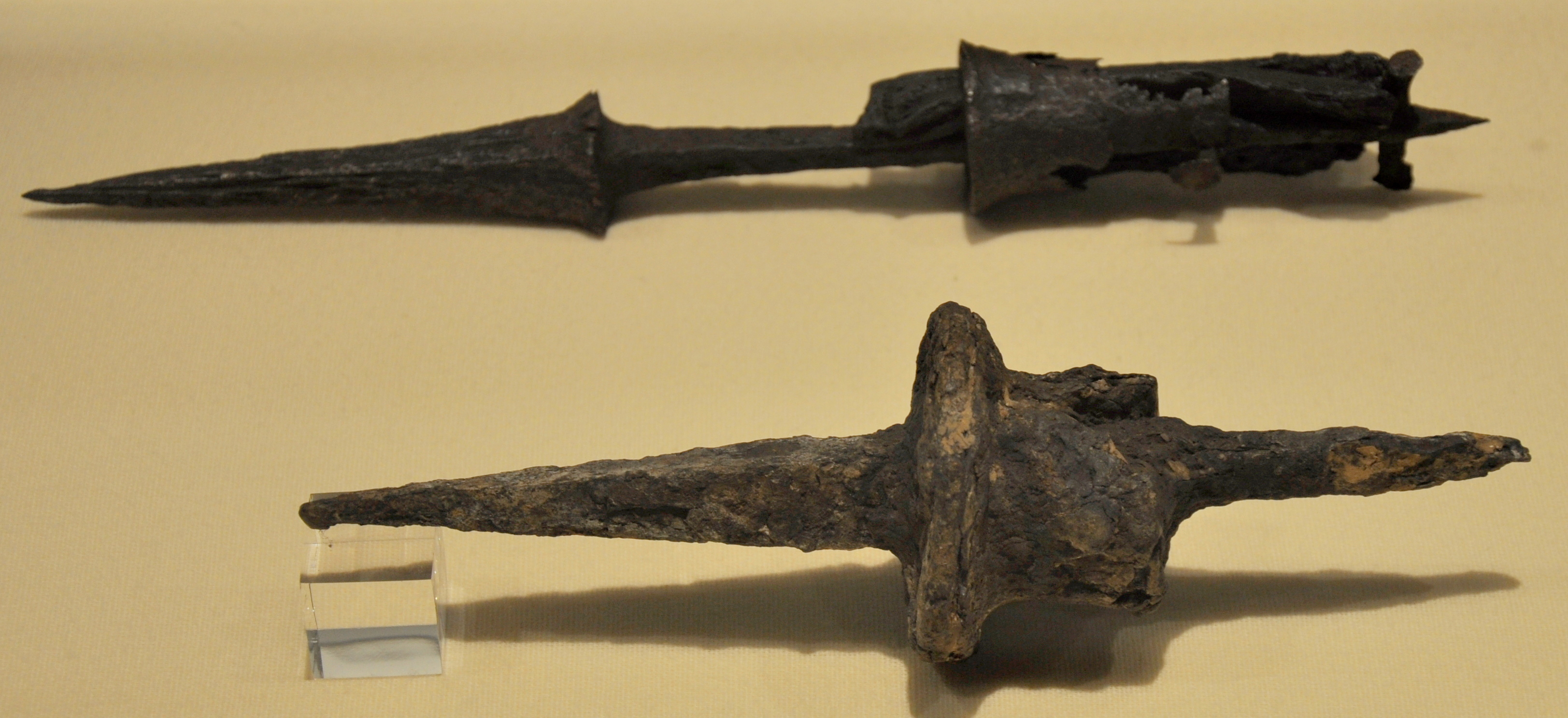
Remains of original goedendags in the Kortrijk 1302 museum, Kortrijk, Belgium

A goedendag ([ɣudə(n)ˈdaːɣ] lit. 'good day' in Dutch; also rendered godendac, godendard, godendart, and sometimes conflated with the related plançon) was a weapon originally used by the militias of Medieval Flanders in the 14th century, notably during the Franco-Flemish War. The goedendag was essentially a combination of a club with a spear. Its body was a wooden staff roughly 90 cm to 150 cm (3 to 5 feet) long with a diameter of roughly 5 cm to 10 cm (2 to 4 inches). It was wider at one end, and at this end a sharp metal spike was inserted by a tang.

The weapon was used to great effect by the guildsmen of Flanders' wealthy cities against the French knights at the Battle of the Golden Spurs near Kortrijk (Courtrai) on 11 July 1302. The goedendag is frequently seen in the hands of Flemish militia in contemporary depictions of the battle, such as the carvings on the Courtrai Chest, a 14th-century wooden chest. It is also seen on a paper copy of a lost fresco from the Leugemeete in Ghent.

== Name ==
The origin of the weapon's name "goedendag" has different theories.

One is that it may have derived from French descriptions of the Flemish weapon. Guillaume Guiart mentions of a Tiex bostons qu'ils portent en querre ont nom godendac ("... a weapon called godendac") which happens to be cognate with the Dutch translation of goedendag, which means "good day". Allegedly this is a reference to the Bruges Matins massacre in 1302, at which the guildsmen of Bruges purportedly took over the city by greeting people in the streets, and murdering anyone who answered with a French accent. This derivation of the name may however be spurious. The Flemish themselves referred to the weapon as a "spiked staff" (gepinde staf).

Another theory is that the "dac" or "dag" is related to Germanic root dagger/dolk, so instead of "good day" it may have meant "good dagger".

== Use ==
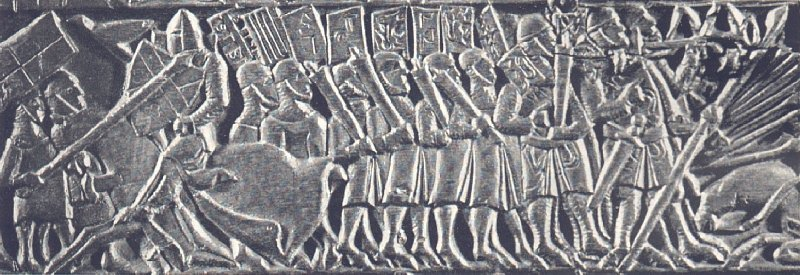
The troops in the center of the column are using the goedendag. Pikemen are on either end. Depiction from the Courtrai Chest.

Exactly how the weapon was used is a source of debate. Contemporary illustrations show it being used as a club but the contemporary chronicler Guillaume Guiart, speaking of the battle of Courtrai, states, "each held his godendart raised against the French, the iron as one meets a wild boar". which suggests it was first used as a spear to meet a charge, then a club as the enemy was halted. The goedendag was probably set in the ground secured by the fighter's foot and aimed with both hands. The thicker knob under the spike, a safeguard against the horse impaling itself and then going on to crash into the defender, served the same purpose as the cross bar on a boar-spear. The military historian Kelly DeVries asserts that "its chief function was to bring down a knight from his horse". Verbruggen describes the role of the goedendag thus: "They were placed between the pikemen, or in the second rank, so that with their shorter, very heavy weapons they could put the horses out of action.

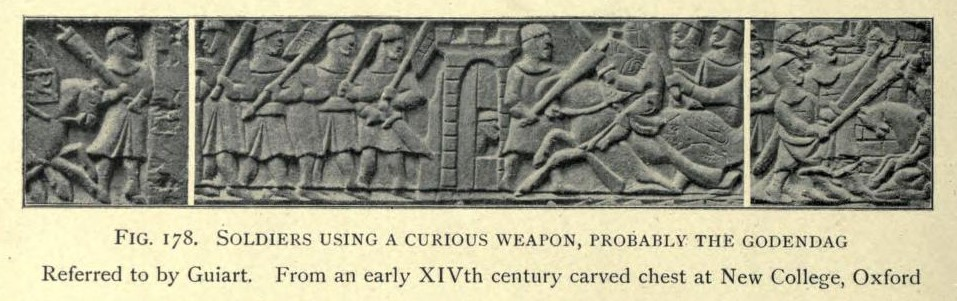
Soldiers using the goedendag: From an early 14th century carved chest.

The Courtrai Chest shows men with goedendags standing behind a line of men with pikes.

Other clubs, maces, swords, or knives could well also have been used by a guildsman for close combat after meeting a charge with the goedendag. On this account, the goedendag was sometimes confused with the halberd, morning star, or Lucerne hammer, a halberd with a hammer instead of an axe blade. In contrast with the goedendag, these were expressly built for professional warriors, to rip a rider off his horse while he was charging or passing by. Such weapons were much more effective but also more expensive, requiring greater craftsmanship to make. They were the weapons of regular infantrymen. This is why regular Flemish troops abandoned the goedendag at the beginning of the fifteenth century; after that point the weapon was used exclusively by the Flemish burghers.

== See also ==
- Pike pole
- Halberd
- Ahlspiess
- Plançon à picot
