= Lodewijk van Velthem =

Lodewijk van Velthem was a Flemish poet and priest of the late 13th and early 14th century writing in Middle Dutch.

== Biography ==
Very little is known about the life of Lodewijk van Velthem. He was said to be from Brabant, and from descriptions of what he witnessed we can deduce that he was active before 1293 and until at least 1327. He presumably lived in Paris between 1293 and 1296. In the winter of 1298, he was in Ghent. He was ordained a priest in or before 1304 as he worked as a chaplain in Zichem then. By 1312, he was the parish priest of Veltem, now a part of Herent; this is presumably the origin of his name. His earliest known writings date to this period, as the 4th part of the Spieghel Historiael was finished in 1315.

== Work ==
After the death of Jacob van Maerlant, Van Velthem finished his most important work, the Spieghel historiael, writing the end of the 4th part and the complete 5th part. In 1326, he finished the Boec van Merline, an Arthurian poem.

== Notes ==
- Besamusca, Bart (2009). De boeken van Velthem: auteur, oeuvre en overlevering. Verloren. ISBN 9789087040932.
