= Jacques de Châtillon =

Jacques de Châtillon or James of Châtillon (died 11 July 1302) was Lord of Leuze, of Condé, of Carency, of Huquoy and of Aubigny, the son of Guy III, Count of Saint-Pol and Matilda of Brabant. He married Catherine of Condé and had issue.

King Philip IV of France attempted to annex the County of Flanders by appointing Jacques as governor of the County in 1300. The Flemish Count Guy of Dampierre and his two sons had been imprisoned by the French.

After his appointment, Jacques de Châtillon entered Bruges. The imposition of heavy taxes, extortions by pro-French Flemish nobles and a visit by King Philip to Bruges on 29 May 1301, resulted in angering the local populace. A number of local movements erupted, such as in Bruges, where on 18 May 1302, the French garrison at Bruges was massacred. Jacques fled Bruges, but died less than two months later at the Battle of the Golden Spurs on 11 July 1302.

== Sources ==
- Aerts, Erik (1992). Bruges and Europe. Fonds Mercator.
- Bradbury, Jim (2007). The Capetians:Kings of France, 987-1328. Hambledon Continuum.
- Cohn, Samuel Kline Jr (2005). Popular Protest in Late-Medieval Europe: Italy, France and Flanders. Manchester University Press.
- Verbruggen, J. F. (2002). DeVries, Kelly (ed.). The Battle of the Golden Spurs (Courtrai, 11 July 1302): A Contribution to. The Boydell Press.
