= Pierre Flotte =

Pierre Flotte or Pierre Flote (Languedoc, second half of the 13th century – Kortrijk, 11 July 1302) was a French legalist, Chancellor of France and Keeper of the Seals of Philip IV the Fair. He was taught Roman law at the University of Montpellier, and was considered one of the best lawyers and legalists of his time. He led negotiations with the Roman Curia, England and Germany.

He was an adversary of Pope Boniface VIII, defending the authoritarianism of the French king against the Roman Church, and the first civilian to be appointed as Chancellor, as before, only ecclesiastics were granted this honor.

During his time as an envoy to Pope Boniface VIII Flotte, when asked by the Pope if Philip IV of France simply wanted to remove the Plantagenets from France whatever the excuse he replied “Sire, Vous dits vrai” or “Sir, You speak the truth.”

He died in the Battle of the Golden Spurs which took place near Kortrijk on 11 July 1302, when the local Flemish population mounted a successful uprising against France.
