= Sijsele =

Coordinates: 51°12′N 3°19′E

Sijsele is a village in the municipality of Damme, a part of the province of West Flanders, Belgium. It is also known as 'Sijsele-City' for the locals in and around Sijsele.

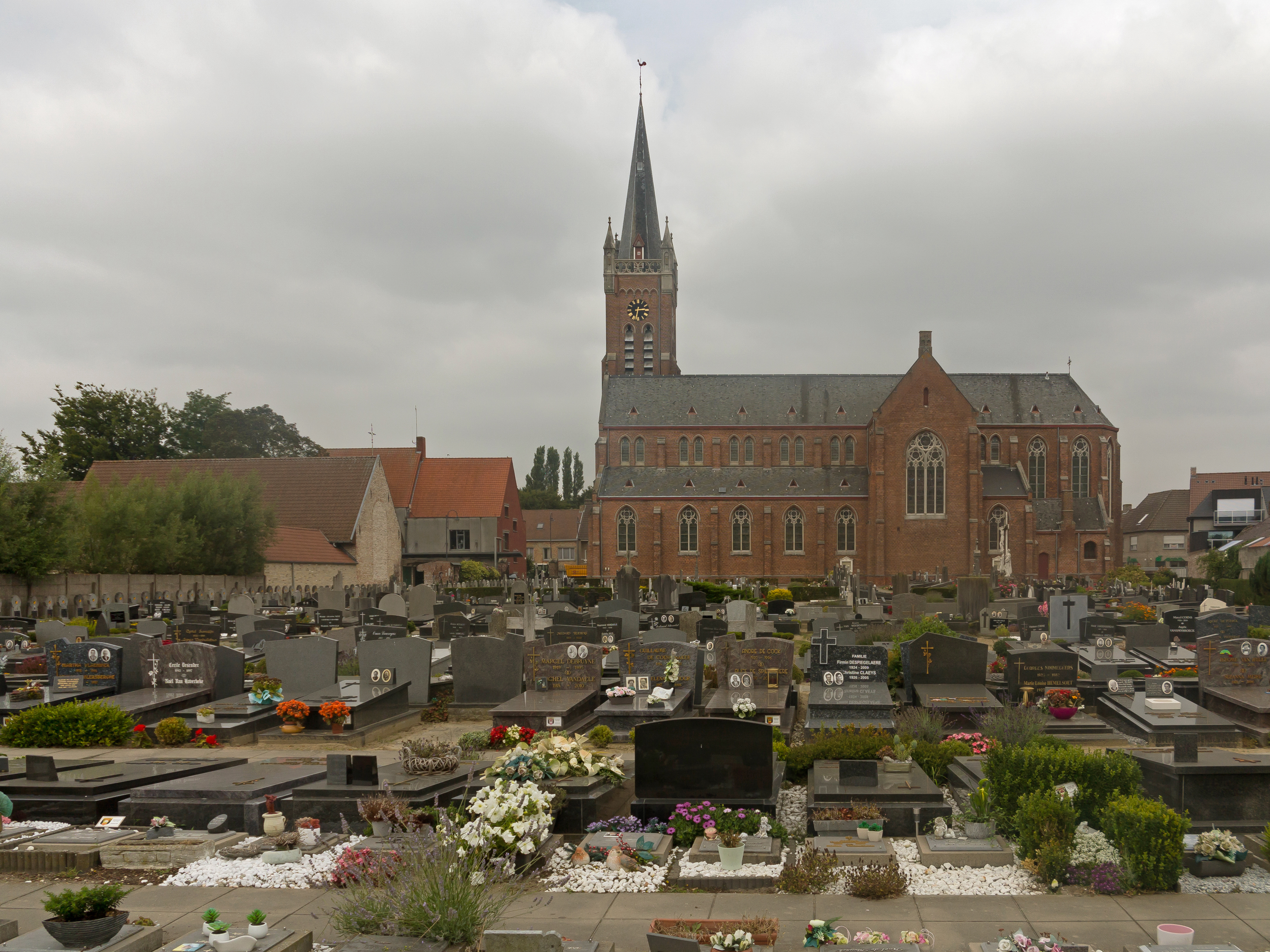
Church: the Sint Martinuskerk

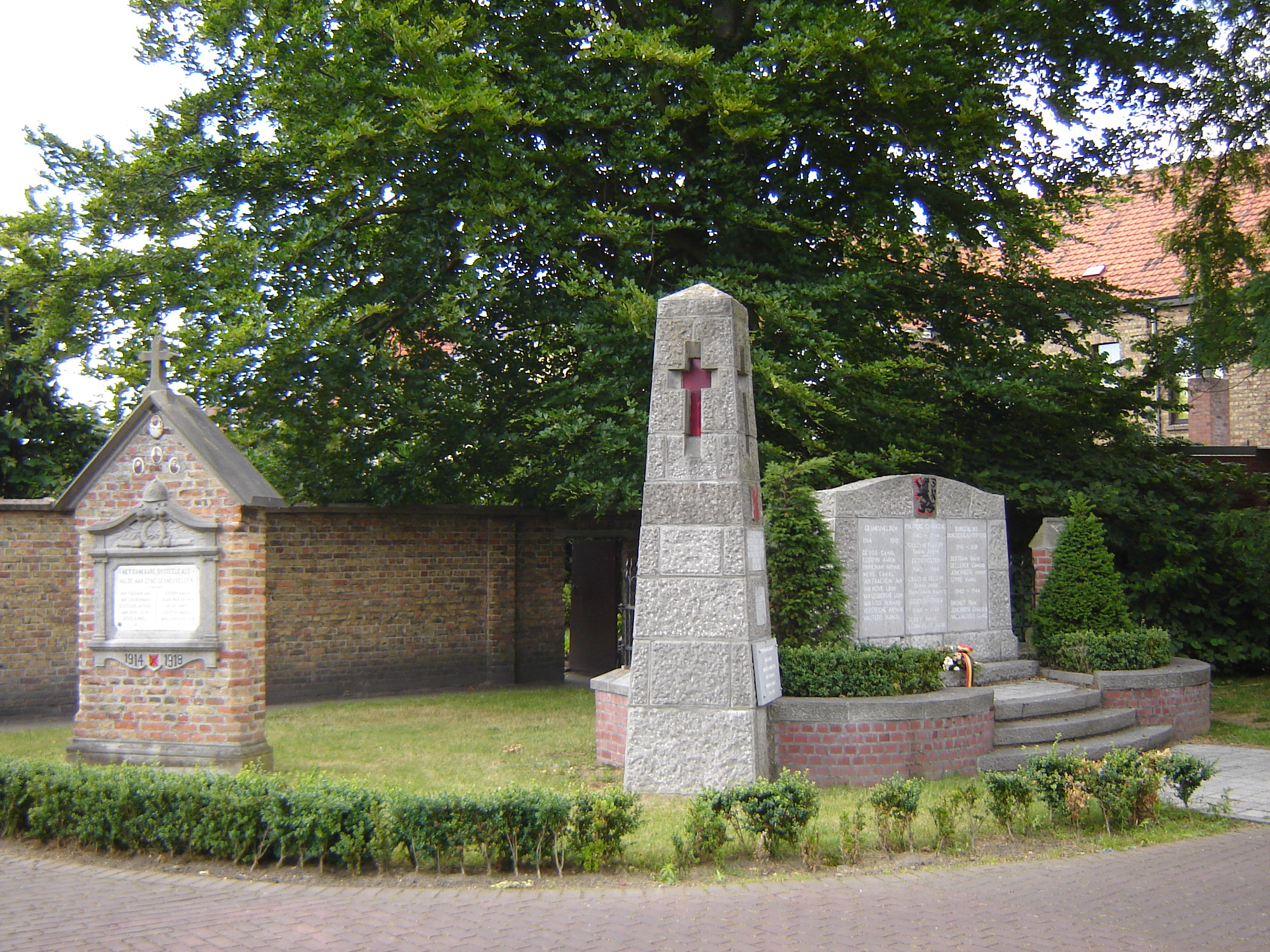
Sijsele World War I memorial
