= Guy of Namur =

Flemish noble

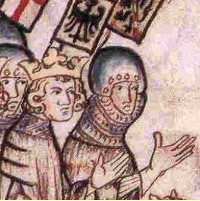

Guy of Dampierre, Count of Zeeland, also called Guy of Namur (Flemish: Gwijde van Namen) (ca. 1272 – 13 October 1311 in Pavia), was a Flemish noble who was the Lord of Ronse and later the self-proclaimed Count of Zeeland. He was a younger son of Guy, Count of Flanders and Isabelle of Luxembourg.

In 1302, with his father in prison and Flanders under French occupation, he was sent by his elder brother John I, Marquis of Namur, to take command of the rebellion there. He assembled the Flemish troops in Courtrai. He led the troops from western Flanders at the Battle of the Golden Spurs, and received great acclamation for the victory there. He took the title of Count of Zeeland and invaded Zeeland; but the French raised new armies, and he was beaten at the 1304 naval Battle of Zierikzee and became a captive of the William III, Count of Hainaut. Abandoning his designs on Zeeland, he went on campaign in Italy with his cousin Henry VII, Holy Roman Emperor. There he married Margaret, daughter of Theobald II, Duke of Lorraine. He died soon thereafter, without issue.

== Sources ==
- Bradbury, Jim (2007). The Capetians: Kings of France 987-1328. Hambledon Continuum.
- Fegley, Randall (2002). The Golden Spurs of Kortrijk: How the Knights of France Fell to the Foot Soldiers of Flanders in 1302. McFarland.
- Verbruggen, J. F. (1995). Devries, Kelly (ed.). The Battle of the Golden Spurs (Courtrai, 11 July 1302). Translated by Ferguson, David Richard. The Boydell Press.
- Verbruggen, J. F. (1997). The Art of Warfare in Western Europe During the Middle Ages: From the Eighth Century to 1340. Boydell & Brewer. ISBN 978-0-85115-570-8.
