= Karel Miry =

Belgian composer (1823–1889)

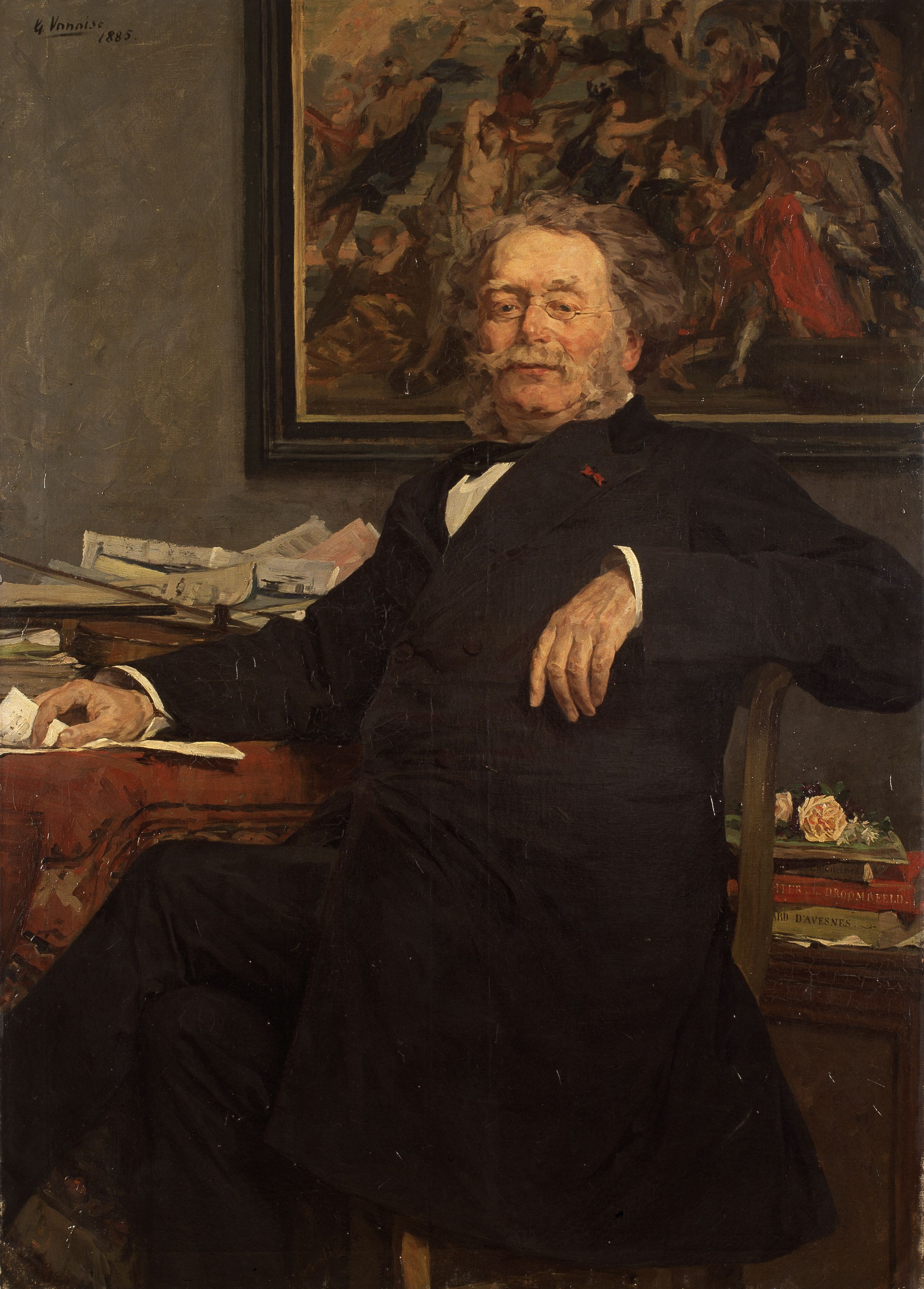
Karel Miry by Gustaaf Vanaise, 1885

Karel Miry (14 August 1823 – 5 October 1889) was a Belgian composer. He was one of the first Belgian composers to write operas to librettos in Dutch and is known as the composer of the music for De Vlaamse Leeuw, the national anthem of Flanders, for which Hippoliet van Peene wrote the lyrics.

Karel Miry was born and died in Ghent, where he studied the violin with Jean Andries and harmony and composition with Martin Joseph Mengal at the Royal Conservatory. He completed his studies at the Royal Conservatory of Brussels, where he was a student of François-Auguste Gevaert. Miry succeeded Andries as a professor of harmony and counterpoint in 1857, and in 1871 he became the assistant director under Adolphe Samuel of the conservatory. In 1875, he was appointed as inspector of music at the municipal schools of Ghent; in 1881 the state-aided schools were added to his responsibility. Karel Miry died in 1889 in Ghent.

Miry was well known for his operas, operettas, vaudevilles, and lyrical dramas. While he is one of the first composers to use Dutch language libretto’s, several French works were also written by him. He also composed romances, songs, and cantatas. His most famous work is De Vlaemsche Leeuw (The Lion of Flanders), which was very popular and became the official national anthem of the Flemish Community on 6 July 1973.

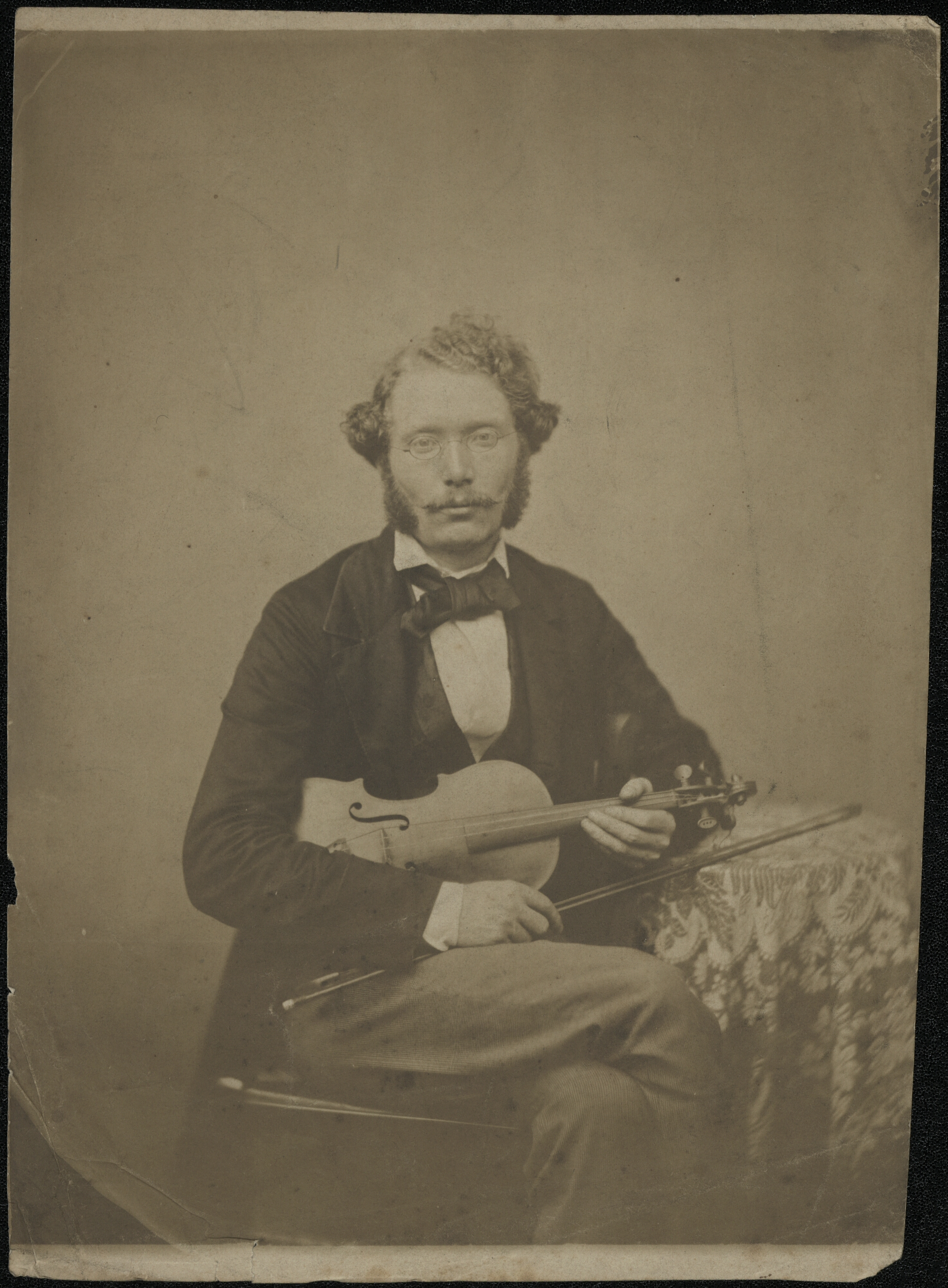
Miry with violin

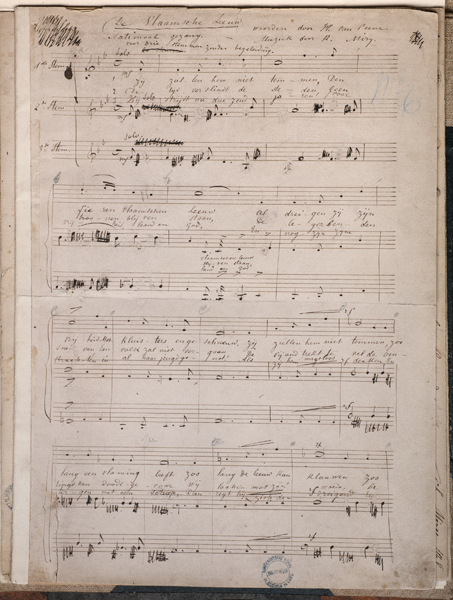
Sheet music of The Lion of Flanders

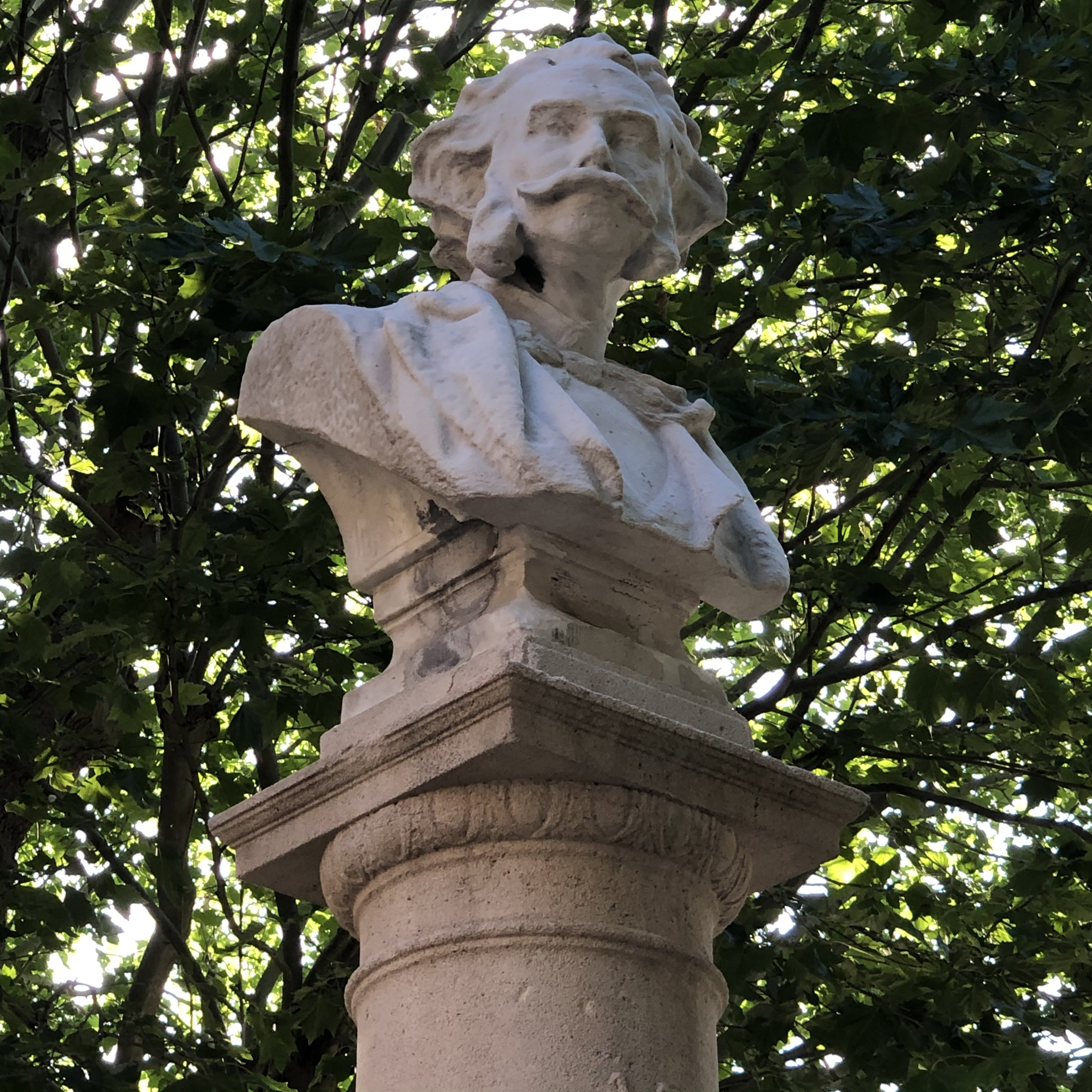
Buste in Gent

== Honours ==
- 1885: Officier in the Order of Leopold.

== Operas ==
- Wit en zwart (opera in 1 act, libretto by Hippoliet van Peene, premiered on 18 January 1846, in Ghent)
- Brigitta (opera in 3 acts, libretto by Hippoliet van Peene, premiered on 27 June 1847, in Ghent)
- Anne Mie (opera in 1 act, premiered on 9 October 1853, in Antwerp)
- La Lanterne magique (opera in 3 acts, libretto by Hippoliet van Peene, premiered on 10 March 1854, in Ghent)
- Karel V (opera in 5 acts, libretto by Hippoliet van Peene, premiered on 29 January 1857, in Ghent)
- Bouchard d'Avesnes (opera in 5 acts, libretto by Hippoliet van Peene, premiered on 6 March 1864, in Ghent)
- Maria van Boergondië (opera in 4 acts, libretto by N. Destanberg, premiered on 28 August 1866, in Ghent)
- De Keizer bij de Boeren (opera in 1 act, libretto by N. Destanberg, premiered on 29 October 1866, in Ghent)
- De occasie maakt den dief (opera in 1 act, libretto by N. Destanberg, premiered on 24 December 1866, in Ghent)
- Frans Ackermann (opera in 4 acts, libretto by N. Destanberg, premiered on 13 October 1867, in Brussels)
- Brutus en Cesar (opera in 1 act, libretto by P. Geiregat, premiered on 14 October 1867, in Ghent)
- Le Mariage de Marguerite (opera in 1 act, libretto by M. de Wille, premiered on 27 November 1867, in Ghent)
- Een engel op wacht (opera in 1 act, libretto by P. Geiregat, premiered on 8 December 1869, in Brussels)
- La Saint-Lucas (opera in 1 act, libretto by J. Story, premiered on 17 February 1870, in Ghent)
- Het Driekoningenfeest (opera in 1 act, libretto by P. Geiregat, premiered in 1870, in Brussels)
- De dichter en zijn droombeeld (opera in 4 acts, libretto by Hendrik Conscience, premiered on 2 December 1872, in Brussels)
- De twee zusters (opera in 1 act, libretto by P. Geiregat, premiered in 1872, in Brussels)
- Muziek in t'huisgezin (opera in 1 act, libretto by N. Destanberg, premiered in 1873)
- Het arme kind (opera in 1 act, libretto by J. Story, premiered in 1874, in Ghent)
- De kleine patriot (opera in 4 acts, libretto by J. Hoste, premiered on 23 December 1883, in Brussels)
- La Napolitaine (opera in 1 act, libretto by J. de Bruyne, premiered on 25 February 1888, in Antwerp)
