= Hogeschool Gent =

University college in Flanders, Belgium

Coordinates: 51°02′30″N 3°43′07″E

HOGENT University of Applied Sciences and Arts
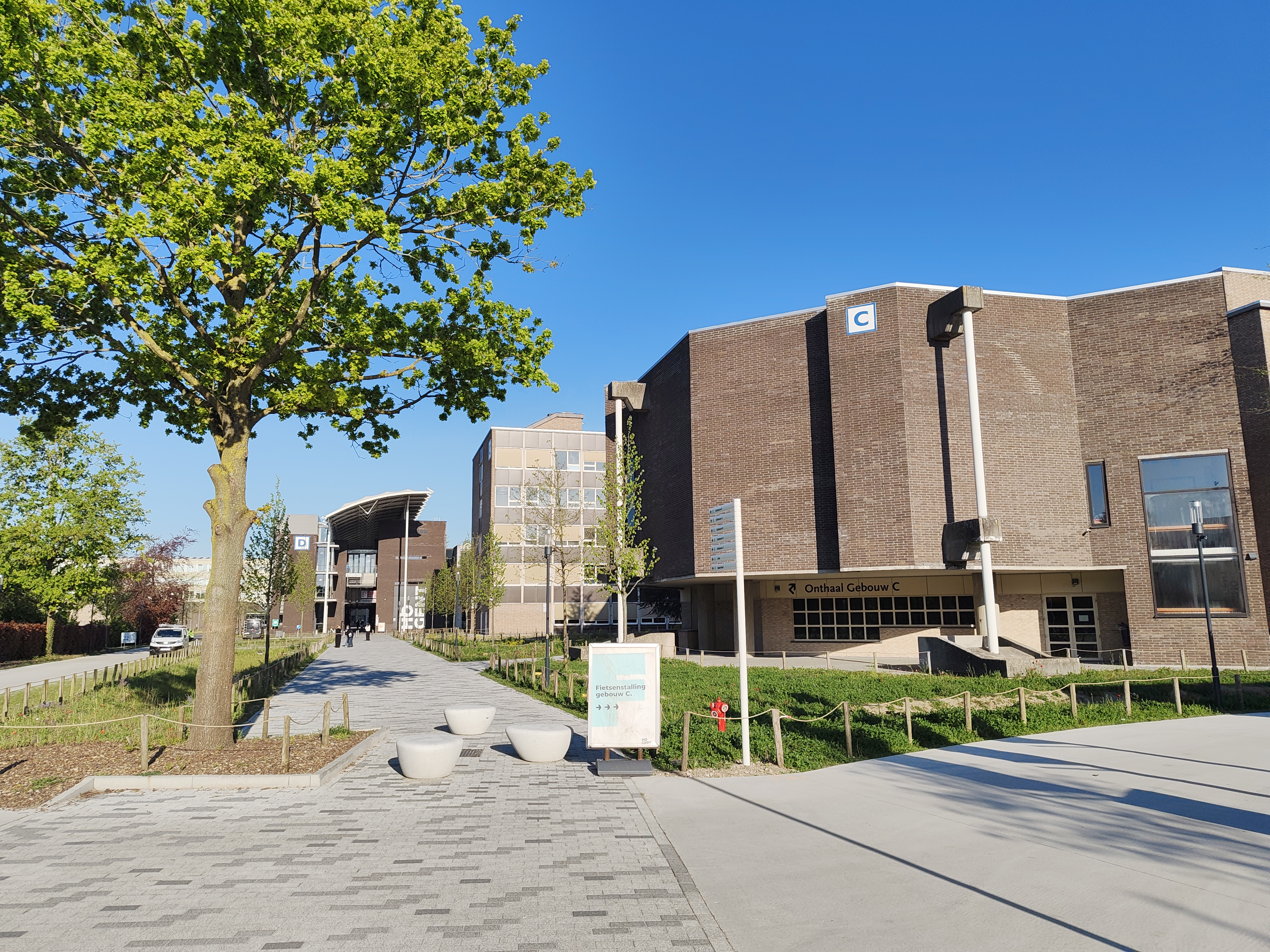
- Other names: University College Ghent, Hogeschool Gent
- Motto: Geef de wereld het beste van jezelf.
- Motto in English: Bring your best to the world
- Type: University of Applied Sciences and Arts
- Established: 1995
- Affiliations: Ghent University Association
- President: Paul Van Cauwenberge
- Principal: Koen Goethals
- Administrative staff: +/- 1,700 FTE
- Students: +/- 17,000
- Location: Ghent, Belgium
- Campus: Urban
- Nickname: HOGENT
- Website: www.hogent.be
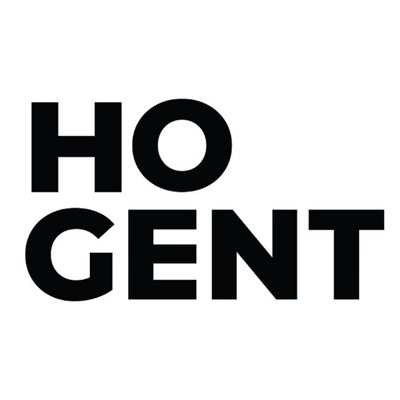

HOGENT University of Applied Sciences and Arts (University College Ghent, Dutch: Hogeschool Gent), often shortened to just HOGENT, is the largest university college in Flanders, with seven faculties, one School of Arts and over 17,000 students as of 2022. Its establishment in 1995 is the outcome of two successful mergers that involved sixteen Belgian institutions of higher education. Many had been influential leaders in higher education for several decades. The current faculties are spread over the city center of Ghent and Aalst.

== Organisation ==
University College Ghent is one of the 17 university colleges in Flanders. It was founded in 1995 when thirteen institutes of higher education merged. In 2001, a second merger took place to form University College Ghent as we know it today. In 2003, University College Ghent became part of the Ghent University Association, a cooperative body of universities and university colleges.

The governing bodies of University College Ghent are the Board of Governors, the President, the Executive Board, the Principal, the Deans and the Faculty Councils.

=== Faculties ===
University College Ghent consists of seven faculties and one School of Arts. Each of these entities is led by a dean, who is responsible for the day-to-day management of his or her faculty.

- Faculty of Business and Organization
- Faculty of Biosciences and Industrial Technology
- Faculty of Healthcare
- Faculty of IT and Digital Innovation
- Faculty of Teaching
- Faculty of Built Environment
- Faculty of Social Welfare work

=== Campus Locations ===
University College Ghent is a modern urban university college located throughout the city of Ghent. The main campus is Campus Schoonmeersen, which is home to most bachelors the University offers. There are also campuses in the neighbouring cities of Aalst and Melle.

=== Student facilities and services ===
Student facilities include libraries, concert halls, learning centres, research and study centres, a 3,000 m² sports centre and much more. Additionally, University College Ghent offers its students a complete range of student services, from housing and catering to student jobs, cultural events and medical assistance. All these services are centrally organized by the Office for Student Services and Student Life.

== Study programmes ==
University College Ghent offers a wide range of bachelor and master programmes in the following fields of study:

- Applied Engineering & Technology
- Applied Linguistics
- Architecture
- Audio-Visual & Visual Arts
- Biotechnology
- Business Administration
- Education
- Health Care
- Music & Performing Arts
- Social & Community Work

Some of the study programmes are taught exclusively in English. These programmes are specifically organized for foreign exchange students, but they are also open to Belgian students.

- Master of Audiovisual Arts
- Master of Fine Arts
- Master of Music
- Audiology
- Applied
- Information Technology
- Business, Retail and Languages
- Nursing
- Nutrition and Dietetics
- Occupational Therapy
- Social Educational Care Work
- Social Work
- Speech and Language Pathology

Furthermore, University College Ghent also offers a wide variety of follow-up programmes.

== Research and service provision ==
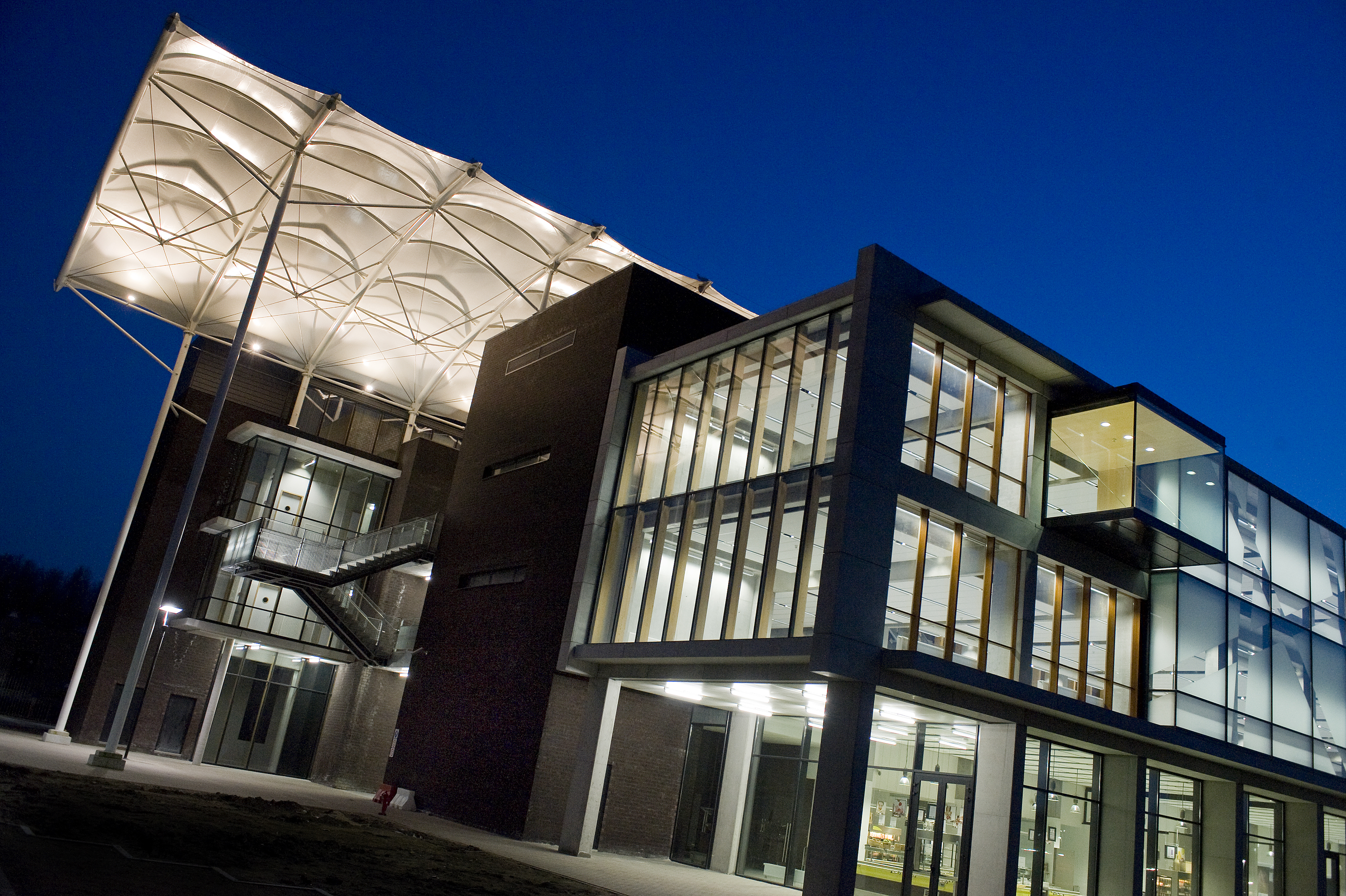
Campus Schoonmeersen

Nearly 414 researchers are actively involved in more than 110 research projects.

=== Funding ===
In 2008, University College Ghent’s research funds totalled €13 million, an increase of €2 million euros on the previous year.

== International ==
Each University College Ghent faculty has cooperation agreements with a number of partner institutions, amounting to 250 bilateral agreements with institutions from 26 European countries.

== Arts ==
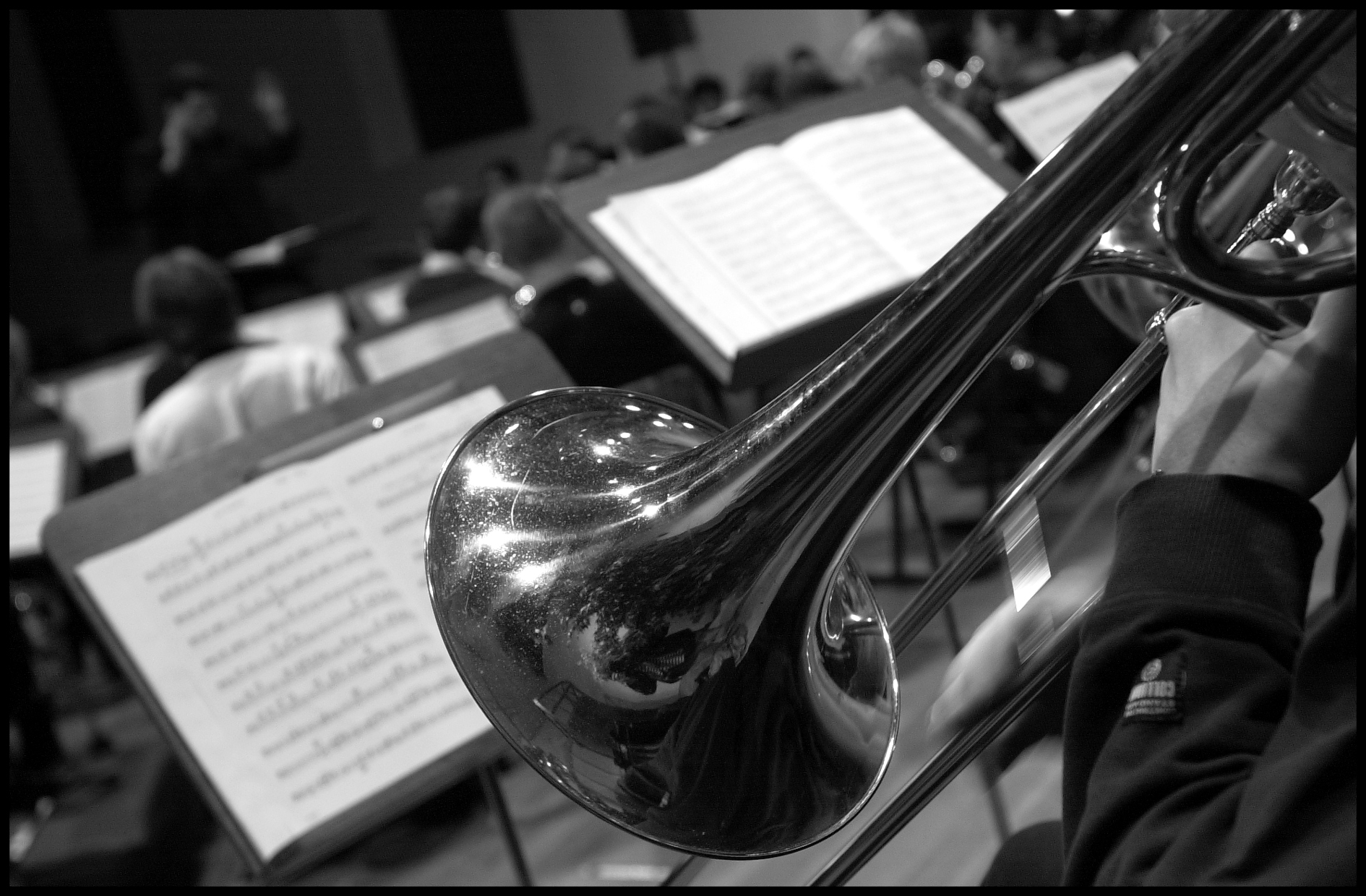

=== Art faculties ===
The School of Arts at University College Ghent encompasses the former Royal Academy of Fine Arts (Ghent), founded in 1741 and merged into the university in 1995, and the Royal Conservatory. Concerts and exhibitions are organized throughout the academic year.

=== The Royal Conservatory ===
The Royal Conservatory ("Koninklijk Conservatorium") was one of the sixteen cultural institution merged into the university in 1995, with a history and heritage in its own right. The founding director was Martin-Joseph Mengal, in 1835. Notable students and faculty at the conservatory have included François-Auguste Gevaert, who studied directly under Mengal in 1841, Paul-Henri-Joseph Lebrun, who studied here and became a professor, and Edouard Potjes, who served as professor of piano for 22 years.

=== A Prior ===
A Prior is an international magazine for contemporary art, published by the Faculty of Fine Arts.
