= De Leeuw van Vlaanderen =

De Leeuw van Vlaanderen or Leeuw van Vlaanderen may refer to:

- The Flag of Flanders
- De Vlaamse Leeuw, the Flemish regional anthem
- Robert III, Count of Flanders (1249–1322)
- De Leeuw van Vlaanderen (novel) (1838), by Hendrik Conscience
- De Leeuw van Vlaanderen (film) (1985), based on the novel, written and directed by Hugo Claus
