= Julien Paul Blitz =

American cellist, conductor, and teacher (1885–1951)

Julien Paul Blitz (May 21, 1885 – July 17, 1951) was an American cellist, conductor, and teacher. He was the first music director of the Houston Symphony.

== Biography ==
Blitz was born in Ghent, Belgium, the son of violinist and martinist Edouard E. Blitz (1860–1915) and pianist Mattie Louise Miller (1865–1904). He moved to the United States with his family at the age of two. He began violin studies with his father, who had been appointed the first music director of the Kansas City Philharmonic. He commenced musical studies in 1901 at the Ghent Conservatory, where he studied with Paul-Henri-Joseph Lebrun, Joseph Lampens, Joseph Jacobs, Leon Rinskoph, and Edouard Jacobs. Blitz made his debut in 1904 and graduated cum laude from the conservatory in 1905.

=== Career ===
Blitz was engaged as a cellist in the Kursaal Orchestra in Ostend, Belgium, then returned to the United States. He lived in New York City briefly, then accepted a position at Baylor College in Belton, Texas.

In 1913, Blitz founded and became the first music director of the Houston Symphony; he also directed activities of the Houston Treble Clef Club. Blitz's tenure in Houston lasted until 1916. From 1917 to 1922, he conducted the San Antonio Symphony. In San Antonio Blitz was also the director of the Chaminade Choral Society of the Tuesday Musical Club. Subsequent positions held by Blitz include faculty positions at the San Antonio College of Music; Austin College and Kidd-Key College (where he was head of the string department), both in Sherman, Texas; the Fort Worth Conservatory, and, from 1934 until 1950, head of the music department at Texas Technological College (later Texas Tech University) in Lubbock.

Blitz moved to Dallas in 1950, where he taught and coached music in the public schools and performed as a guest cellist with the Dallas Symphony Orchestra.

=== Personal life ===
Blitz was married to pianist Flora Briggs on January 24, 1921, and died in Dallas on July 17, 1951. The Blitzes had one child, Edouard Marquis Blitz, who became the assistant principal cellist of the Dallas Symphony.
