= Émile Mathieu =

Émile Mathieu may refer to:

- Émile Léonard Mathieu (1835–1890), French mathematician
- Émile Mathieu (composer) (1844–1932), Belgian composer
- Émile Mathieu (aviator), pioneer Belgian aviator
