= Koninklijk Conservatorium =

Het Koninklijk Conservatorium means "The Royal Conservatory" in Dutch. The title may refer to:

- Royal Conservatory of The Hague
- Koninklijk Conservatorium (Brussels)
- Koninklijk Conservatorium (Ghent)
