= Jane Vignery =

Belgian composer and music educator

- Born: Jeanne Emilie Virginie Vignery; 11 April 1913; Ghent, Belgium
- Died: 15 August 1974 (aged 61)
- Occupations: Composer, teacher, violinist
- Notable work: Sonata for Horn and Piano, Op. 7

Jeanne Emilie Virginie Vignery (11 April 1913 – 15 August 1974) was a Belgian composer, teacher, and violinist who published her compositions under the name "Jane Vignery." She is best remembered today for her Sonata for Horn and Piano, opus 7.

== Life and career ==
Vignery was born in Ghent. Her father was an engineer. Her mother (Palmyre Buyst) and grandfather composed music and gave Vignery her first music lessons. Vignery went on to study at the Royal Conservatory of Ghent, the Ecole Normale de Musique in Paris, and with Nadia Boulanger, Jacques de la Presle, and Paul Dukas.

Vignery was nominated for the Prix de Rome in 1941. In 1942, the Royal Belgian Academy awarded her the Prix Emile Mathieu for her Sonata for Horn and Piano. In 1943, she won the Prix Irene Fuerison.

A muscle disease forced Vignery to give up playing the violin and concentrate on composition. She began teaching at the Royal Conservatory of Ghent in 1945, where she remained until her death in a train accident in 1974.

Vignery's music was published by Brogneaux. Her compositions included:

== Chamber ==
- Sonata for Horn and Piano, opus 7
- Sonata for Violin, opus 8

== Orchestra ==
- La Fille de Jephte (solo voice and orchestra)
- Vision de Guerre

== Vocal ==
- "J'ai peur d'un baiser" (text by Paul Verlaine)
