= The Lion of Flanders (novel) =

1838 historical novel by Hendrik Conscience

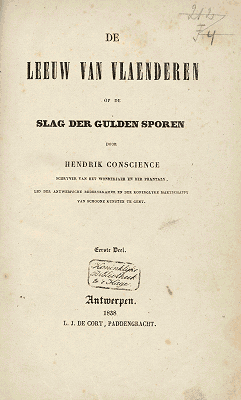
- Title page for the first edition.
- Author: Hendrik Conscience
- Original title: De Leeuw van Vlaenderen, of de Slag der Gulden Sporen
- Language: Dutch
- Subject: War, Romance
- Genre: Historical fiction
- Publisher: L.J. de Cort (Antwerp)
- Publication date: 1838
- Publication place: Belgium
- English publication date: 1855
- Dewey Decimal: 839.3

The Lion of Flanders, or the Battle of the Golden Spurs (Dutch: De Leeuw van Vlaenderen, of de Slag der Gulden Sporen) is a major novel first published in 1838 by the Belgian writer Hendrik Conscience (1812–1883)—an early example of historical fiction. The book focuses on the medieval Franco-Flemish War and the Battle of the Golden Spurs of 1302 in particular. It is written in Conscience's typical stylistic romanticism and has been described as the "Flemish national epic".

It was unusual for The Lion of Flanders to be written in Dutch. Considered as one of the founding texts of Flemish literature, it became a significant work for the emerging Flemish Movement, reviving popular interest in the Battle of the Golden Spurs and Flemish medieval history as part of a modern political agenda. Despite its importance, the work has become little-read in modern times. Nonetheless, it has been the subject of various adaptations in the form of cartoons, television series, and film.

== Background ==
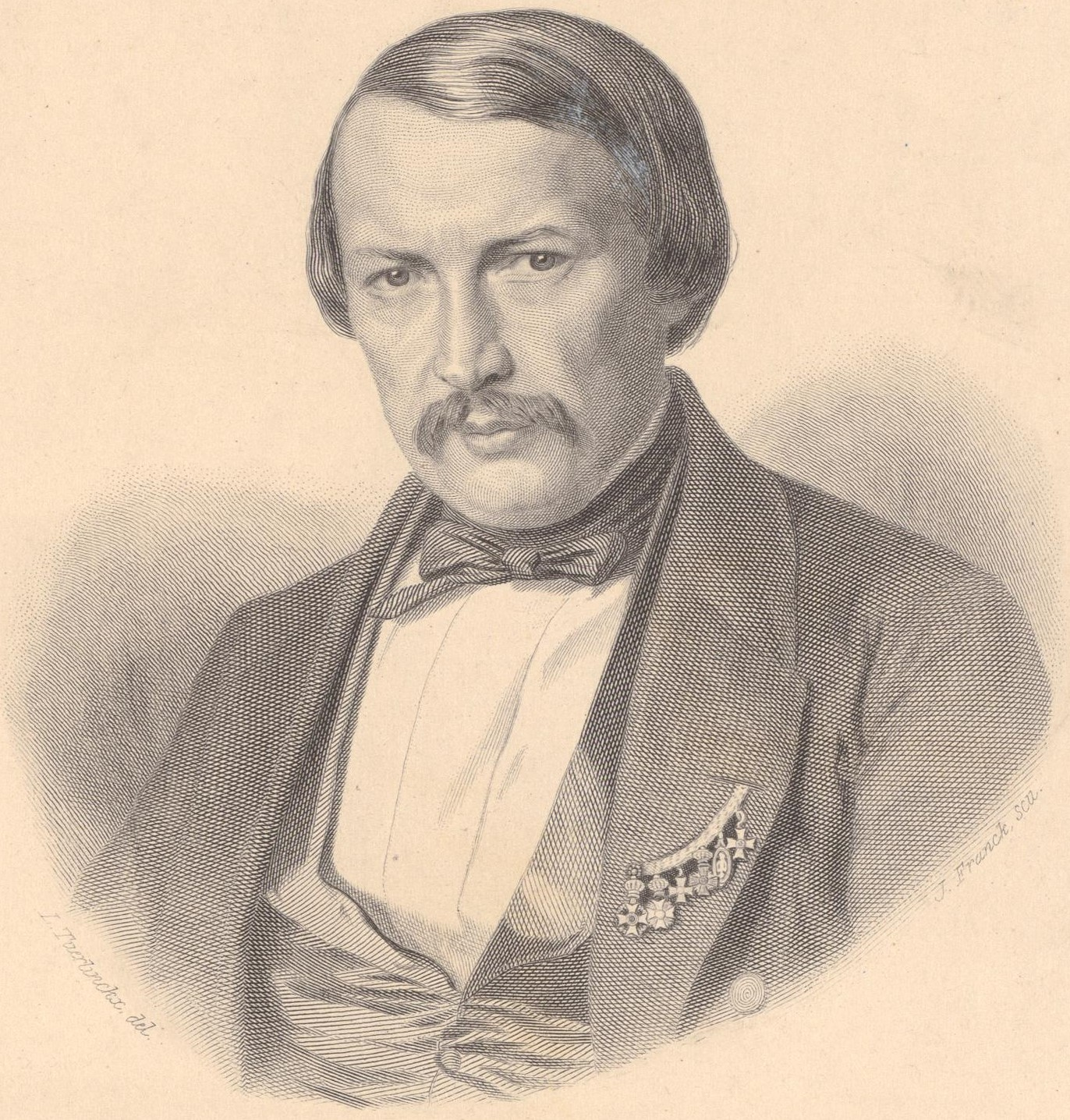
Portrait of Hendrik Conscience as a young man

Hendrik Conscience was born into a mixed French-Flemish family in 1812 at Antwerp which was under the French rule. He was brought up bilingual, speaking both French and Dutch. After briefly working as a teacher, he participated in the Belgian Revolution in 1830 and was inspired by the contemporary ideology of romantic nationalism. He served in the Belgian Army during the Ten Days' Campaign in 1831. He was demobilised in 1836 and moved to the impoverished Kempen region near the Dutch border where he began to pursue a literary career.

Conscience worked in the new genre of historical fiction which had begun to emerge elsewhere in Europe in around 1800. His early writing combined his interests in the history of Flanders with literary romanticism. His first book, In 't Wonderjaer (In the Year of Wonder) was published in 1837 and explored both themes. It was the first example of historical fiction published in Dutch and was set during the Beeldenstorm of 1566 about the revolt by Calvinists of the Spanish Netherlands against Catholic rule. Conscience was only able to publish the work with the financial support of friends and patrons including King Leopold I. Though relatively successful, the work made him little money and Conscience began to work on a new book.

The innovative dimension of Conscience's work was his use of Dutch language in his writing. At the time, Belgian and Western European high culture was dominated by French which was also the established language of the upper classes and state bureaucracy across the country. Though Dutch dialects were commonly spoken in Flanders as a vernacular, their use was considered vulgar by the bourgeoisie and inappropriate in literature. Conscience, however, believed that Dutch provided a more authentic form of expression and preferred to use it, making his works unusual at the time.

== Novel ==
=== Content and publication ===
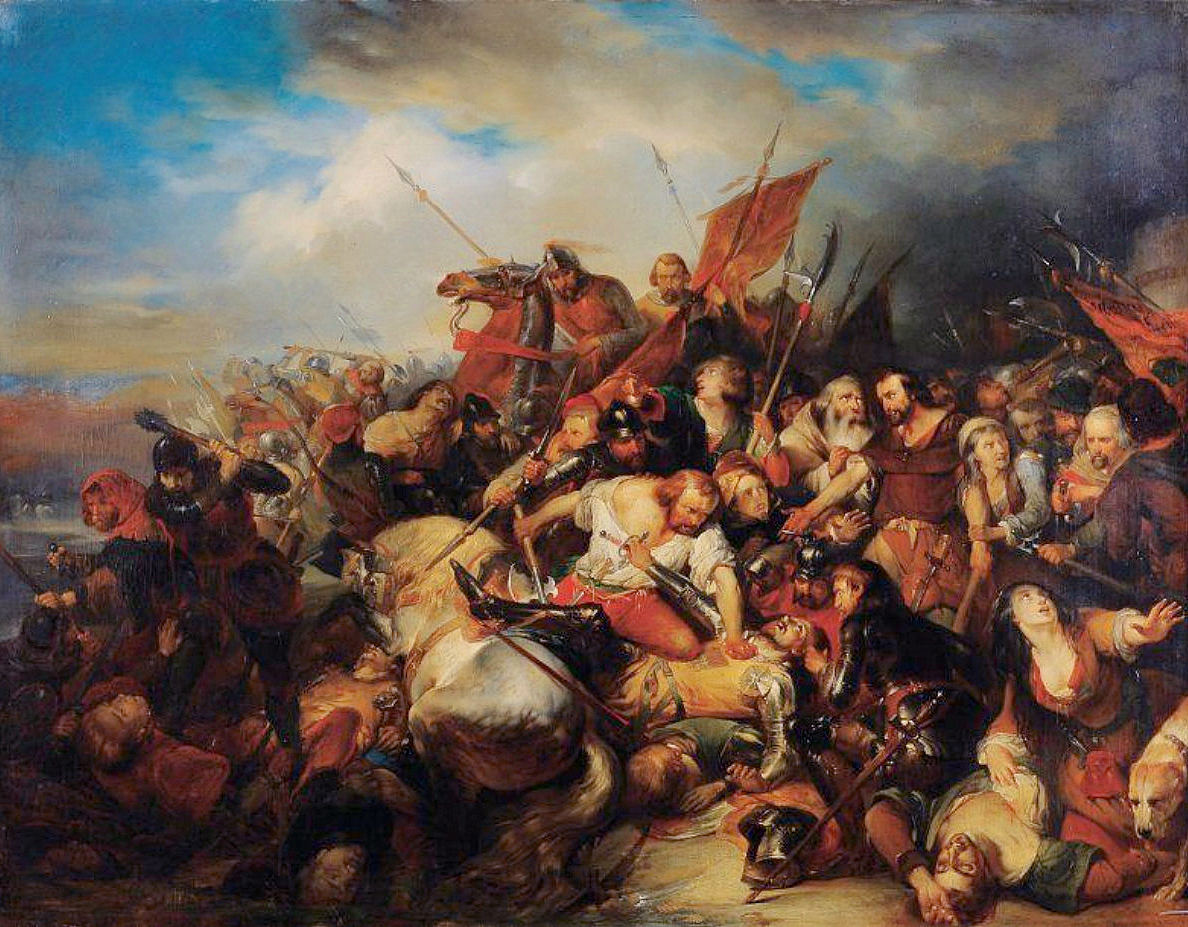
De Slag der Gulden Sporen (1836) by Nicaise de Keyser may have served as an inspiration for the book

In 1838, Conscience published his second book, entitled De Leeuw van Vlaenderen, of de Slag der Gulden Sporen (Note: The "ae" combination from Vlaenderen (Flanders) is considered archaic in modern Dutch and is replaced by Vlaanderen in modern editions.) (The Lion of Flanders, or the Battle of the Golden Spurs). The book was set in Medieval Flanders and focused on the Franco-Flemish War (1297–1305). Its main theme was the Battle of Kortrik of 1302, commonly known as the Battle of the Golden Spurs (Guldensporenslag), in which a small Flemish force, made up of local militia, unexpectedly defeated a superior invading force from the Kingdom of France. It was believed that Conscience may have been inspired by a romantic painting of the battle by the Flemish artist Nicaise de Keyser, unveiled in 1836.

Conscience's work approaches the subject through the romance between Machteld, daughter of Robert III, Count of Flanders (the eponymous "Lion of Flanders"), and the knight Adolf van Nieuwlandt. The book famously concluded with a direct injunction to the reader:

Gy Vlaming, die dit boek gelezen hebt, overweeg, by de roemryke daden welke hetzelve bevat, wat Vlaenderen eertyds was – wat het nu is – en nog meer wat het worden zal indien gy de heilige voorbeelden uwer Vaderen vergeet!

Translation:

You Fleming who has read this book, reflect, through the glorious deeds that it recounts, what Flanders once was, what it is now, and even more what it shall become if you forget the sacred examples of your forefathers!

In his foreword to the 1838 edition, Conscience explicitly stated that he intended his book to raise Flemish national consciousness and patriotism. He researched the historical events by reading contemporary chronicles and his narrative frequently diverged from historical fact, contributed to the mythology of events as clash between the Flemish and French-speaking invaders.

=== Reception and influence ===
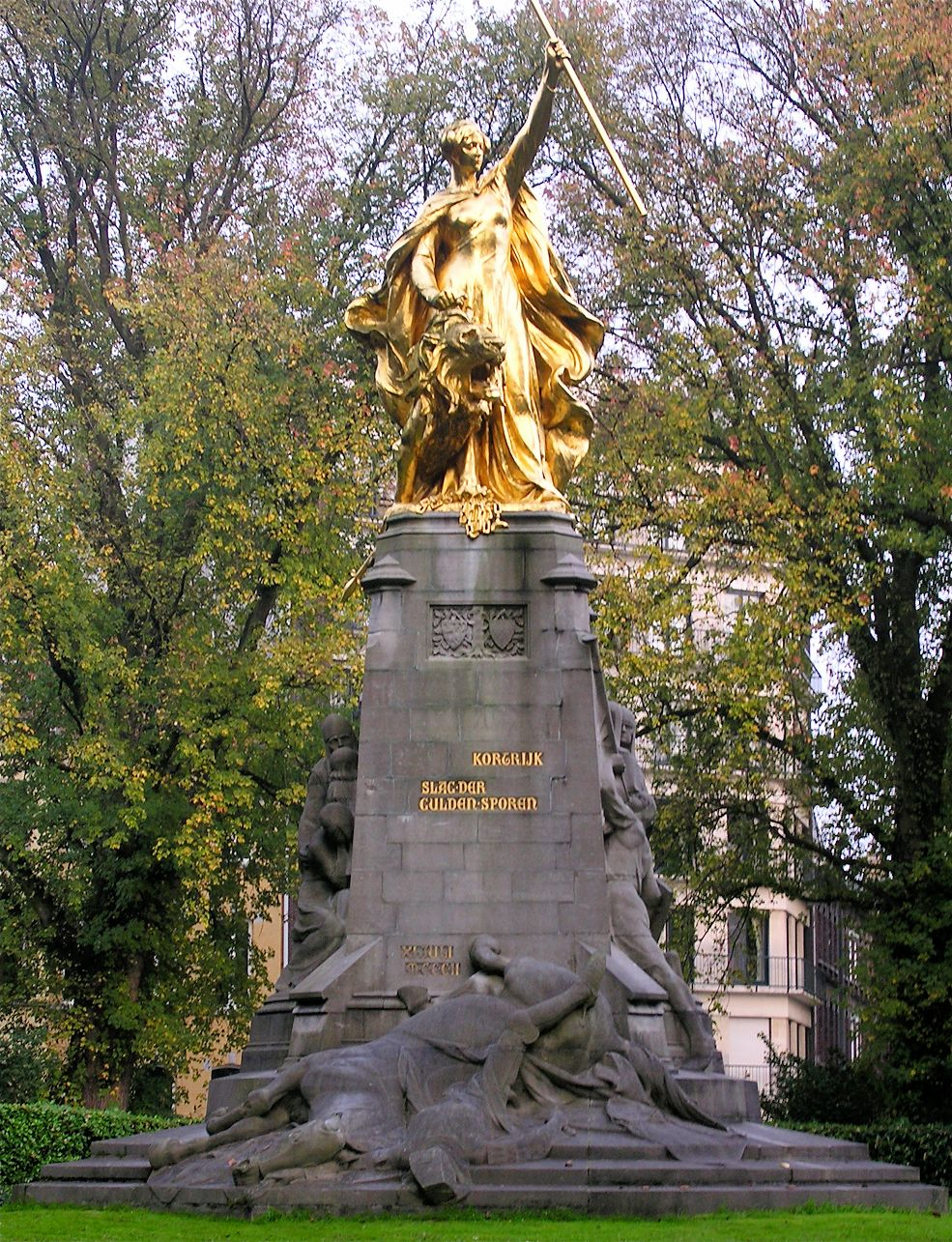
The Groeninge Monument (1906) in Kortrijk commemorates the Battle of the Golden Spurs, popularised by Conscience

The Encyclopædia Britannica describes De Leeuw as a "passionate epic" and compares it to the historical fiction of the Scottish writer Sir Walter Scott (1771–1832). The work's public success confirmed Conscience's reputation as the leading Flemish novelist of his generation. By the time of his death in 1883, he had written around 100 novels and novellas. With the immense success of the De Leeuw van Vlaanderen, Conscience was widely credited as the man who "taught his people to read" (leerde zijn volk lezen) in popular culture in Flanders.

The publication of The Lion coincided with the emergence of the Flemish Movement which supported an increasingly assertive Flemish identity, initially cultural in nature and later increasingly political. Conscience himself believed that Flemish and Belgian patriotisms were complementary. He was a Belgian nationalist. However, as a celebration of Dutch language and Flemish history the Lion became popular among flamingants. This contributed to the increasing importance of the Battle of the Golden Spurs in Flemish political memory. The battle had been largely forgotten before Conscience's work but was revived through popular culture and local identity. Among other things, it inspired the flag of Flanders and the anthem "De Vlaamse Leeuw" (1847) by Hippoliet Van Peene. Today an annual public holiday is held on the battle's anniversary. It has been noted, however, that the increased status of the work in Flemish nationalist consciousness also coincided with a decreasing readership of the book itself.

== Adaptations ==
The Lion of Flanders has been the subject of various adaptations. At least nine comic strip adaptations have been produced following the book’s story. The most celebrated was by Bob De Moor which was serialised in Tintin after 1949. It was also published as a single volume in 1952 and acclaimed as one of his best works. Also notable is Karel Biddeloo's loose adaptation of the work in 1984 within the De Rode Ridder series, inspired by surrealism.

The work was also adapted into a film in 1984, directed by the celebrated Flemish writer Hugo Claus, to commemorate the centenary of Conscience's death. The film was itself adapted into a television series by Claus in 1985. The work was a co-production between various private and state groups in Belgium and the Netherlands and, at 80 million Belgian francs, was the most expensive film produced in the Low Countries to date. As director, Claus attempted to stick as closely to the original text as possible. The film was a commercial and critical disaster, criticised for excessive romanticism and a Flemish-nationalist political agenda.

== Notes and references ==
=== Bibliography ===
- "Hendrik Conscience". Britannica.com. Encyclopædia Britannica (online).
- "Hendrik Conscience". Literatuurgeschiedenis.org. Literatuurgeschiedenis.
- Hermans, Theo (2014). "The Highs and Lows of Hendrik Conscience". The Low Countries: Arts and Society in Flanders and the Netherlands. 22: 162–9.
- Hermann, Christine (2016). "A conflict in words and images, or a conflict between word and image? An intermedial analysis of graphic novel adaptations of Hendrik Conscience's The Lion of Flanders (1838)". In Fenoulhet, Jane; Quist, Gerdi; Tiedau, Ulrich (eds.). Discord and Consensus in the Low Countries, 1700–2000. Vol. 1. London: UCL Press. pp. 57–80. doi:10.2307/j.ctt1g69z77.8. ISBN 9781910634301. JSTOR j.ctt1g69z77.8.
- "De Leeuw van Vlaenderen of de Slag der Gulden Sporen". Literatuurgeschiedenis.org. Literatuurgeschiedenis.
- Willems, Gertjan (2014). "Conscience's De Leeuw van Vlaanderen (The Lion of Flanders) and Its Adaptation to Film by Claus". CLCWeb: Comparative Literature and Culture. 16 (3). doi:10.7771/1481-4374.2318.
