= Royal Conservatory of Ghent =

Music college in Ghent, Belgium

- Koninklijk Conservatorium Gent (Dutch)
- Biezekapelstraat 9, Ghent; Belgium

Information
- Type: Music conservatory
- Established: 1835
- Language: Dutch, English
- Website: https://schoolofartsgent.be/en/

The Royal Conservatory of Ghent (Dutch: Koninklijk Conservatorium Gent) is a historic conservatory and a royally chartered musical institution in Ghent, Belgium. It is now a part of the University College Ghent.

== History ==
The Royal Conservatory of Ghent is a royally chartered musical institution, founded in 1835 under King Leopold I. The conservatory's founding director was Martin-Joseph Mengal. Other directors have included well-known Belgian composers such as Adolphe Samuel and Émile Mathieu. The current dean is Filip Rathé.

The Royal Conservatory is one of four conservatories in Flanders and eight in Belgium. In addition to classical instrumental and vocal studies, it offers degrees in jazz, pop, music production, composition and instrument building. It offers bachelor's and master's degrees (including an English master's degree in music), and an Advanced Master of Contemporary Music. The school also offers post-graduate degrees in music as well as a European Postgraduate in Arts in Sound.

The school traditionally attaches great importance to the practice of chamber music. Since 2006, the school has mounted an annual opera production. It also has two main performance venues, the Miry Concert Hall and Club Telex.

In 1995, the Royal Conservatory was one of sixteen Belgian institutions merged into the University College Ghent. It provides training for about 480 students, with master's programs for drama and music. Since 2011, together with the Royal Academy of Fine Arts (KASK), it forms part of the School of Arts of the University College Ghent.

== Notable alumni ==
Notable students and faculty at the conservatory have included François-Auguste Gevaert, who studied directly under Mengal in 1841, Paul-Henri-Joseph Lebrun, who studied here and became a professor, and Edouard Potjes, who served as professor of piano for 22 years. Other famous alumni include:

- Julien Paul Blitz
- Dirk Brossé
- Jean-Baptiste Dubois
- Lucien Goethals
- Walter Hus
- Karel Miry
- Karel Paukert
- Annelies Van Parys
- Jane Vignery

== Directors ==
- Martin-Joseph Mengal 1835–1851
- Jean Andries 1798–1872
- Adolphe Samuel 1871–1898
- Emile Mathieu 1898–1924
- Martin Lunssens 1924–1936
- Jules-Toussaint de Sutter 1936–1954
- Léon Torck 1954–1968
- Gabriël Verschraegen 1968–1981
- Johan Huys 1981–1997
- Jan Rispens 1997–2009
- Maarten Weyler 2009–2011

== Assistant Directors ==
- Karel Miry 1871–1889

== Supervisors ==
- Victor Van den Hecke de Lembeke 1855–1870
- Gustave Louis Marie De Burbure De Wesembeek 1870–1871

== Deans of the School of Arts, University College Ghent ==
- Wim de Temmerman 2011–2019
- Lars Kwakkenbos 2019–2020
- Filip Rathé 2021–present
