= Hippoliet Van Peene =

Flemish poet and playwright

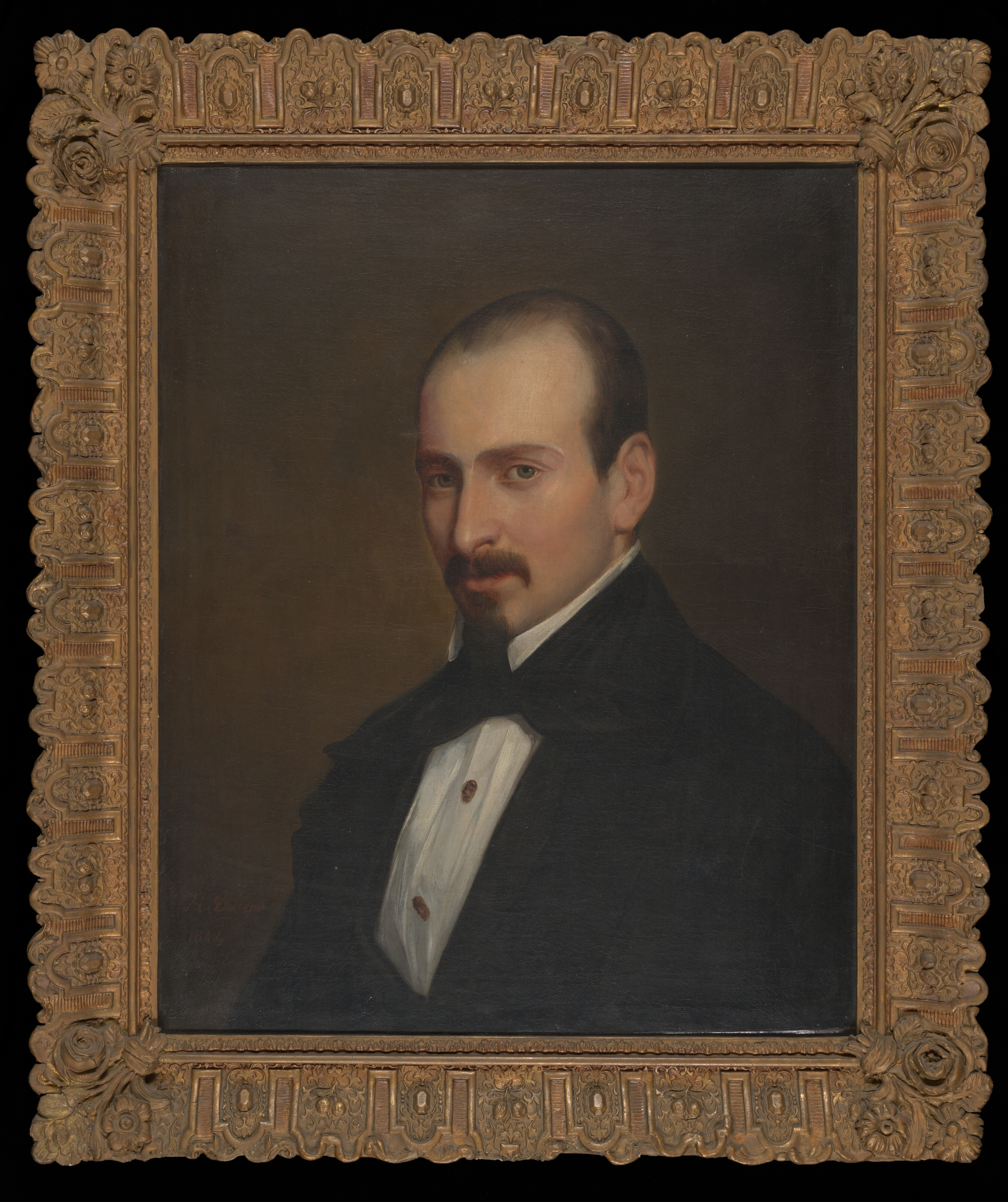
Hippoliet Van Peene

Hippoliet Jan Van Peene (1 January 1811 in Kaprijke – 19 February 1864 in Ghent) was a Belgian medical doctor and playwright.

He studied medicine at the State University of Leuven and became a physician in Kaprijke and later in Ghent.

In 1847 he wrote the lyrics of the Flemish anthem "De Vlaamse Leeuw" of which the music was composed by Karel Miry. He was the first modern Flemish playwright and he wrote 35 theatre plays, which in his time were performed by Broedermin en Taelyver in Ghent. At the inauguration of the Minard Theatre in 1847, his Brigitta of de Twee Vondelingen was performed.

== Bibliography ==
- Keizer Karel en de Berchemsche Boer, comedy, 1841
- Jacob van Artevelde, historical drama, 1841
- Willem van Dampierre, historical drama, 1847
- Het Belfort of de Koop van Vlaanderen
- Jan de Vierde, historical drama, 1841 (400th anniversary of the Fonteinisten)
- Brigitta of de Twee Vondelingen, 1847

== Sources ==
- Hippoliet Van Peene
- Verschaffel, H. 1998. Hippoliet Van Peene, Nieuwe encyclopedie van de Vlaamse Beweging (G–Q). Tielt: uitgeverij Lannoo, pp. 2406–2407.
- "De Vlaemsche leeuw". lib.ugent.be.

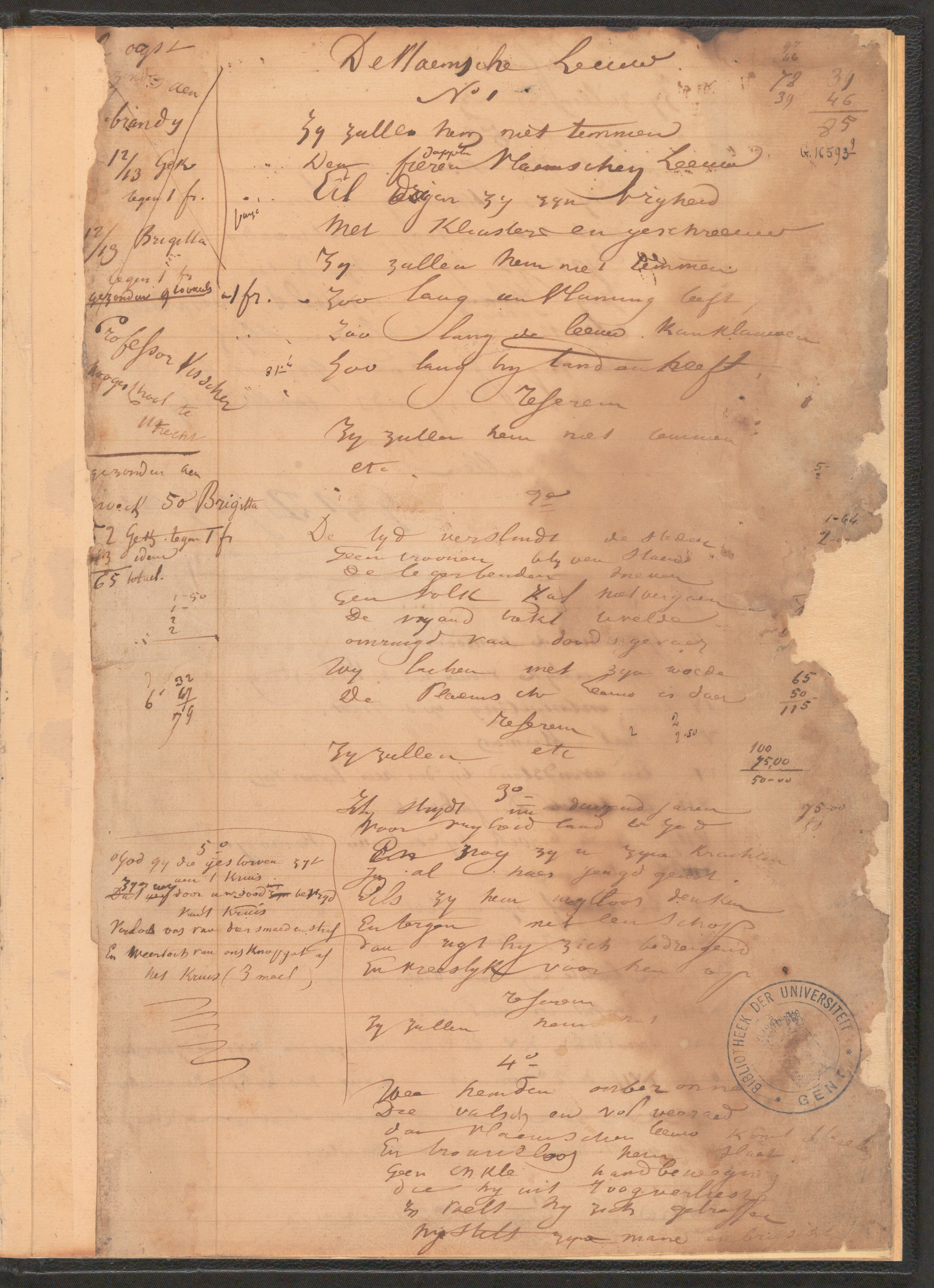
The Flemish national anthem, De Vlaemsche leeuw. Written by Hippoliet Van Peene. Published on 22 July 1845. Original manuscript.
