= De Vlaamse Leeuw =

Regional anthem of Flanders, Belgium

English: The Flemish Lion
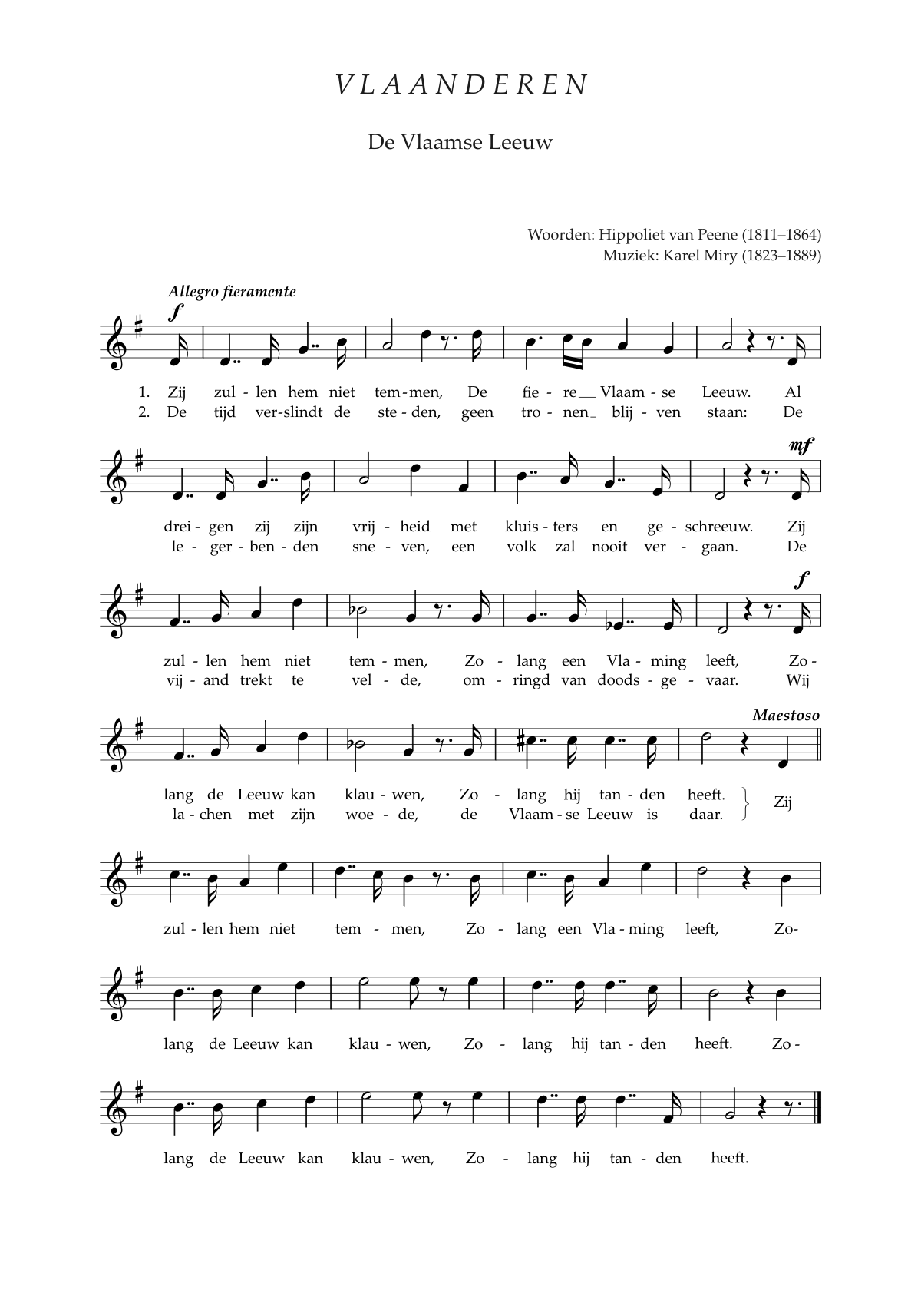
- "De Vlaamse Leeuw"
- Regional anthem of Flanders
- Lyrics: Hippoliet Van Peene, 1847
- Music: Karel Miry
- Adopted: 1973

Audio sample
- Orchestral instrumental rendition in G major: file; help

"De Vlaamse Leeuw" (Dutch: [də ˈvlaːmsə ˈleːu]; The Flemish Lion) is the official anthem of Flanders, a region and community in Belgium.

== Composition ==
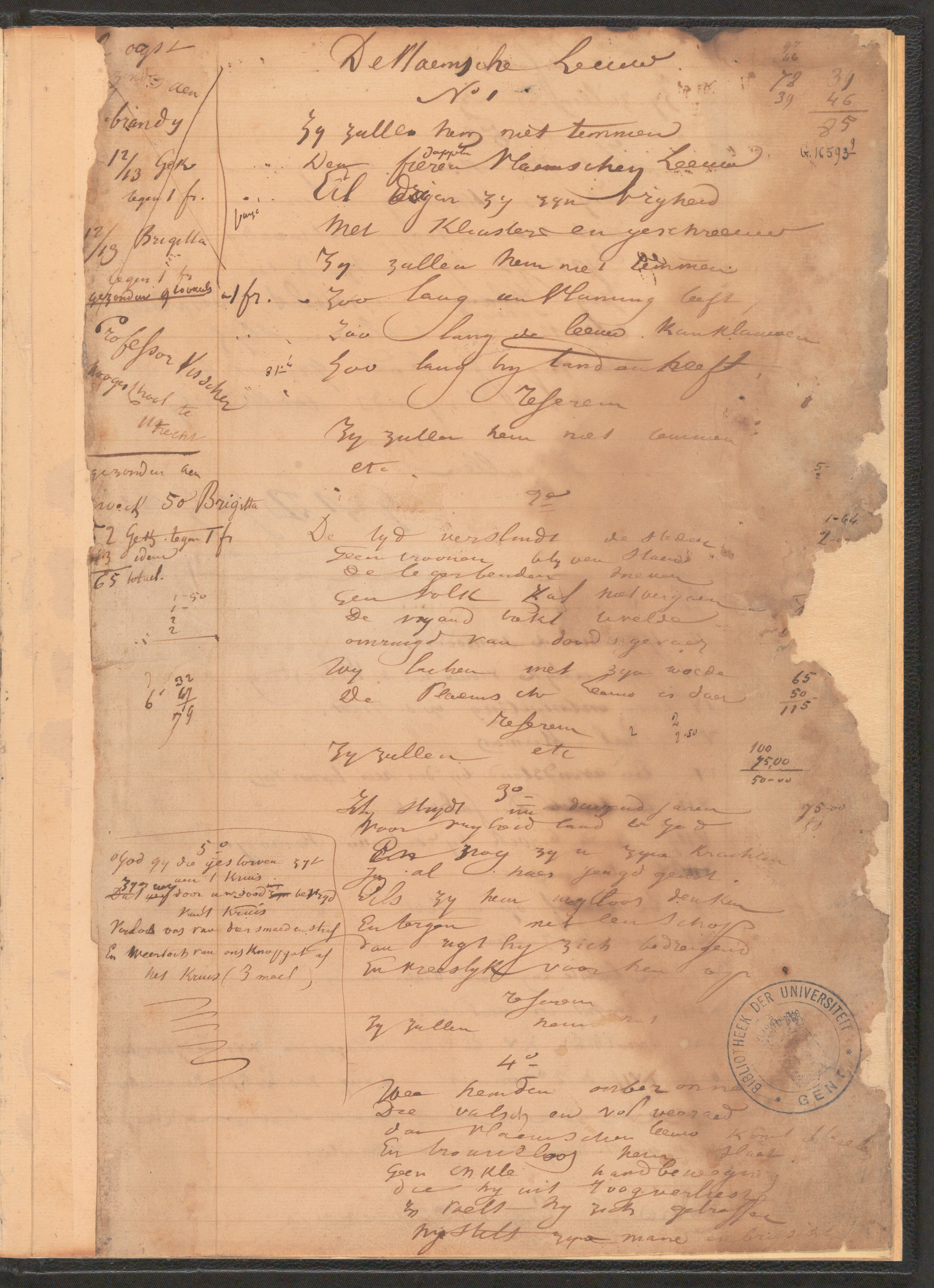
Original manuscript

The words of this anthem were written in July 1847 by Hippoliet Van Peene (1811–1864) who was clearly inspired by the song Sie sollen ihn nicht haben, / den freien Deutschen Rhein, / So lang sich Herzen laben / An seinem Feuerwein (They must never get our free German Rhine, As long as hearts relish its fiery wine) by the German author Nikolaus Becker.

The music, by Karel Miry (1823–1899), is apparently influenced by Robert Schumann's Sonntags am Rhein.

Like France's Marseillaise, De Vlaamse Leeuw is a nationalist battle song. Franco-Belgian political tension in the mid-19th century made the Flemish public mood ripe for such an expression of regional feeling. At the time, it was not meant as anti-Belgian (as it often came to be seen by Flemish separatists and their Belgicist opponents), for the "enemy" it refers to is Belgium's southwestern neighbour France, as in the 1302 Battle of the Golden Spurs.

Around 1900, the anthem was in general use among Flemish militants.

On 6 July 1973, a decree by the then Cultural Council for the Dutch Cultural Community (the precursor of the present Flemish Parliament) proclaimed the first two stanzas to be the official national anthem of Flanders. The text and musical notation were officially published on 11 July 1985.

== Lyrics ==
Only the first two stanzas and their refrains are performed.

Flemish original

I
Zij zullen hem niet temmen, de fiere Vlaamse Leeuw,
Al dreigen zij zijn vrijheid met kluisters en geschreeuw.
Zij zullen hem niet temmen, zolang een Vlaming leeft,
Zolang de Leeuw kan klauwen, zolang hij tanden heeft.

Refrein:
Zij zullen hem niet temmen,
zolang een Vlaming leeft,
𝄆 Zolang de Leeuw kan klauwen,
zolang hij tanden heeft. 𝄇

II
De tijd verslindt de steden, geen tronen blijven staan:
De legerbenden sneven, een volk zal nooit vergaan.
De vijand trekt te velde, omringd van doodsgevaar.
Wij lachen met zijn woede, de Vlaamse Leeuw is daar!

Refrein

III
Hij strijdt nu duizend jaren voor vrijheid, land en God;
En nog zijn zijne krachten in al haar jeugdgenot.
Als zij hem machteloos denken en tergen met een schop,
Dan richt hij zich bedreigend en vrees'lijk voor hen op.

Refrein

IV
Wee hem, de onbezonnen', die vals en vol verraad,
De Vlaamse Leeuw komt strelen en trouweloos hem slaat.
Geen enkle handbeweging die hij uit 't oog verliest:
En voelt hij zich getroffen, hij stelt zijn maan en briest.

Refrein

V
Het wraaksein is gegeven, hij is hun tergen moe;
Met vuur in't oog, met woede springt hij den vijand toe.
Hij scheurt, vernielt, verplettert, bedekt met bloed en slijk
En zegepralend grijnst hij op's vijands trillend lijk.

Refrein

English translation

I
Ne'er shall they tame him, the proud Flemish Lion,
Even if they threaten with chains and roars his freedom.
Ne'er shall he be tamed, so long as one Fleming liveth,
So long as the Lion can claw, so long as he hath teeth.

Chorus:
Ne'er shall he be tamed,
so long as a Fleming liveth.
𝄆 So long as the Lion can claw
so long as he hath teeth. 𝄇

II
Time devoureth cities, ne'er shall thrones last,
Armies may topple, but a folk dieth not.
Besieged by grievous danger, the foe cometh marching in;
We laugh at his anger: the Flemish Lion is there!

Chorus

III
For a millenium hath he fought for God, land and freedom,
And yet his strength, as spry as ever.
If anyone thinketh of him feeble or taunt him,
With menace and coercion shall he rear.

Chorus

IV
Pardon the brutish who, sham and of faith not,
Pet the Flemish Lion then batter.
A single motion he seeth not;
If vexed he shall raise his manes and roar.

Chorus

V
Revenge hath come, tired of their bait;
Amidst his rage, he pounceth the foe in spite
Which he teareth, crusheth, killeth, covereth in blood and mud,
And in victory sneereth o'er his foe's fallen corpse.

Chorus

== See also ==
- De Leeuw van Vlaanderen (The Lion of Flanders, synonymous title, but also the nickname of its hero, the medieval Count Robert III of Flanders and the title of the Flemish national epic by Hendrik Conscience).
- Flag of Flanders, featuring a lion
- La Brabançonne
- Le Chant des Wallons
