= Émile Mathieu (composer) =

Belgian music teacher and composer

Émile Louis Victor Mathieu (Lille, 18 October 1844 – Ghent, 20 August 1932) was a Belgian music teacher and composer of classical music.

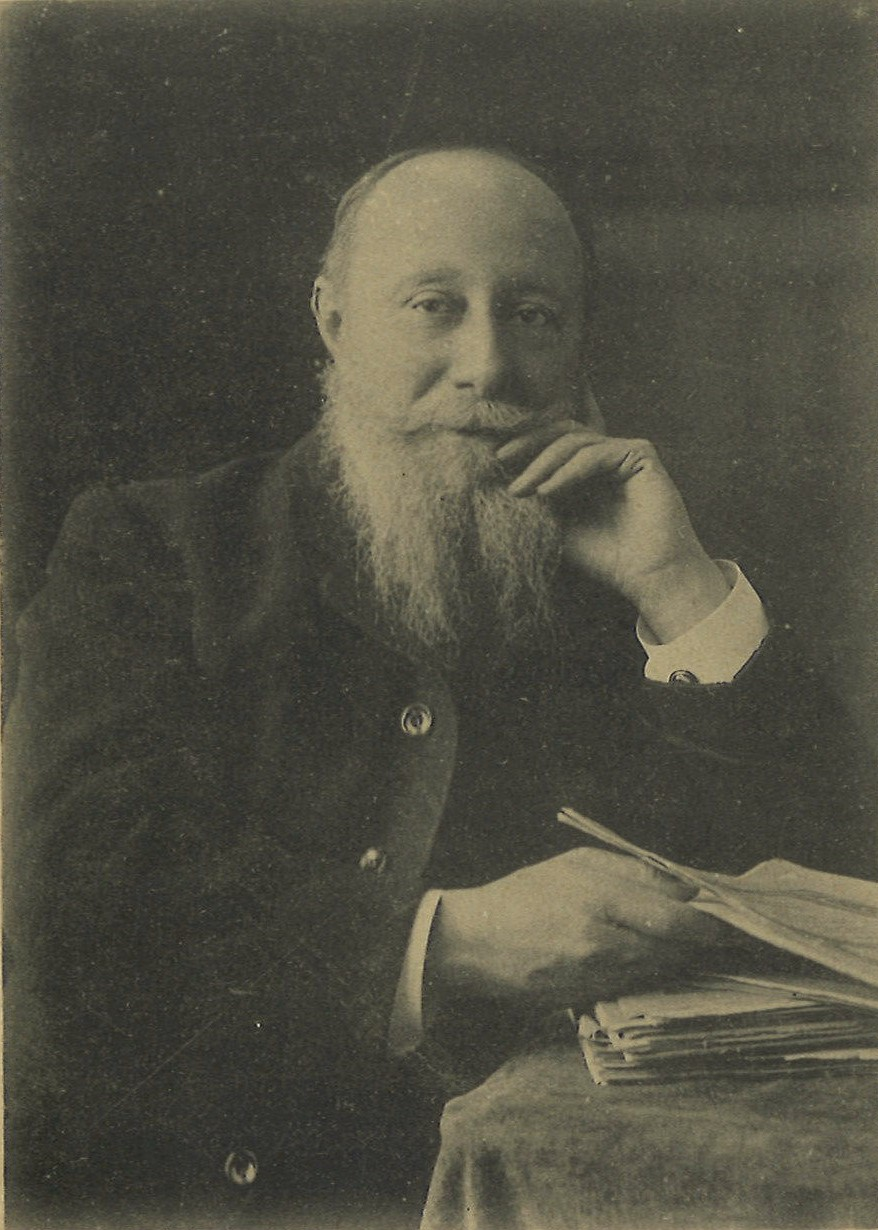
Emile Mathieu, November 26, 1907

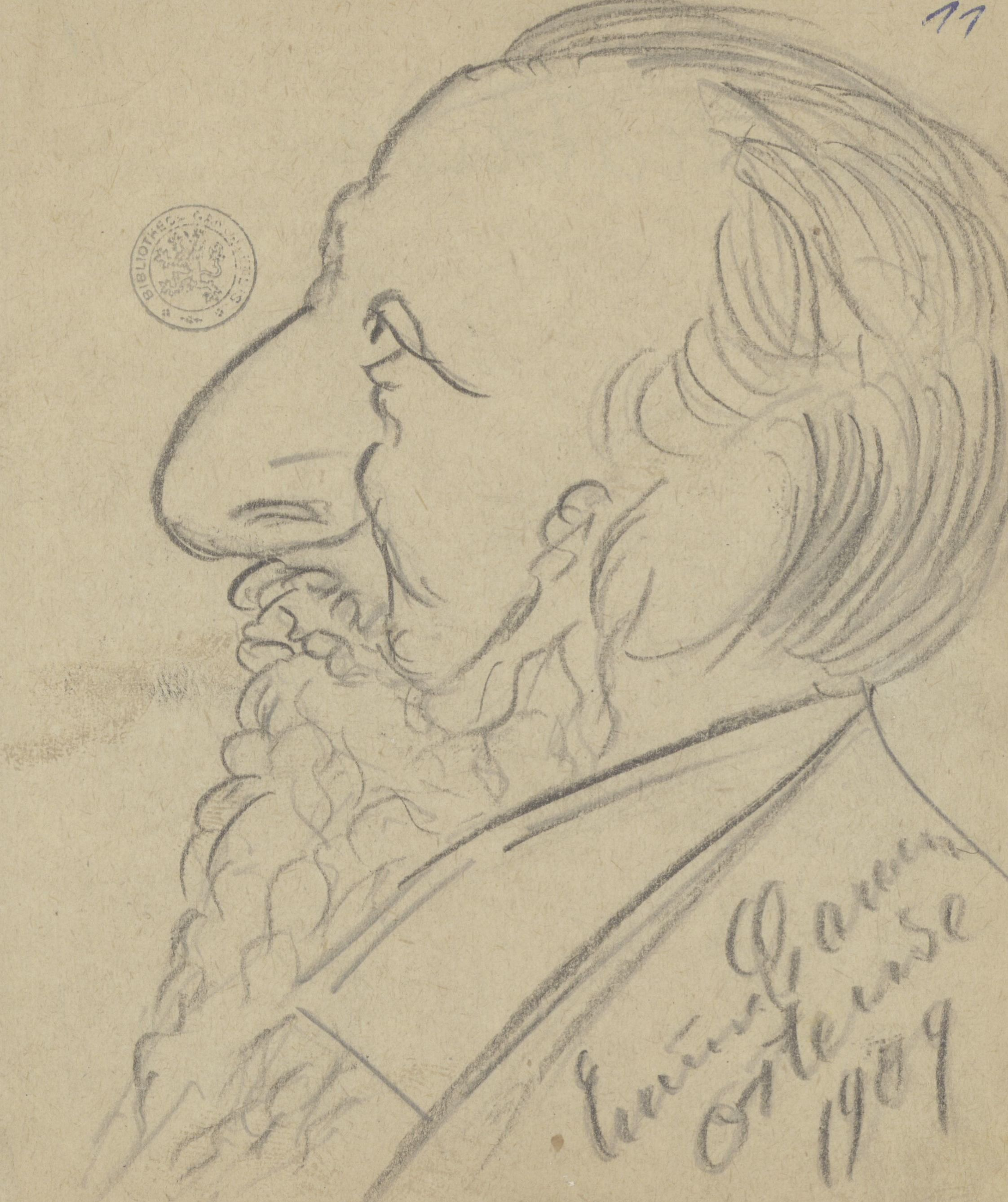
More than likely a portrait of Emile Mathieu drawn by Enrico Caruso, 1909, Ghent University Library

Mathieu was born into a musical family: his father was the director of a theatre in Antwerp and a singer, while his mother taught singing at the Académie des Beaux-Arts of Leuven. He studied at the Conservatory of Brussels and later became a teacher of piano and harmony at the conservatory of Leuven. In 1867 Mathieu won a second prize in the Prix de Rome contest with his cantata Torquato Tasso’s dood. He won first place in the same contest in 1871 and again in 1873. Between 1873 and 1875 he lived in Paris, where he conducted the orchestra of the Théâtre du Châtelet. Afterwards, he returned to Brussels, where he held a position as accompanist at the Theatre Royal of LA Monnaie.

He headed the Leuven Conservatory (which today is called SLAC) from 1881, and succeeded Adolphe Samuel as director of the Ghent Conservatory from 1898 to 1924. He was also a member of the Académie Royale de Belgique.

His compositions include 7 operas, 3 symphonic poems, concertos for piano and violin, a Te Deum and choral works. Most of his operas used librettos of his own writing.

His best known work today is "Freyhir", an hour-long choral tone poem written in 1883 on the theme of deforestation around Ardennes where the composer grew up. Freyhir is the legendary name of the forest.

== Recordings ==
- Freyhir. Patrick Delcour, Marc Laho, Christine Solhosse, Véronique Solhosse, Chœur symphonique de Namur, Brussels Choral Society, Orchestre Philharmonique de Liège et de la Communauté Wallonie-Bruxelles / Jean-Pierre Haeck. Cypres
