= Edward Potjes =

Dutch-born composer and pianist (1860–1931)

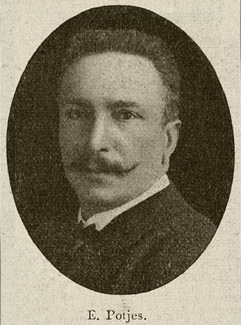
Edward Potjes

Edward Potjes (born Eduard Adriaan Nicolaas; in French Edouard-Adrien-Nicolas) was a Dutch-born composer and piano virtuoso.

Born in Nijmegen (the Netherlands) on 13 August 1860, Potjes began his music studies at the age of 7. He received the rudiments of piano from P. Van Merkestein, and learned harmony and counterpoint from Grégoire Van Dyck in Boxmeer. From 1878 to 1880 he attended composition classes by Richard Hol. After that, at Cologne, he was pupil of Ferdinand Hiller (composition) and of Jacob Kwast (piano). He graduated from the University of Belgium in 1887.

After completing his studies, Potjes established in Antwerp as a music teacher and in 1885 he had the opportunity to be heard by Liszt; following his advice he applied for the position of piano teacher at the Strasbourg Pādagogium and was accepted. He soon left Strasbourg to make an artistic tour in the Netherlands. In 1887, he moved back to Antwerp, continuing to make numerous artistic tours in England and France.

When the professor of piano at the Conservatory of Ghent, Max Heynderickx, died on 12 June 1893, a competition was held for his replacement. Several talented artists applied for the position, but the jury decided for Potjes, and he was confirmed by a royal decree on 29 December 1893.

In 1917 he resigned the post he had held for twenty-two years as head of the Virtuoso Piano Department at the Royal Conservatory of Ghent to immigrate to the United States as a war refugee. He moved to Seattle in 1922, and became a U.S. citizen in 1924. He toured many European countries as a concert pianist, and composed several grand operas. For one year, Potjes taught piano, harmony and composition at the Cornish School. After that, Potjes devoted his time to composing and to teaching private classes.

On 15 November 1921, Potjes was designated Officer of the Order of Leopold by royal decree.

Potjes was regarded as a virtuoso, receiving positive reception for his concert performances. it can be cited his recital in Liège dedicated to the members of the Legia in January 1896; the one he presented in January 1897 at the Salle Pleyel in Paris, where his performances of a varied repertoire (Bach, Tausig, Liszt, Chopin, Saint-Saëns, Rachmaninoff, Schumann, Beethoven, etc.) were well received. And the "Piano Recital Beethoven", at the Cercle des Concerts d'hiver in January 1899, where he performed four Beethoven sonatas to a positive reception.

On 1 December 1930, the Seattle Symphony Orchestra, in concert, played his tone poem "Easter Morning" from his opera "Salome's Jewel Box". Potjes died on 4 January 1931 at Columbus Hospital, in Seattle, United States.

== Works ==
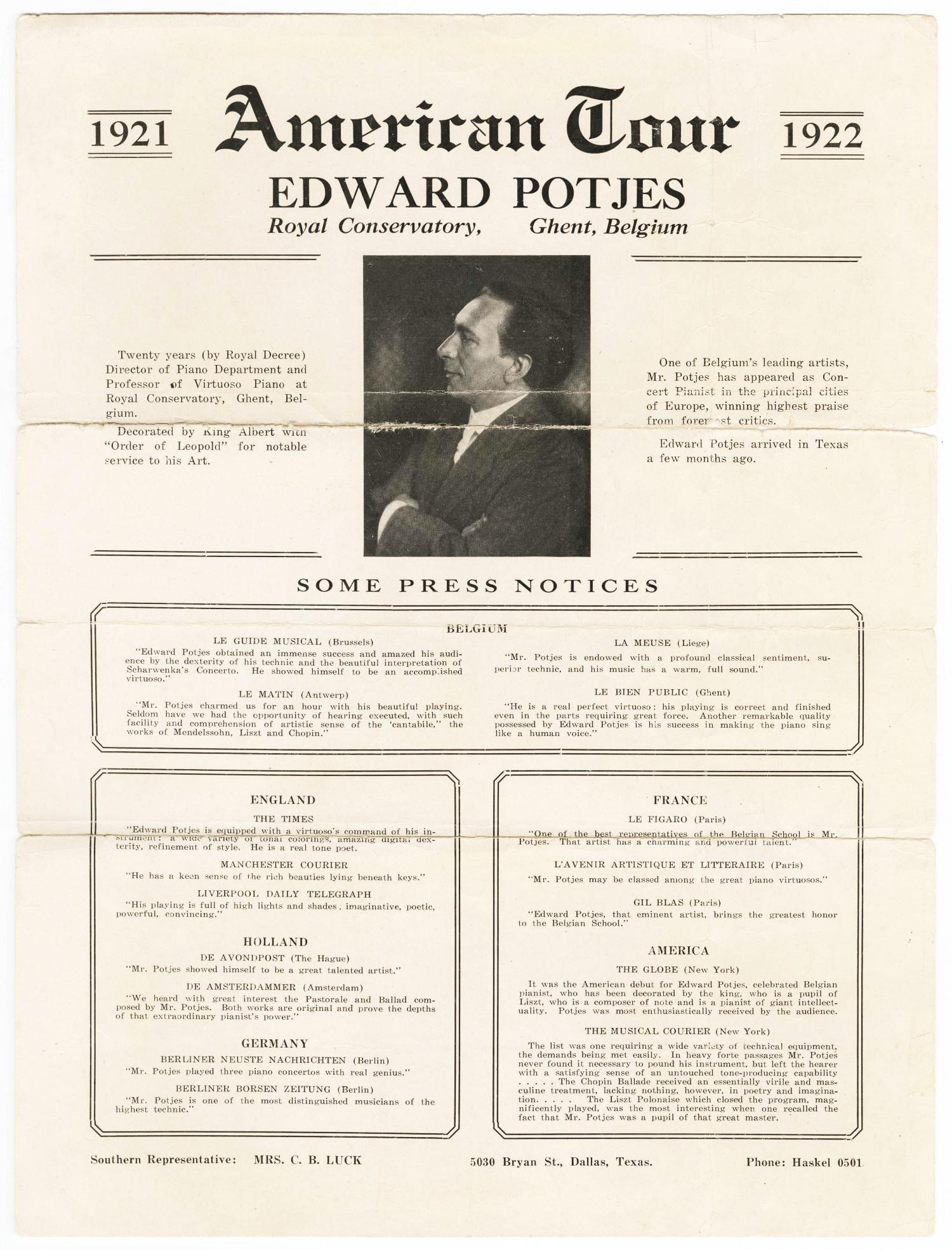
Flyer of Edward Potjes's 1921-22 American Tour

Edward Potjes was a prolific composer. Following is a list of his compositions up to 1901:

- 1. Grande valse for piano (op. 1) (Ed. A. Uhrig, Cologne)
- 2. Liedercyclus, in German (op. 2)
- 3. Andante for piano (op. 3) (Ed. Augener et Cie., London)
- 4. Ballade, id. (op. 4) (Ed. Schott frères, Bruxels)
- 5. Pastorale, id. (op. 5) (Ed. Augener et Cie., London)
- 6. 2de. valse-caprice, id. (op. 6) (id.)
- 7. Trost der Gerechtigheid, aria (op. 7)
- 8. Drei lieder (op. 8) (Ed. Schott frères, Bruxels) :
  A) Liebster! Nur dich sch'n
  B) Christgeschenk
  C) Ich wollte dasz der Frieden
- 9. Villanella, for piano (op. 9) (Ed. Augener et Cie., London)
- 10. Deux danses (op. 10), id. :
  A) Danse des Aulnes
  B) Danse hongroise
- 11. Valse brillante, in G flat major, id. (op. 11) (id.)
- 12. Nocturne in F sharp major, id. (op. 12)
- 13. Berceuse for guitar and piano (op. 13) (id.)
- 14. Deux danses (op. 14) (Ed. Augener et Cie., London) :
  A) Danse hongroise
  B) Petite valse
- 15. Trois morceaux (op. 15) (Ed. Holzmann, Zürich) :
  A) Gavotte
  B) Nocturne
  C) Air de Ballet
- 16. Illustrations, id., based on the novel by Bulwer Lytton : The last days of Pompeii (op. 16)
- 17. Messe for soprano, tenor and bass, with organ accomp. (harp and strings ad libitum) (op. 17)
- 18. Quatre consolations, for piano (op. 18)
- 19. Bal champêtre, six dances for piano (op. 19) (Ed. Augener et Cie., London) :
  A) Marche
  B) Valse
  C) Intermède (Les Gnomes)
  D) Mazurka
  E) Polka
  F) Galop
- 20. Fantaisie hongroise Czardas for four-hand piano (op. 20)
- 21. Illusions de jeunesse, for piano (op. 21) (Ed. Augener et Cie., London) :
  A) Sérénade
  B) Danse féerique
  C) Idylle
  D) Rêverie
  E) Prière
  F) Bonheur accompli (valse)
- 22. Deux morceaux, id. (op. 22) :
  A) La Babillarde
  B) L'Espiègle
- 23. Sonate, id. (op. 23)
- 24. Envoi de fleurs, works for piano (op. 24) (Ed. Me. Beyer, Ghent) :
  A) Lilas
  B) Aubépine
  C) Pensée
  D) Pervenche
  E) Oeillet
  F) Rose
- 25. Paraphrase de concert, work for piano based on an air (op. 25)
- 26. Sonate, for piano and guitar (op. 26) (id.)
- 27. Quintette, for piano, 2 guitars, contralto and cello (op. 27) (id.)
- 28. Cinq pièces, for piano (op. 28) (Ed. Teerlinck, Ghent) :
  A) Luronne
  B) Berceuse
  C) Sérénade
  D) Marche nuptiale
  E) Mutine
- 29. Cinq pièces, for piano (album for the youth) (op. 29) (Ed. Me. Beyer, Ghent) :
  A) Chant de Noël
  B) La Gracieuse
  C) La Danse des Bayadères
  D) Romance
  E) Les Patineurs

=== Compositions without indication of opus ===
- 1. Feuillet d'Album (Ed. Augener et Cie., London)
- 2. Angelus, lied in Flemish (Ed. Faes, Antwerp)
- 3. Lamentation, air dramatique
- 4. Chanson d'hiver, for voice and piano (Ed. Teerlinck, Ghent)
- 5. Ariane, grand opera in three acts, text by Charles Duprez
