= Paul Lebrun =

Belgian composer and professor

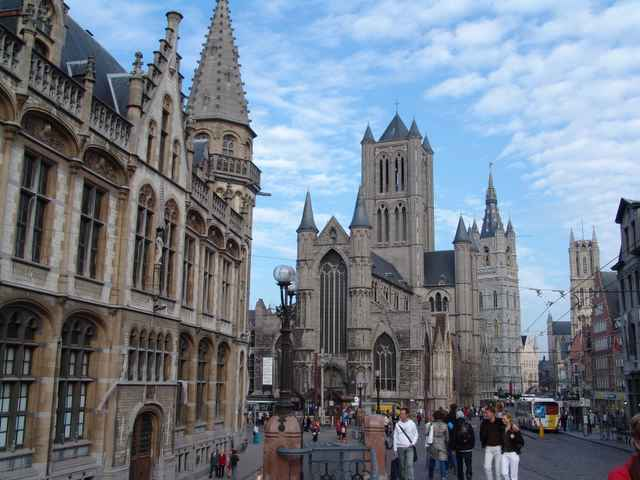
Ghent: hometown of Lebrun (from left: Old post office, Saint-Nicholas Church, Belfry, and Saint Bavo Cathedral).

Composer Paul-Henri-Joseph Lebrun (21 April 1863 – 4 November 1920) was a Belgian composer and professor at the Ghent Conservatory, who won the Belgian Prix de Rome for music in 1891.

== Life and work ==
Paul-Henri-Joseph Lebrun was born on April 21, 1863, in Ghent, Belgium. He studied as a pupil at the Ghent Conservatory. In 1891, in his late twenties, he won the Belgian Prix de Rome for music, with his cantata Andromeda. He also won first prize of the Belgian Academie, for a symphony.

In 1890, he had become a professor of music theory at the Ghent Conservatory and conductor of the "Orphéon" at Cambrai. In 1895, Lebrun also became conductor of the "Cercle artistique" at Ghent. He was an officer of the Legion of Honor. Works include: the opera La Fiancée d'Abydos (Ghent, 1897), orchestral compositions, and choruses. Paul-Henri-Joseph Lebrun died on November 4, 1920, in Louvain (Leuven, Belgium).

== See also ==
- Pietro Mascagni (1863–1945), composer, contemporary of Lebrun.
- Xavier Leroux (1863–1919), composer, contemporary of Lebrun.
- Pierre-Auguste Renoir, painter, contemporary of Lebrun.
