= Martin-Joseph Mengal =

Belgian composer and teacher (1784–1851)

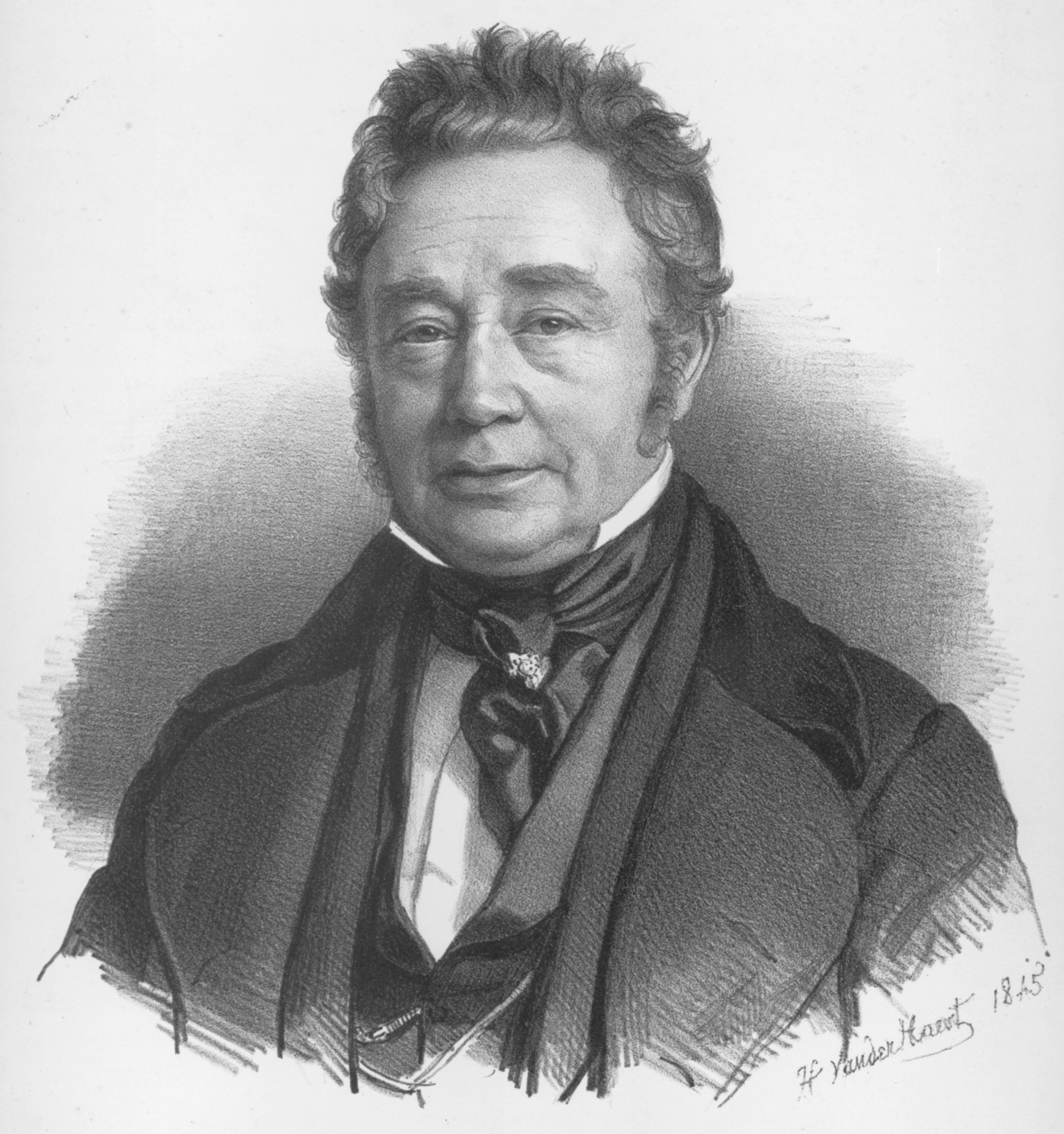
Martin-Joseph Mengal in 1845

Martin-Joseph Mengal (27 January 1784 - 4 July 1851) was a Belgian composer and teacher.

Mengal came from a musical family and received horn and violin lessons as a child, and by the age of 13 played first horn at the Ghent opera. From 1804 Mengal moved to Paris to study at the Conservatoire de Paris with Frédéric Duvernoy and Charles Simon Catel, but in December the same year he joined the French military service and marched in the War of the Third Coalition against Italy, Austria and Prussia under Napoleon I.

Mengal's connections with composer Anton Reicha and with the diplomat Charles Maurice de Talleyrand-Périgord made it possible to stage his operatic work at the Paris Opéra-Comique. In 1825 Mengal returned to Ghent, becoming conductor of the Opera Orchestra in Antwerp in 1830, and shortly afterward took the same position in The Hague. Mengal was the founding director of the Royal Conservatory of Ghent in 1835 and served as director there until his death. His students there included François-Auguste Gevaert.

His operas include Les infidèles (1823, Paris), Le Vampire ou L'Homme du néant (1826, Ghent), Apothéose de Talma (1826, Ghent), and the comic opera Un jour à Vaucluse ou Le Poète ambassadeur (1830, Ghent).

A few compositions from his younger brother Jean-Baptiste Mengal (1792–1878) have also survived.

== Sources ==
- Online biography
- This article is partially translated from the page Martin-Joseph Mengal on German Wikipedia, accessed 9/10/2010.
