= François-Auguste Gevaert =

Belgian musicologist and composer (1828–1908)

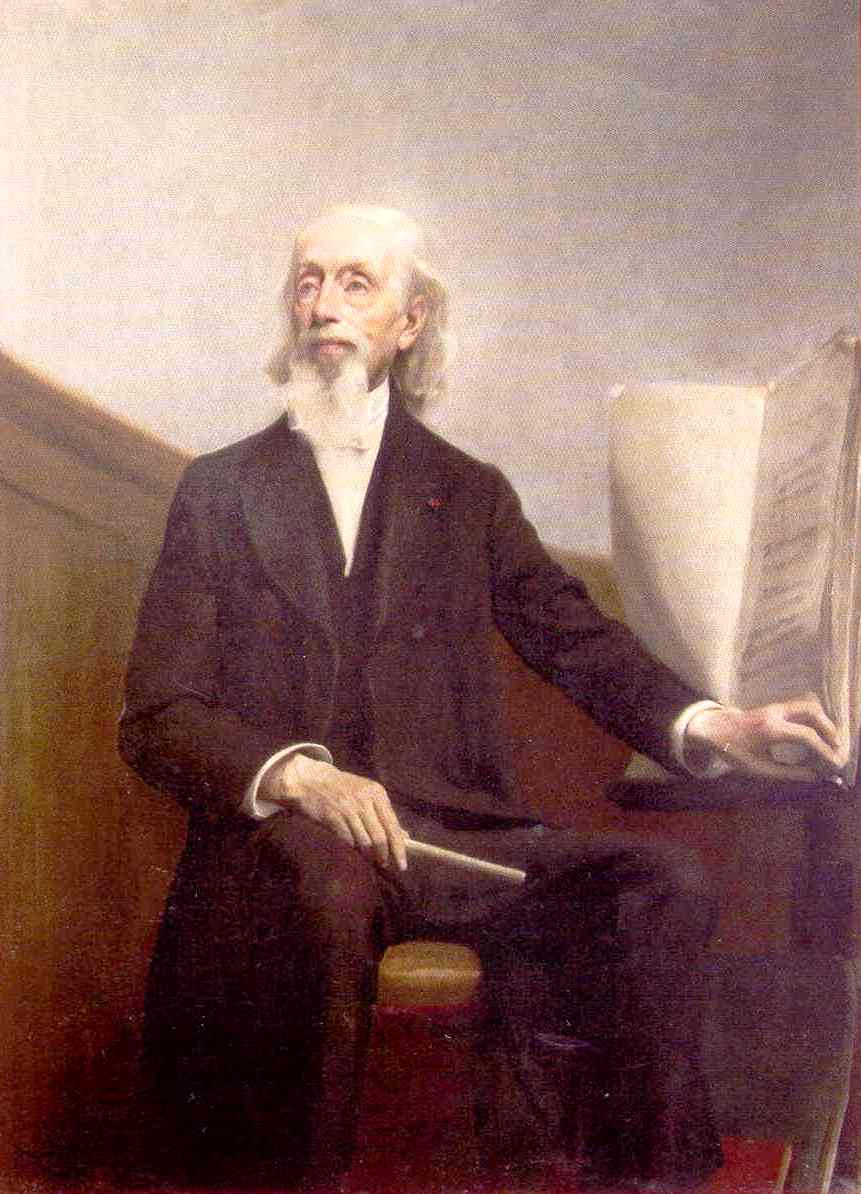
- Born: 31 July 1828; Huise, Belgium
- Died: 24 December 1908 (aged 80); Brussels, Belgium
- Occupations: Musicologist; Composer; Academic teacher

François-Auguste Gevaert (31 July 1828 – 24 December 1908) was a Belgian musicologist and composer.

== Life ==
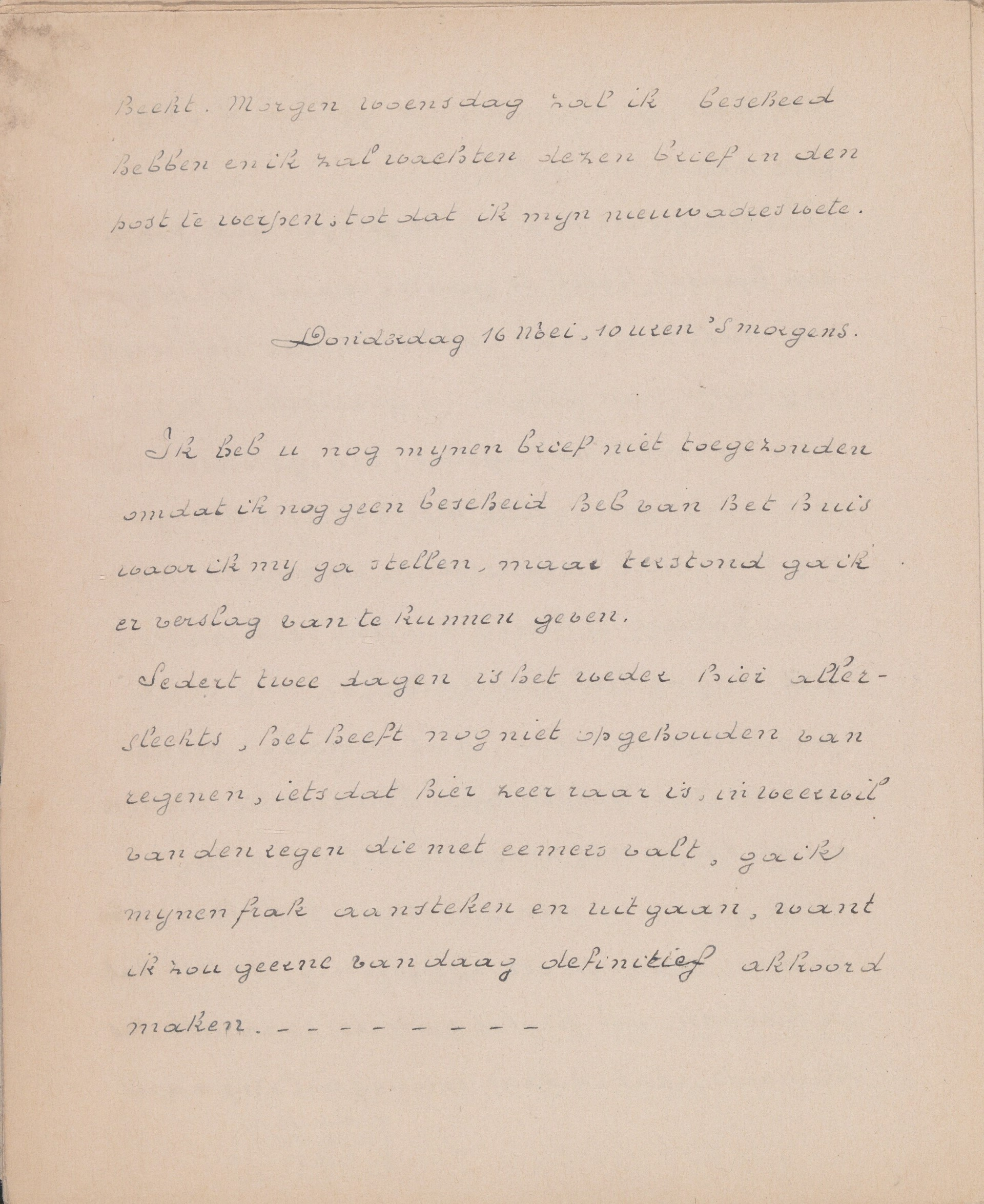
Gevaert kept a journal while travelling through different countries. This is an excerpt from the manuscript "Journey to Spain", 1850–1852.

Gevaert was born in Huise, near Oudenaarde, to an upper class family. His father was a bakery owner, and he was intended for the same profession, but better counsels prevailed and he was permitted to study music. He was sent in 1841 to the Ghent Conservatory, where he studied under Édouard de Sommere and Martin-Joseph Mengal. Then he was appointed organist of the Jesuit church in that city.

Soon Gevaert's compositions attracted attention, and he won the Belgian Prix de Rome which entitled him to two years' travel. The journey was postponed during the production of his first opera and other works. He finally embarked on it in 1849. After a short stay in Paris he went to Spain, and subsequently to Italy.

In 1867 Gevaert, having returned to Paris, became Chef de Chant at the Academie de Musique there, in succession to the popular operatic composer Fromental Halévy. Four years later, he was appointed head of the Brussels Conservatoire. In that role, he "exerted a far-reaching influence through his historical concerts, producing works of all nations and periods." Gevaert died in Brussels.

Though during his lifetime Gevaert's own music enjoyed considerable success in Belgium (it included no fewer than a dozen operas, including Quentin Durward and Le Capitaine Henriot), it is now forgotten, save for some of his choral pieces, which have recently been issued on CD by the Fuga Libera label. Nowadays he is mostly remembered, even in his native land, less as a composer than as a teacher, historian, and lecturer. His many prose writings include a Treatise on Instrumentation (still sometimes used today), a book on harmony, and a Vade Mecum for organists. Notable students of Gevaert included Alfred Wotquenne, who is best known for having provided the first thorough listing of C. P. E. Bach's compositions, whilst Gevaert's daughter Jacqueline Marthe married the singer and art historian Hippolyte Fierens-Gevaert.

== Honours ==
- 1881: Grand Officier in the Order of Leopold.
- 1896: Grand Cordon in the Order of Leopold.

== Selected works ==
- Te Deum (1843)
- Ouverture Flandre au lion (1848)
- Fantasia sobre motivos españoles (1850)
- Requiem (1853)
- "Vers l'avenir" (1905)
- Grand' Messe de Noël Puer Natus est Nobis (1907)
- Quartet for clarinet, horn, bassoon and piano

Operas

- Georgette, ou le moulin de Fontenoy (1853)
- Le billet de Marguerite (1854)
- Les lavandières de Santarem (1855)
- Quentin Durward (1858, libretto by Michel Carré and Eugène Cormon after Walter Scott
- Le diable au moulin (1859)
- La Château Trompette (1860)
- Le Capitaine Henriot (1864)

Secular cantatas

- België (1847)
- Le roi Léar (1847)
- Évocation patriotique (1856)
- De nationale verjaerdag (1857)
- Le retour de l'armée (1859)
- Jacob van Artevelde (1864) (about Jacob van Artevelde)
