= Adolphe Samuel =

Belgian composer, conductor and critic

Adolphe-Abraham Samuel
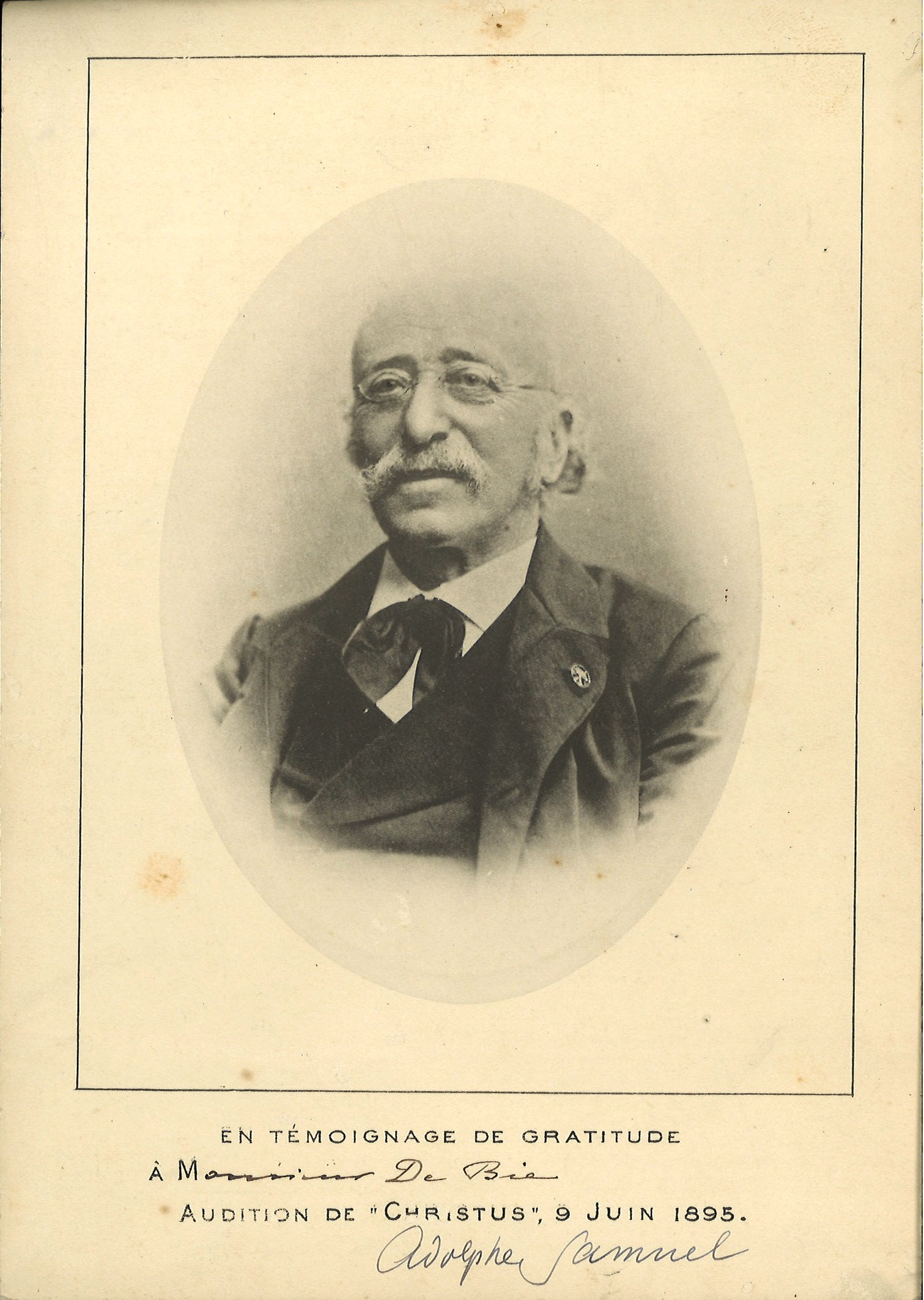
- Born: 11 July 1824; Liège, Belgium
- Died: 11 September 1898 (aged 74); Ghent, Belgium
- Occupations: Music critic, teacher, conductor, composer

Adolphe-Abraham Samuel (11 July 1824 Liège, Belgium – 11 September 1898 Ghent, Belgium) was a Belgian music critic, teacher, conductor and composer.

== Biography ==
Adolphe-Abraham Samuel was born in Liège in an artistic family. His parents encouraged him to become a painter and he began studying at the age of seven. He received his earliest music education from his sister Caroline before studying solfège and piano with Etienne Soubre and Auguste Franck and the Royal Conservatory of Liège. At the age of twelve he performed in concerts organised by the Belgian violinist Charles Auguste de Bériot and his sister-in-law Pauline Viardot. In 1840 he entered the Royal Conservatory of Brussels where he studied harmony with Charles Bosselet, counterpoint with François-Joseph Fétis, piano with Jean-Baptiste Michelot and organ with Christian Girschner, earning first prize diplomas in all these disciplines. In 1841 he became an assistant teacher for solfège at the Brussels Conservatoire and the following year an assistant teacher for piano at the same institution.

In 1845, Samuel won the Prix de Rome (Belgium) with his cantata "La Vendetta. He furthered his studies with Felix Mendelssohn in Leipzig and with Giacomo Meyerbeer in Berlin and met Ferdinand Hiller in Dresden before touring Italy for two years in 1846 and 1847. During his time in Rome he composed his opera Giovanni da Procida and his second symphony which was premiered by Fétis in Brussels in 1849.

Upon his return to Brussels in 1848 he composed many operas which were performed at La Monnaie. From 1850 to 1860 he was also active as a music critic for multiple newspapers such as Le Télégraphe, National, La Civilization, L'Echo de Bruxelles, L'indépendance belge, La Revue trimesterielle, L'Art universel and La Flandre libérale.

In 1853 he became acquainted with Hector Berlioz after reviewing "Benvenuto Cellini" and maintained correspondence with him. Samuel's works of this time were influenced by Berlioz's style. Additionally Samuel published Berlioz's "Benvenuto Cellini" in Belgium. This friendship might have come to an end due to Samuel's support of the music of Richard Wagner.

In 1860 Samuel became professor of harmony at the Brussels Conservatoire and one year later founded the Concerts Populaires de Musique Classique in Brussels. Samuel brought the more contemporary works of Richard Wagner, Franz Liszt, Peter Benoit, and Anton Rubinstein to the public in these concerts. In 1869 he also founded the Société de Musique de Bruxelles in order to perform large choral works. He resigned from these organisations in 1871.

From 1871 to 1898, Samuel was the director of the Royal Conservatory of Ghent where he additionally taught counterpoint, fugue, composition and music esthetics. Simultaneously he directed the Cercle artistique, littéraire et scientifique in Ghent from 1874 to 1880.

Samuel's own compositional work combines the influences of Berlioz, Wagner and Liszt. His principal works are the monumental programmatic Sixth symphony, based on the Old Testament (1891) and the Seventh, based on the New Testament (1893).

== Conversion and death ==
In 1895 Samuel was baptized and became a Roman Catholic, converted from Judaism late in life. He died in Ghent. At the composer's wish, his mass was presented during his funeral. His son Eugene Samuel was also a composer.

== Works ==
- Il a rêvé, comic opera, 1845
- La Vendetta, Cantata, 1845
- 1st Symphony op.8, 1846
- 2nd Symphony op.9, 1847
- Giovanni da Procida, Great Opera, 1847
- Madeleine, comic opera, (libretto: Gustave Vaëz), 1850
- Roland à Ronceveaux, Poème symphonique, 1850
- Les Deux Précendants, comic opera, (libretto: Louis Schoonen), 1851
- L'Heure de la retraite, Comic Opera, (Libretto: Eugène van Bemmel), 1854
- Cantate du jubilée, cantata, 1855
- L'Union fait la force, cantata, 1855
- 3rd Symphony op.28, 1858
- Cantate nationale, cantata op.29, 1859
- 4th Symphony op.33, 1863
- 5th Symphony op.35, 1869
- De Wederkomst, cantata, op.38, 1875
- Leopold I, cantata, 1880
- 6th Symphony (Symphony à program) op. 44, 1889
- 7th Symphony "Christ" op. 48, 1893

== Literature ==
Thierry Levaux: Le Dictionnaire of the Compositeurs de Belgique du Moyen-Age à nos jours, S. 550-551, Editions: "Art in Belgium" 2006, ISBN 2-930338-37-7.
