= Jean de Vienne (bishop, died 1351) =

French prelate and diplomat

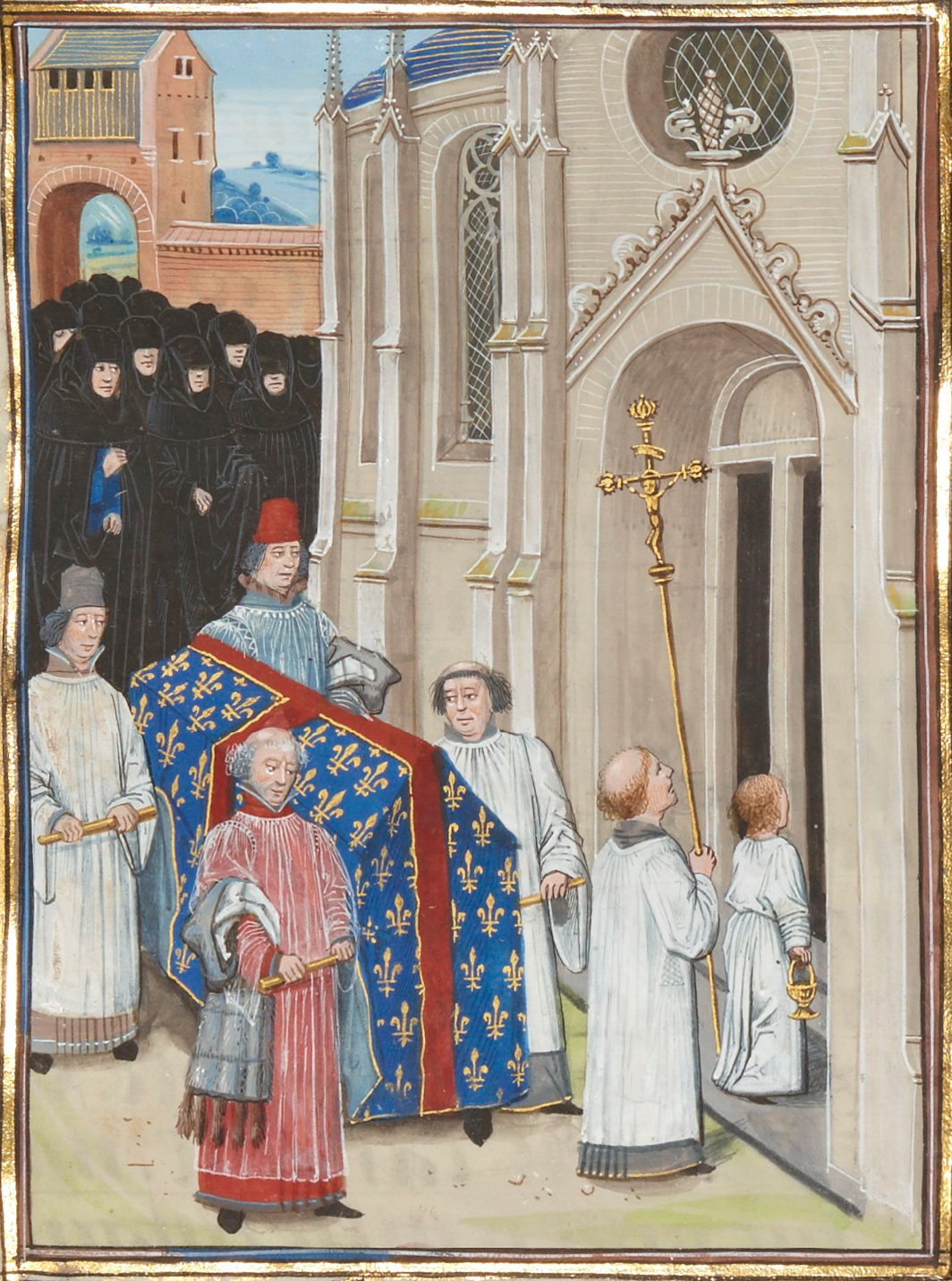
Funeral of Philip VI, at which Jean presided

Jean de Vienne (died 14 June 1351) was a French prelate and diplomat. He served as the bishop of Avranches (as Jean IV) from 1328 until he was transferred to the diocese of Thérouanne (as Jean III) in 1331. He was transferred again in 1334 to the archdiocese of Reims (as Jean II), which he held until his death. Jean twice served the king of France as an ambassador to the Holy See and once as an ambassador to Castile.

== Early life ==
Jean was the eldest of several brothers born into an old noble family of Vienne-en-Bessin in Normandy. His younger brother Renaud became archdeacon of Bayeux and later treasurer of Reims. Jean received a good education as a young man. His arms are described as "a gold chevron on a red field" (de gueules au chevron d'or).

For a time Jean served the House of Évreux, which became the ruling family of Navarre in 1328.

== Bishop of Avranches ==
Jean was elected bishop of Avranches on 20 September 1327 and made his profession to the Holy See on 17 May 1328. Following the French victory at the battle of Cassel on 23 August 1328, which ended the peasant revolt in Flanders, Jean was charged with securing conditions of peace. Philip VI empowered him to demolish the fortifications of Ypres, Courtrai and certain other cities, and to lift the sentence of excommunication imposed on the citizens of Bruges.

Something of Jean's interests can be gleaned from the agreement he made with Jean de la Porte, abbot of Mont-Saint-Michel, at his castle in Le Parc on 8 September 1329. The abbot granted Jean the right to hunt in the woods of Néron, near Champeaux, for three years. Mont-Saint-Michel was one of the most important establishments in the diocese of Avranches. On 2 February 1330, he reached another agreement with the abbot over certain rights in the village at the foot of the monastery.

In 1330, Philip VI made him Master of Requests. He was never consecrated as bishop of Avranches.

== Bishop of Thérouanne ==
Jean was transferred to the diocese of Thérouanne in 1331, making a profession of obedience to the Holy See on 4 February. Fifteen days later (19 February), he was granted control of the temporalities of his new see.

On 20 March 1332, Philip VI sent him as ambassador to the Avignon court of Pope John XXII. There, in a public consistory on 26 July 1333, Jean swore an oath that either Philip or his son John would lead a new crusade. In the end, neither ever led a crusade.

== Archbishop of Reims ==
=== Pilgrimage to Santiago de Compostela ===
Impressed by Jean's intelligence and abilities, Pope John XXII appointed him to the metropolitan see of Reims in October 1334. It was the first time the reservatio papalis (papal reservation) had been used in the case of Reims. Jean made his profession for Reims on 4 November 1334.

Jean did not initially visit his new diocese. Instead, he set off on the Way of Saint James, a pilgrimage to the saint's shrine at Santiago de Compostela in Spain. While passing through Spain, he was asked by the co-monarchs of Navarre, Philip III and Joan II, to negotiate a peace with King Alfonso XI of Castile, who had lately invaded Navarre. A truce was quickly agreed and a final peace signed on 28 February 1336.

During his long absence, the cathedral chapter of Reims sent him a letter demanding he perform the canonical visitation of his diocese. Jean instead obtained a papal dispensation and sent Guillaume Bertrand, the bishop of Noyon and one of his suffragans to perform the duty in his place. This Guillaume did in 1337.

=== War with England ===
Jean finally returned to his diocese late in 1337. He ordered all the vassals of the diocese to assemble in arms at the Porte de Mars on 31 October in order to serve against King Edward III of England. Philip VI, however, preferred a money aid and demobilized the troops of Reims. Nevertheless, Jean remained with the French army for the following two years. He did not finally make a solemn entrance into Reims until September 1339. At the same time, Philip named him captain of the city, in charge of its defences. Before the end of 1339, Jean consecrated Hugues d'Arcy, his eventual successor, as bishop of Laon. On 13 April 1340, Jean was sworn in as bishop in the cathedral. Among the canons present was the famous composer Guillaume Machaut.

Owing to the ongoing war with England, ecclesiastical life in Reims was disrupted. Matins was no longer said daily at midnight, and only one mass was performed each day before the grand altar of the cathedral. As of 1340, on certain days of the year, the canons still ate together at a communal table, an ancient practice that cannot be traced later than this date at Reims. In 1341, Jean established a Saturday mass for the Virgin to be said at the altar of the Rouelle. Guillaume Machaut and his brother Jean subsequently made a generous endowment to this mass, and in 1365 Guillaume composed the Messe de Nostre Dame for it.

Between 23 and 26 July 1344, Jean held a provincial synod in Noyon. Attended by six bishops, it published seventeen canons aimed at protecting the privileges and liberties of the church from the effects of war.

On 22 September 1342, Pope Clement VI had written to Jean asking him to assist at the foundation of a convent for Poor Clares at Mézières by Count Louis I of Flanders and his wife, Margaret, daughter of King Philip V. On 11 November 1344, Philip VI named Jean his ambassador to Clement VI and to the court of Alfonso XI of Castile. For the next eighteen months, Jean was away from his diocese. Disputes arose between the canons of Reims, the suffragan bishops and some diocesan officials. The provost, Étienne de Courtenai, called a meeting of the canons in order to once again summon Jean to his diocese, threatening otherwise to excommunicate recalcitrant officials.

According to the contemporary chronicler Giovanni Villani, Jean was present at the battle of Crécy on 26 August 1346. Following the French defeat, Philip VI confided the captaincy of Reims in Gaucher de Lor, lord of Ressons, but Jean protested and by 29 July 1347 the defence of Reims had been restored to him.

=== Final years ===
In 1347, Jean intervened with the pope on behalf of his nephews Guillaume and Jean Le Masuier, prebendaries of Bayeux and partisans of Charles II of Navarre, a rival of the Philip VI.

In 1350, Jean granted permission to Jean Panteuf, bishop of Dragonara and vicar-general and auxiliary bishop of Reims, to translate the relics of Saint Timothy to Reims.

Jean officiated the funeral of Philip VI on 28 August 1350. On 24 September at Reims, he consecrated the Philip's son John as king and his wife, Joan, as queen.

He died the following year and was buried in the sanctuary of Reims.

== Sources ==
- Azcárate Aguilar-Amat, Pilar (1989). "La guerra de 1335 entre Castilla y Navarra". Hispania. 49 (173): 805–40.
- Bled, Oscar (1904). Regestes des évêques de Thérouanne, 500–1553. Vol. 1: 500–1414. Saint-Omer: H. D'Homont.
- Cazelles, Raymond (1982). Société politique, noblesse et couronne sous Jean le Bon et Charles V. Geneva: Librairie Droz.
- Earp, Lawrence (2012) [1995]. Guillaume de Machaut: A Guide to Research. Oxford: Routledge.
- Fisquet, Honoré (1864). La France pontificale: Métropole de Reims — Reims. Paris: Étienne Repos.
