= Nicolaas Zannekin =

14th-century Flemish peasant and leader of a 1323-28 revolt in Flanders

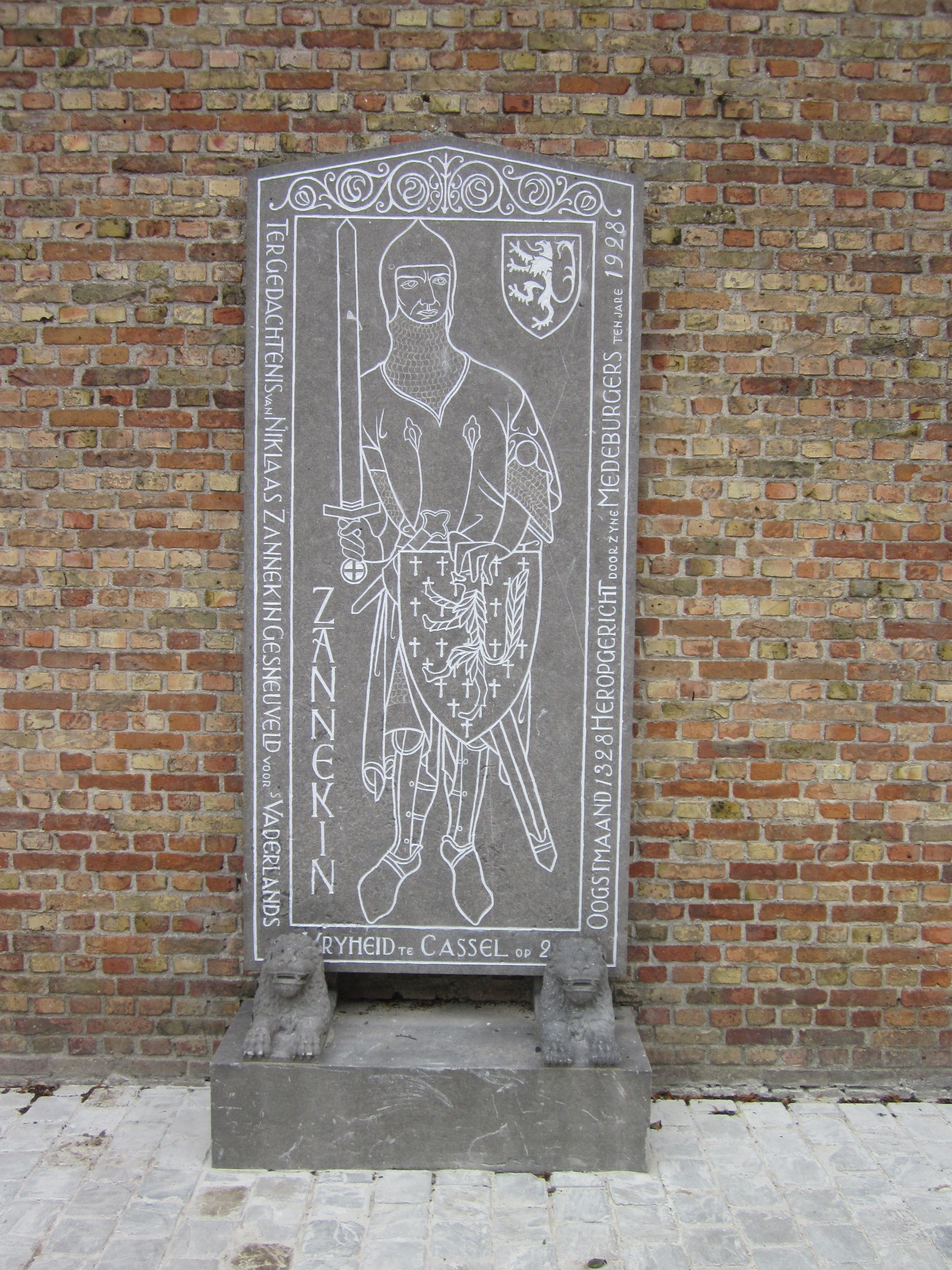
This is a photo of onroerend erfgoed number

Nicolaas Zannekin (died 23 August 1328), was a Flemish peasant leader, best known for his role in a peasant revolt in Flanders from 1323 to 1328.

Nicolaas Zannekin was a rich farmer from Lampernisse. During the early 14th century, Zannekin served as leader of the revolt in coastal Flanders against the oppressive tax policy of the Count of Flanders, Louis of Nevers. Zannekin and his men captured the towns of Nieuwpoort, Veurne, Ypres and Kortrijk. In Kortrijk, Zannekin was able to capture the Count himself. In 1325 attempts to capture Ghent and Oudenaarde failed. The King of France, Charles IV, intervened, whereupon Louis was released from captivity in February 1326 and the Peace of Arques was sealed.

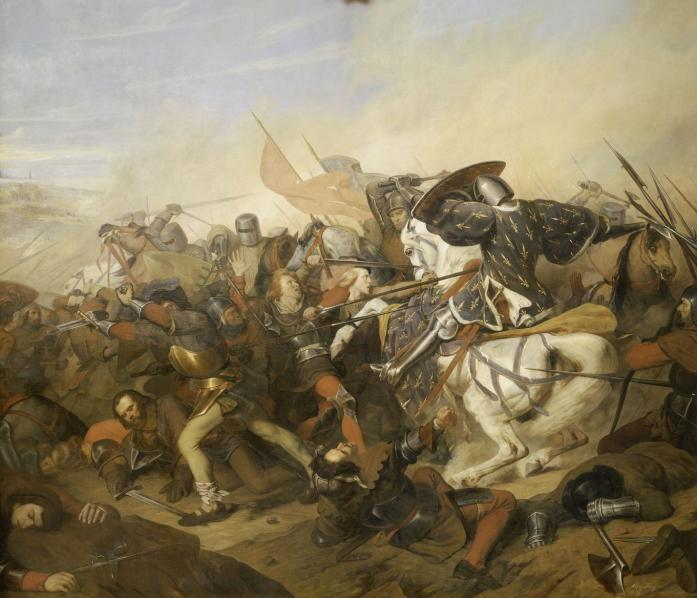
The Battle of Cassel by Hendrik Scheffer, 1837

In 1328 hostilities again erupted, causing the count to flee for France. Louis was able to convince the new king of France, Philip VI of France, to come to his aid, and Zannekin and his followers were decisively defeated by the royal French army in the Battle of Cassel (1328), where Zannekin himself was killed.
