= William Deken =

William Deken (Dutch: Willem de Deken; Bruges, c. 1274 - Paris, 24 December 1328) was a burgomaster of Bruges and leader of the 1323–1328 Flemish revolt against the count of Flanders and the King of France.

== Biography ==
William Deken joined the grocers' guild in 1305. City accounts mention him as a supplier of fish and pork.

In 1320 Deken served as a schepen (an alderman) of Bruges and in that capacity became head of a delegation that went to negotiate with King Edward II of England on behalf of the Count of Flanders, Robert of Béthune.

In 1324, still a schepen, he again went on a diplomatic mission to England, this time by the order of Louis I, Count of Flanders. During an extended stay, he attempted to negotiate a peace treaty. Meanwhile, a revolt against Count Louis I has broken out in the Flemish coastal region.

== The uprising ==
In February 1328, Bruges rejected the re-appointment of the city magistrate proposed by the count's administration. Instead the city appointed its own officials, the process in which Deken took on the important function of the burgomaster, chairing the city council and being charged with preserving order and directing military affairs.

In June 1328 he traveled again to England to persuade the young King Edward III to assume the title of King of France and to provide military support to the rebels. He received no response. On his return he took command of the Bruges troops and was defeated in the battle of Cassel.

After the defeat Deken fled to Brabant, where he hoped to convince duke John III to rise against the newly crowned King of France Philip VI. The duke not only did not respond, but handed over Deken to France. The Parlement of Paris convicted him of high treason, had his hands cut off, then had him dragged through the city streets and hanged.

== Sources ==
- E. VARENBERG, Guillaume De Deken, in: Biographie nationale de Belgique, T. V, Brussel, 1876, col. 78–81.
- Raoul VAN CAENEGEM, Nota over de terechtstelling van Willem de Deken in 1328, in: Handelingen van het Genootschap voor geschiedenis te Brugge, 1955, Blz. 140-142
- André VANDEWALLE, Willem de Deken: volksleider en makelaar, in: Handelingen van het Genootschap voor geschiedenis te Brugge, 1978, blz. 207-211
- Jacques SABBE, Vlaanderen in Opstand, 1323-1328, Brugge, 1992
