= Treaty of Athis-sur-Orge =

1305 treaty ending the Franco-Flemish War

Coat of arms of the counts of Flanders.

The Treaty of Athis-sur-Orge was a peace treaty signed on 23 June 1305 between King Philip IV of France and Robert III of Flanders. The treaty was signed at Athis-sur-Orge after the Battle of Mons-en-Pévèle and concluded the Franco-Flemish War (1297–1305).

Despite winning the battle at Mons-en-Pévèle, Philip's kingdom was too financially and militarily drained to take advantage of it. The treaty instead imposed a heavy price.

== Terms ==
The cities of Lille, Douai, and Orchies were allocated to the French crown. In return, the treaty's terms allowed Flanders to preserve its independence with the Count of Flanders but as a fiefdom of France. At the same time, the treaty provided a yearly penalty of 20,000 pond and reparations of 400,000 pond paid by the Flemish. They also were required to furnish Philip with 600 knights and to tear down the fortresses around large cities. Bruges was mandated to send 3,000 individuals on pilgrimage, and 1,000 of them were required to travel overseas.

Robert III of Flanders faced the impossible task of placating the French monarchy and trying to keep the Flemish cities from revolting. It was not until after 1309 that some monetary reparations were paid.

== Uprisings ==
Because the financial terms of the treaty were so severe, it was met with wide disapproval in Flanders. In June 1310, Pope Clement V, under pressure from Philip, stated that those who failed to fulfill the terms of the treaty would be excommunicated. Aardenburg and Ghent suffered riots in 1311 during tax collection. Flemish farmers and the middle class were hit the hardest, and the Peasant Revolt in Flanders broke out in 1323.

The peasants' revolt turned into a popular uprising, which dominated politics for five years in Flanders. It was crushed in 1328 at the Battle of Cassel.

== See also ==
- List of treaties
- Peasant revolt in Flanders 1323–1328

== Sources ==
- Jordan, William Chester (1995). "The Capetians from the death of Philip II to Philip IV". In Abulafia, David; Jones, Michael (eds.). The New Cambridge Medieval History. Vol. 5, c. 1198–c. 1300. Cambridge University Press.
- Kittell, Ellen E. (1991). From Ad Hoc to Routine: A Case Study in Medieval Bureaucracy. University of Pennsylvania Press.
- Strickland, Matthew (2010). "The Wars of Philip the Fair and his Successors, 1285–1328". In Rogers, Clifford J. (ed.). The Oxford Encyclopedia of Medieval Warfare and Military Technology. Vol. 2: East-Menf. Oxford University Press.
- Sumption, Jonathan (1999). The Hundred Years War. Vol. 1, Trial by Battle. University of Pennsylvania Press.
- TeBrake, William H. (1993). A Plague of Insurrection: Popular Politics and Peasant Revolt in Flanders, 1323–1328. University of Pennsylvania Press.
- Verbruggen, J. F. (1997). The Art of Warfare in Western Europe During the Middle Ages: From the Eighth Century to 1340. The Boydell Press.
