= Bonin family =

Noble patrician family in Bruges, Belgium

The Bonin family (also spelled Bovin, Boonem, de Bonin, van Boonen) was a patrician family of Bruges. Members of the Bonin family were active in Bruges from the 12th century until the end of the 15th century.

== Etymology ==
"Bonin" is the Latin spelling of the name, which is typically spelled "Van Boonen" today. The name was written as "Boonem" in Old Dutch and "de Bonin" in French. Until the second half of the 19th century, when the importance of exact quotations was increasingly recognised, not much attention was paid to spelling. Consequently, the surname also appears in historical accounts as "Bonyn" (with a Greek 'y' instead of 'i'). Other spellings on record include "Bonijn", "Bovin", "Bovyn" and "Bovijn".

In Jacques de Meyer's (Meyerus) book "Annales sive historiae rerum Belgicarum" from 1580, it can be found that Bovin's "v" was also written as "u". That book contains an account of a peace between the Bovin and Gruuthuyse families, initiated in 1377 by Margaret of Bavaria, mother of Philip the Good of Burgundy.

== History ==
Egidius Bonin was the first documented member of the family. In 1286, Egidius became dean of the Deanery of St. Donatien.

In the early 14th century, the Bonin family was responsible for building one of the most important stone buildings in Bruges: the House with the Seven Towers on the High Street, which would have been an ostentatious display of the family's prestige and wealth.

During the 13th, 14th, and 15th centuries, the family had a powerful presence in the city council, as councillors or treasurers. Many Bonins were members of the collegebof Aldermen. Lambert Bonin, as leader of the east vrye, participated in the Battle of Cassel in 1328.

Some Bonin family members had higher ambitions and became City council members. City council positions were held by one or perhaps two consecutive Jan Bonins in 1367, 1369, 1371, 1375, 1377 and 1378; in 1417 and 1420, Thomas Bonin was a City councillor.

Finally, several Bonins became aldermen, a position held by Jan Bonin in 1364, 1368, 1370, 1372 and 1392.

== Genealogy ==
Corneille Gailliard and Jonkheer Theophile Augustin Casetta attempted a genealogy of the Bonin family in 1689. This genealogy was not published, and people only have partial knowledge of it due to quotations by others.

The most extensive genealogy is the rather confused work (c. 1860) by Jean-Jacques Gailliard, who could quote from the manuscript that was in the possession of Baron de Peelaert-van-Hoonacker from Bruges in the late 19th century.
