= Portrait of Armand Carrel =

Painting by Ary Scheffer

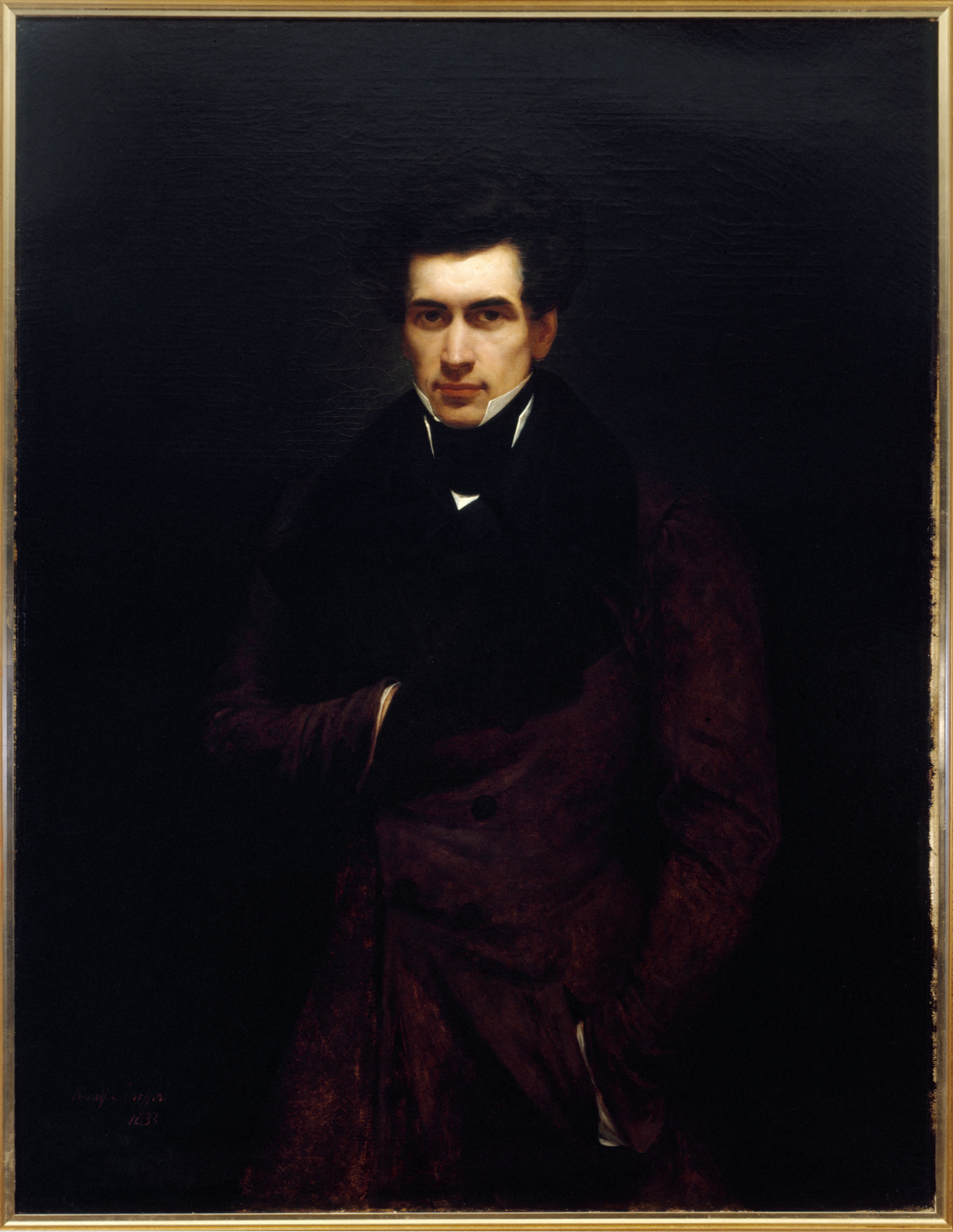
- Artist: Hendrik Scheffer
- Year: 1833
- Type: Oil on canvas, portrait painting
- Dimensions: 117 cm × 90 cm (46 in × 35 in)
- Location: Musée Carnavalet; Paris

The Portrait of Armand Carrel is an 1833 portrait painting by the Dutch-French artist Hendrik Scheffer depicting the journalist Armand Carrel. Carrel was noted for his co-founding of the Le National newspaper along with Adolphe Thiers and others. He was connected to the artist through his brother Arnold Scheffer who worked on the newspaper.

The painting was exhibited at the Salon of 1833 at the Louvre. Today it is in the collection of the Musée Carnavalet in Paris, having been acquired in 1987. Ary Scheffer, brother of Hendrik, also depicted Carrel on his deathbed in 1836.

== Bibliography ==
- Bann, Stephen. Paul Delaroche: History Painted. Reaktion Books, 1997.
- Crochemore, Gilles. Armand Carrel, 1800-1836: un républicain réaliste. Presses universitaires de Rennes, 2006.
