= The Arrest of Charlotte Corday =

Painting by Hendrik Scheffer

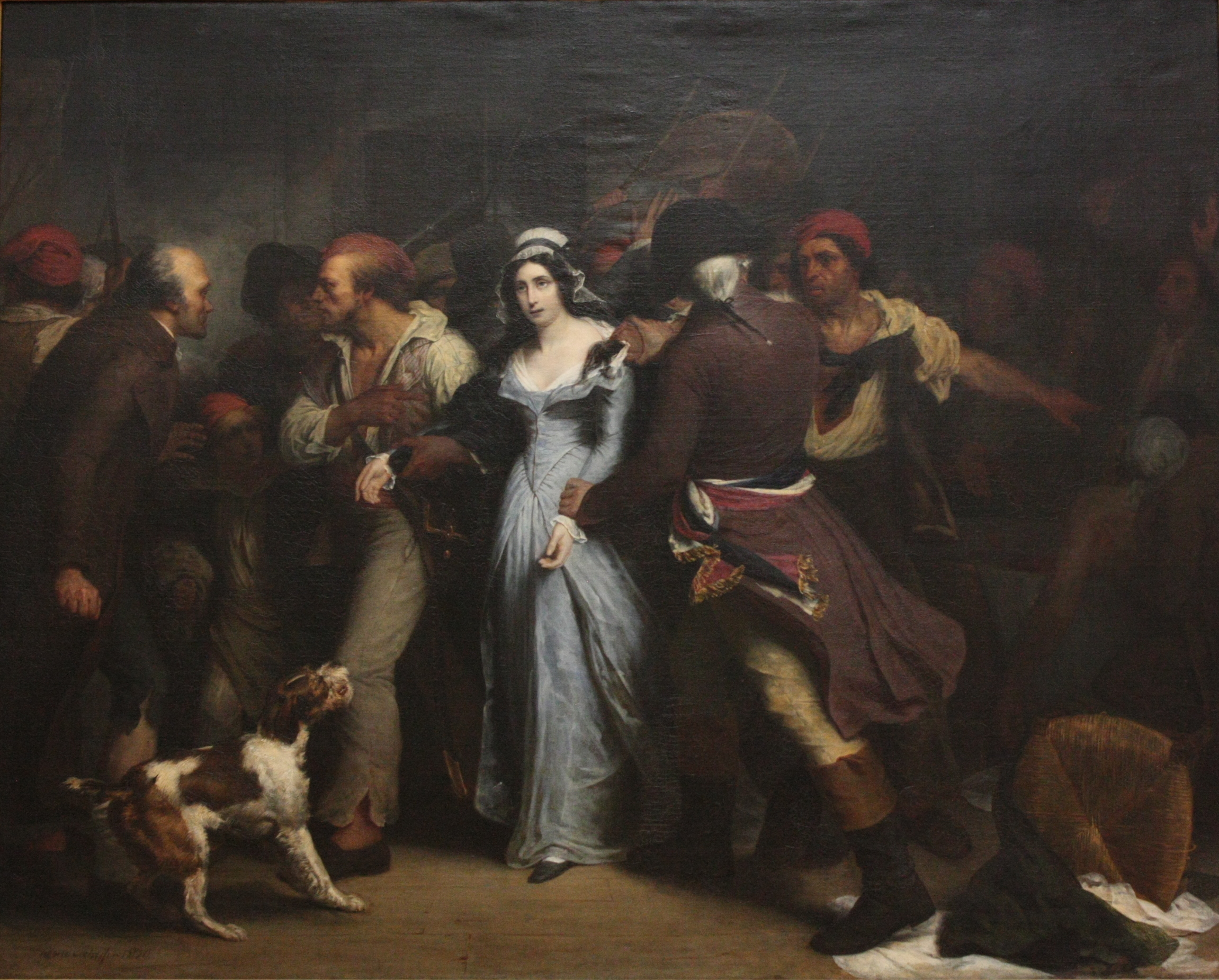
- Artist: Hendrik Scheffer
- Year: 1830
- Type: Oil on canvas, history painting
- Dimensions: 130 cm × 163 cm (51 in × 64 in)
- Location: Museum of Grenoble; Grenoble

The Arrest of Charlotte Corday (French: L'Arrestation de Charlotte Corday) is an 1830 history painting by the Dutch artist Hendrik Scheffer. Portraying a scene during the French Revolution, it depicts the arrest of Charlotte Corday following her assassination of the leading official Jean-Paul Marat. Corday, a member of the Girondist faction stabbed Marat to death while he lay in his bath on 13 July 1793 She was guillotined four days later. Corday became a symbol of the opposition during the Reign of Terror before the Fall of Maximilien Robespierre in July 1794, and continued to be a popular icon. She is shown calm and impassive despite being surrounded by hectoring sans-culottes.

Scheffer was the younger brother of Ary Scheffer, another noted artist. The painting was exhibited at the Salon of 1831 at the Louvre in Paris. It was purchased by the French state in an effort to promote national cohesion in the wake of the July Revolution of 1830, and had also been displayed at the Luxembourg Palace to raise money for those wounded in the recent revolution. Today the work is on display in the Museum of Grenoble where it has been since 1892.

== Bibliography ==
- Clair, Jean. Crime & châtiment. Gallimard, 2010.
- Dion-Tenenbaum, Anne. Marie d'Orléans, 1813-1839: Princesse et artiste romantique. Musée du Louvre, 2008.
