= François Mignet =

French journalist and historian (1796–1884)

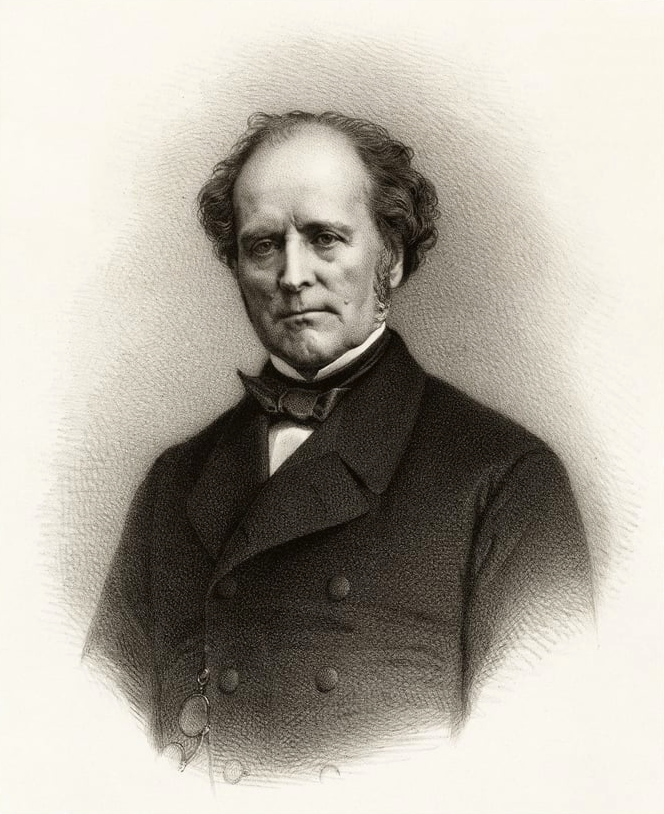
François-Auguste Mignet

François Auguste Marie Mignet (French pronunciation: [fʁɑ̃swa oɡyst maʁi miɲɛ], 8 May 1796 – 24 March 1884) was a French journalist and historian of the French Revolution.

== Biography ==
He was born in Aix-en-Provence (Bouches-du-Rhône), France. His father was a locksmith from the Vendée, who enthusiastically accepted the principles of the French Revolution and encouraged liberal ideas in his son. François had brilliant success at Avignon in the lycée where he became a teacher in 1815. He returned to Aix to study law, and in 1818 was called to the bar, where his eloquence would have ensured his success had he not been more interested in the study of history. His abilities were shown in an Éloge de Charles VII, which was honoured by the Académie de Nîmes in 1820, and a memoire on Les Institutions de Saint Louis, which in 1821 was honoured by the Académie des Inscriptions et Belles Lettres.

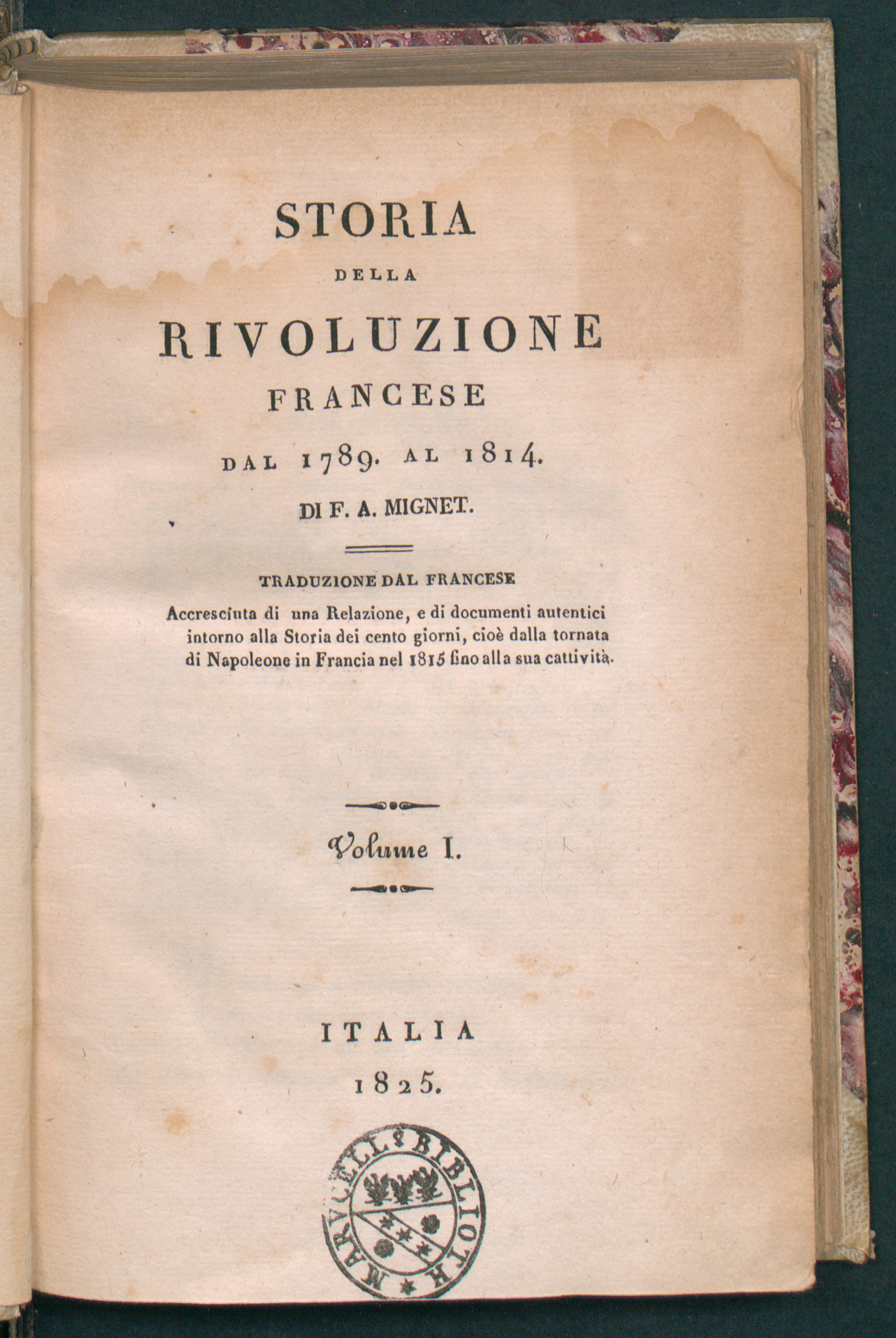
Histoire de la Révolution française depuis 1789 jusqu'en 1814, Italian translation, 1825.

He then went to Paris, where he was soon joined by his friend and compatriot Adolphe Thiers, the future president of the French Republic. He was introduced by Jacques-Antoine Manuel, formerly a member of the Convention, to the Liberal paper, Le Courrier français, where he became a member of the staff which carried on a fierce pen-and-ink warfare against the Restoration. He acquired his knowledge of the men and intrigues of the Napoleonic epoch from Talleyrand.

Mignet's Histoire de la révolution française (1824), in support of the Liberal cause, was an enlarged sketch, prepared in four months, in which more stress was laid on fundamental theories than on the facts. In 1830, he founded Le National with Thiers and Armand Carrel, and signed the journalists' protest against the July Ordinances, however, he refused to profit from his party's victory. He was satisfied with the modest position of Director of the Archives at the Foreign Office, where he stayed till the revolution of 1848, when he was dismissed, and retired permanently into private life. He had been elected a member of the Académie des sciences morales et politiques, which was re-established in 1832, and, in 1837, was made the permanent secretary. He was elected a member of the Académie française in 1836, and sought no further honours.

Mignet was well known in fashionable circles where his witty conversation and pleasant manners made him a favourite. Most of his time was devoted to study and to his academic duties. Eulogies on his deceased fellow-members, the Academy reports on its work, and on the prizes awarded by it, which it was part of Mignet's duty as secretary to draw up, were thoroughly appreciated by connoisseurs, and were collected in Mignet's Notices et portraits.

He worked slowly and lingered over research. With the exception of his description of the French Revolution, which was chiefly a political manifesto, all his early works refer to the Middle Ages. He and historian Francois Guizot invented the concept of the bourgeois revolution. These include, De la féodalité, des institutions de Saint Louis et de l'influence de la législation de ce prince (1822); La Germanie au VIIIe et au IXe siècle, sa conversion au Christianisme, et son introduction dans la société civilisée de l'Europe occidentale (1834); Essai sur la formation territoriale et politique de la France depuis la fin du XIe siècle jusqu'à la fin du XVe (1836); all of which are rough sketches that mainly outline the subjects.

Mignet's most famous works are devoted to modern history. For many years, he immersed himself into history of the Reformation, but only one part of his writings, dealing with the Reformation at Geneva, was published. His Histoire de Marie Stuart (2 vols., 1851) made use of previously unpublished documents from the archives of Simancas. He devoted several volumes to a history of Spain, which had a well-deserved success, including, Charles Quint, son abdication, son séjour et sa mort au monastère de Yuste (1845); Antonio Perez et Philippe II. (1845); and Histoire de la rivalité de François Ier et de Charles Quint (1875).

At the same time, he was commissioned to publish the diplomatic acts relating to the War of the Spanish Succession for the Collection des documents inédits. Only four volumes of these Négotiations were published (1835–1842), and they do not go further than the Peace of Nijmegen; however, the introduction is celebrated, and Mignet reprinted it in his Mélanges historiques.

Mignet was elected a Foreign Honorary Member of the American Academy of Arts and Sciences in 1876.

=== Death and commemoration ===
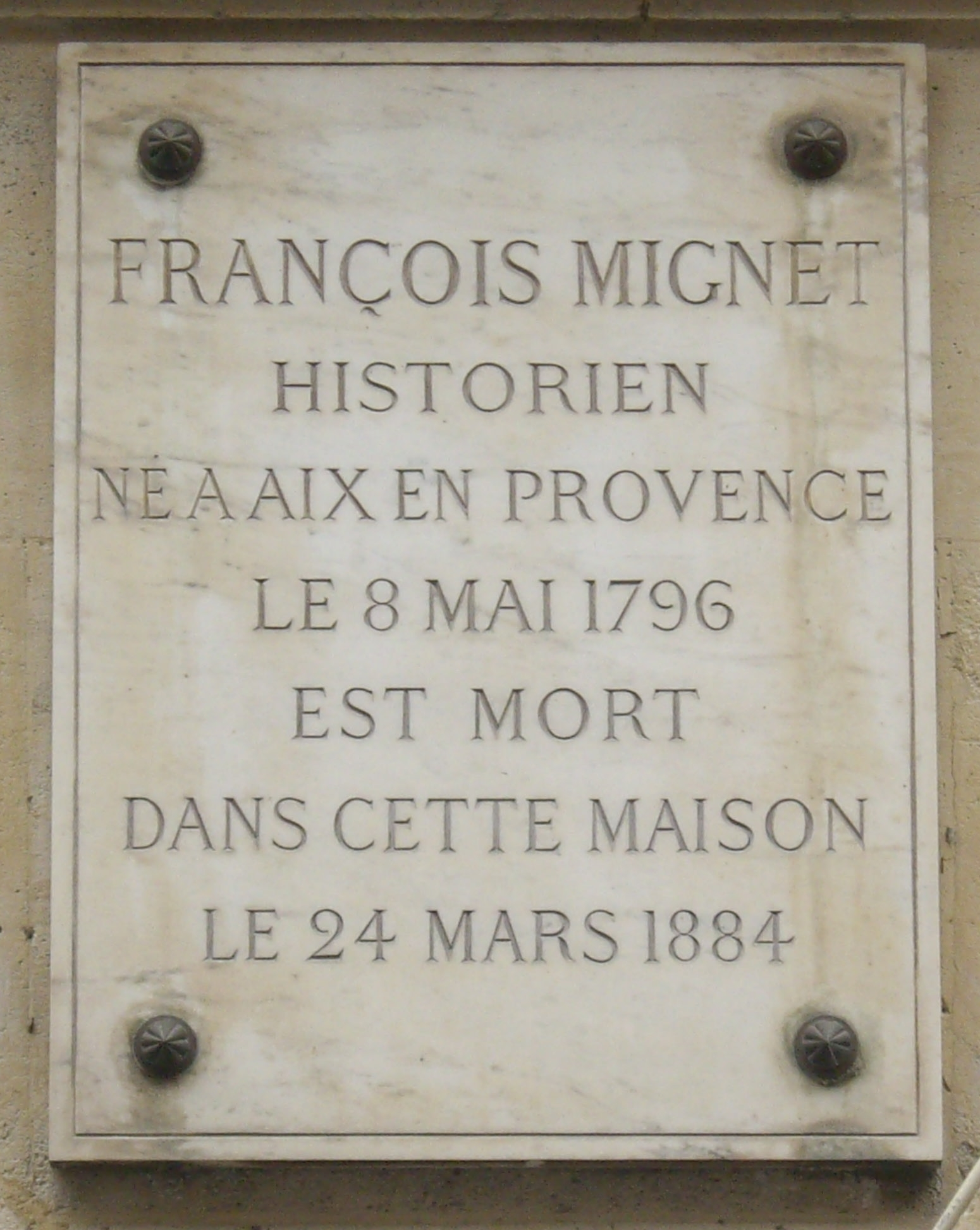
Plaque on 12 Rue d’Aumale (Paris, 9th)

Mignet died in Paris in 1884 at age 87. A eulogy was delivered by Victor Duruy on entering the Académie Française on 18 June 1885.

In his birth city of Aix-en-Provence, the street Rue Mignet is named after him, as is Collège Mignet, a school. In Paris, Rue Mignet (16th arrondissement) is named after him, and there is a plaque on 12 Rue d’Aumale (9th) where he died.
