= Entry of Joan of Arc into liberated Orléans on 8th May 1429 =

Painting by Hendrik Scheffer

- Entrée de Jeanne d'Arc à Orléans, 8 mai 1429 (French)
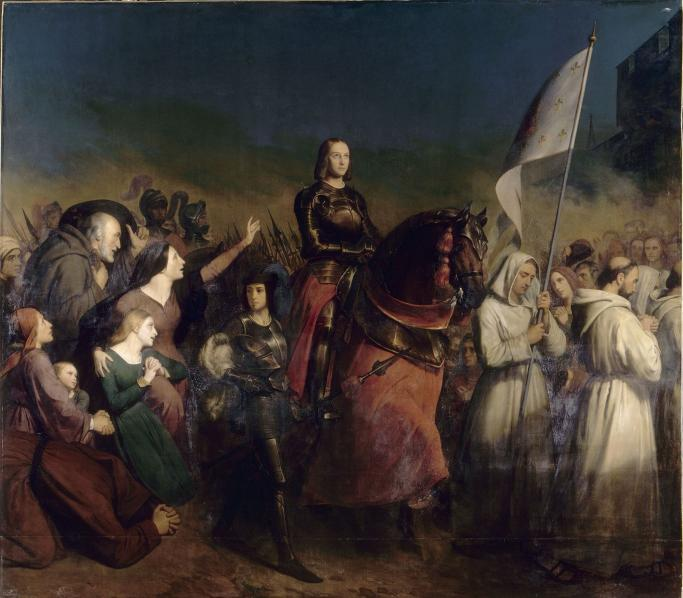
- Artist: Hendrik Scheffer
- Year: 1843
- Catalogue: MV 2691
- Medium: Oil on canvas
- Subject: Joan of Arc
- Dimensions: 425 cm × 483 cm (167 in × 190 in)
- Location: Galerie des Batailles, Palace of Versailles, Versailles

Entry of Joan of Arc into liberated Orléans on 8th May 1429 (French: Entrée de Jeanne d'Arc à Orléans, 8 mai 1429) is a painting by the Dutch-born French artist Hendrik Scheffer, completed in 1843. It is one of the works on display in the Galerie des Batailles at the Palace of Versailles in France.

== Description ==
The painting is an oil on canvas measuring 4.25 m × 4.83 m. It depicts a moment from the lifting of the Siege of Orléans in 1429 during the Hundred Years' War.

== Location ==
The work hangs in the Galerie des Batailles at Versailles. Because the gallery’s canvases are arranged chronologically, it is placed between those illustrating the Battle of Cocherel (1364) and the Battle of Castillon (1453).

== History ==
In 1833, Louis Philippe I, who had been on the throne for three years, decided to convert the Palace of Versailles into a museum of French history. The Galerie des Batailles was inaugurated in 1837. Thirty-three monumental canvases were installed to portray major military episodes in French history.

Henry Scheffer painted the canvas in 1843, and it was shown at the Paris Salon that same year.

== See also ==
- Galerie des Batailles
- Cultural depictions of Joan of Arc
