= Armand Carrel =

French writer (1800–1836)

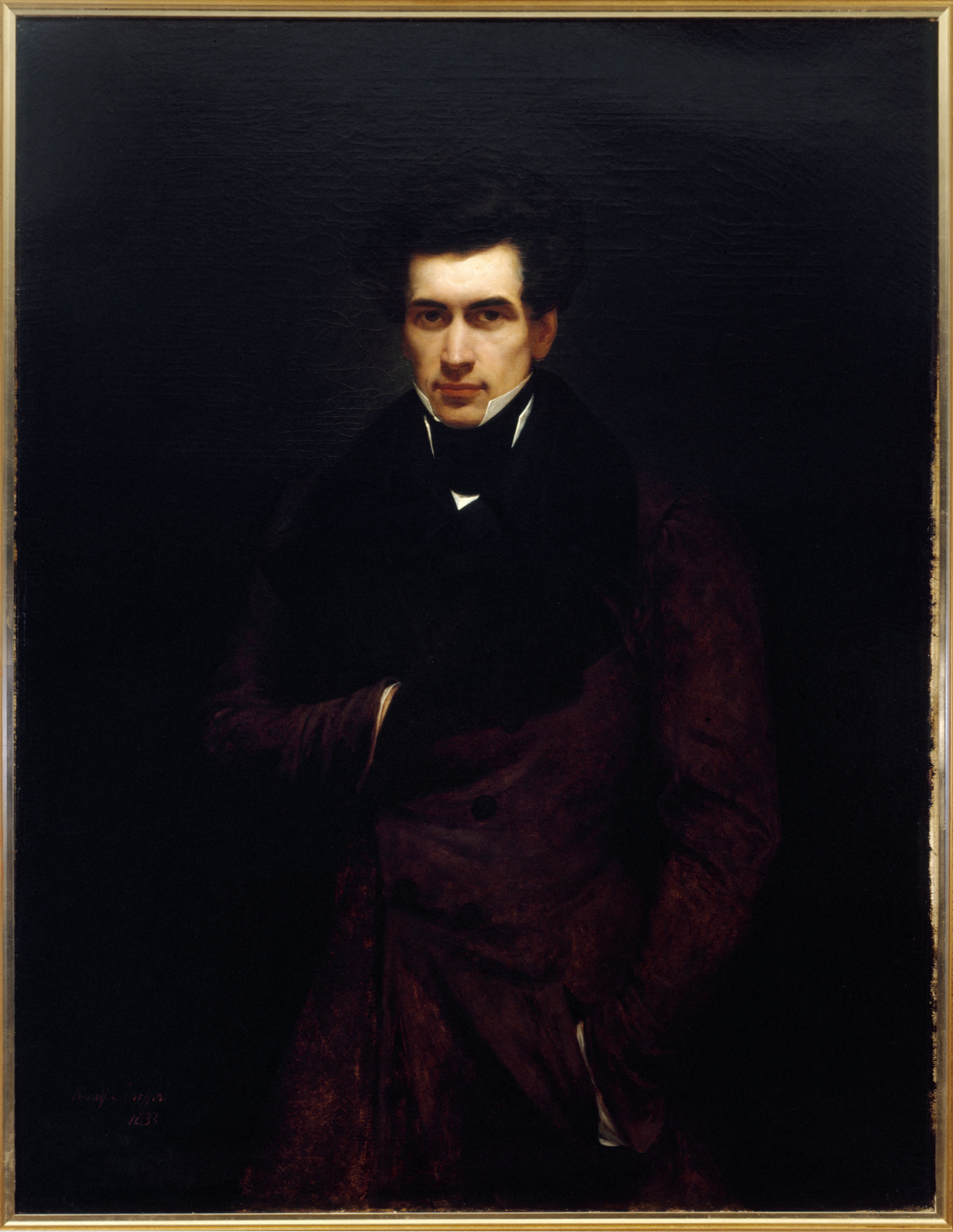
- Portrait of Armand Carrel by Hendrik Scheffer (Paris, Musée de la Vie romantique)
- Born: 8 May 1800; Rouen
- Died: 8 June 1836 (aged 36); Paris
- Cause of death: Duel
- Occupations: Journalist, Editor

Jean-Baptiste Nicolas Armand Carrel (8 May 1800 – 25 July 1836) was a French journalist and political writer.

== Early life ==
He was born at Rouen. His father was a wealthy merchant, and he received a liberal education at the Lycée Pierre Corneille in Rouen, afterwards attending the military school at St Cyr. He had a deep admiration for the great generals of Napoleon, and his uncompromising spirit and independent views marked him as a leader. Entering the army as sub-lieutenant, he took a secret but active part in the unsuccessful Belfort Conspiracy. At the outbreak of war with Spain in 1823, Carrel, whose sympathies were with the liberal cause, resigned, and succeeded in escaping to Barcelona. He enrolled in the foreign legion and fought gallantly against his former comrades. The legion was compelled to surrender near Figueres, and Carrel was taken prisoner by his former general, Damas. There was considerable difficulty about the terms of his capitulation, and one council of war condemned Carrel to death. The sentence was not carried out, and he was soon acquitted and freed.

== Career in journalism ==
His career as a soldier being finally over, Carrel decided to devote himself to literature. He went to Paris and began as secretary to the historian Augustin Thierry. His services were found to be of great value, and he obtained admirable training as a writer, and led himself to investigate interesting events of British history. His first work of importance (he had already written some historical abstracts) was the History of the Counter-Revolution in England, a political study of the events that culminated in the "Glorious Revolution".

Carrel gradually became known as a journalist for various periodicals. However, it was not until he began working with Le National, a daily founded in 1830, that he became a journalism magnate in France. At first, Le National was a collaborative effort by Adolphe Thiers, François Mignet, Auguste Sautelet, and Carrel, but after the July Revolution of 1830, Thiers and Mignet assumed office, and the entire management of the publication was left in Carrel's hands. Under his direction the journal grew to become the foremost political organ in Paris.

As a defender of democracy, Carrel faced serious dangers. Once, after a confrontation with the Chamber of Peers acting as a High Court, he was sent to Sainte-Pélagie Prison, and he appeared several times before the Tribunal of Paris to answer for his journal. In July 1835, he was one of a number of newspaper editors and writers arrested in the aftermath of Giuseppe Marco Fieschi's attempted assassination of King Louis Philippe I.

== Death ==
Carrel had previously fought two duels with editors of rival papers. The third dispute, which led to his duel with Émile de Girardin was minor, and might have been amicably settled had it not been for Carrel's own obstinacy. The meeting took place on the morning of 22 July 1836 in the Paris suburb of Saint-Mandé. De Girardin was wounded in the thigh, Carrel in the groin. The wound immediately appeared to be dangerous, and Carrel was carried to the house of a friend where he died two days later, at age 36.

== Legacy ==
Carrel's works were published in five volumes with biographical notes by Émile Littré, (Paris, 1858).

In the 19th arrondissement of Paris, the Place Armand-Carrel (in French) and the Rue Armand-Carrel (in French) are named after him. The former was named in an 1879 decree.
