= 1323–1328 Flemish revolt =

Medieval proxy revolt against the King of France

Peasant revolt in Flanders 1323–1328
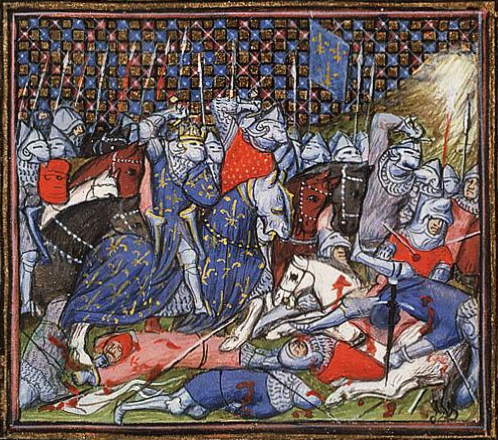
- 1410 miniature of the Battle of Cassel
Date	1323 – 1328
Location	County of Flanders
Result	French victory

Belligerents
Kingdom of France; Flemish count and loyalists	Flemish rebels

Commanders and leaders
Charles IV of France; Louis I of Flanders	Nicolaas Zannekin †; William Deken (executed)

The Flemish peasant revolt of 1323–1328, sometimes referred to as the Flemish Coast uprising (Dutch: Opstand van Kust-Vlaanderen, French: soulèvement de la Flandre maritime) in historical writing, was a popular revolt in late medieval Europe. Beginning as a series of scattered rural riots in late 1323, peasant insurrection escalated into a full-scale rebellion that dominated public affairs in Flanders for nearly five years until 1328. The revolt in Flanders was caused by many of the working class being heavily taxed by the Count of Flanders Louis I and by his pro-French policies. The insurrection had urban leaders and rural factions, which took over most of Flanders by 1325.

The revolt was led by Nicolaas Zannekin, a rich farmer from Lampernisse. Zannekin and his men captured the towns of Nieuwpoort, Veurne, Ypres and Kortrijk. In Kortrijk, Zannekin captured the count himself. In 1325, attempts to capture Ghent and Oudenaarde failed. The King of France, Charles IV, intervened. Louis was released from captivity in February 1326, and the Peace of Arques was sealed. The peace soon failed, and the count fled to France when more hostilities erupted. Louis convinced his new liege Philip VI of France to come to his aid, and Zannekin and his adherents were decisively defeated by the French royal army at the Battle of Cassel.

== From peasant uprising against taxes to full-scale rebellion ==
In September 1322, the old Count Robert III died. Because Robert's son and heir, Louis I, had died two months earlier, the count was succeeded by his grandson Louis. Louis thus, within a time span of two months, inherited the Counties of Nevers and Flanders from his father and grandfather and, in the name of his mother, held real power in Rethel, which he would also formally inherit in 1328, which made him one of the most powerful lords in France. In 1320, Louis married Margaret of France, the second daughter of King Philip V of France and Joan II, Countess of Burgundy. The marriage alliance and Louis's own French upbringing made him break with the anti-French policy of his grandfather Robert III and his great-grandfather Guy I. Instead, Louis started a pro-French and anti-English policy. The policies were detrimental to the economies of the Flemish cities by raising taxes in order to pay the financial consequences from the Treaty of Athis-sur-Orge.

The rebellion began with a series of scattered rural riots in November and December 1323, caused by the poor harvests of 1323, a difficult lien, refusal to pay tithes and taxes to the Count and hatred toward the nobility and authority due to growing tensions among the common people. Before the revolt, between 1315 and 1317, Flanders had experienced harsher weathers than was typical for the area leading to less crop production in those years. The farmers had to continue to pay their taxes to the elites, causing them to struggle for the next few year to recoup from the losses. The revolt was led by landowning farmers such as Jacques Peyte and Nicolaas Zannekin. Members of the local gentry joined, and the mayor of Bruges, Willem de Deken, became the leader of the revolt.

Zannekin fled to Bruges, where the revolt continued to spread across the region. Zannekin won the neighbouring towns of Roeselare, Poperinge, Nieuwpoort, Veurne, Dunkirk, Cassel and Bailleul for his cause as they opened their gates to him. The new Count of Flanders, Louis de Nevers, arrived in Flanders in January 1324 but had no army to contain the revolt, which caused him to negotiate with the rebels. In April 1324, the Peace of St. Andrew was made, recognizing the merits of the complaints of the people against the exactions of the collectors.

== Revolt against power of Count ==
The agitation continued after the murder of a labourer by a knight and the arrest of six burghers of Bruges by the Count in Kortrijk. The men from Bruges took up arms, and the Count was captured by the inhabitants in Kortrijk. He was brought to Bruges, where several of his companions were executed on June 21, 1325. The men from Bruges elected Robert of Cassel, a younger son of Robert III of Flanders and thus the uncle of the Count of Flanders, as their regent of Flanders ("Ruwaard") to lead them in an expedition against Ghent (July 15, 1325) during which they laid siege to the city. The rebels' numbers were strengthened when inhabitants from Ypres and Ghent, who had been driven out of their cities, joined them.

King Charles IV of France sent ambassadors to Flanders. They proposed to submit the grievances of the commons against the count to his royal arbitration. As a prerequisite to any negotiations, the rebels demanded the submission of Ghent. In vain, the King summoned Robert of Cassel to Paris (September 19, 1325) and named Jean de Namur as "Ruwaard of Flanders". On November 4, the Bishop of Senlis and the Abbot of St. Denis excommunicated the Flemish rebels at the King's request, and the King also threatened to intervene militarily. After the excommunication, Robert of Cassel broke ties with the rebels and joined the King's side.

Count Louis of Nevers was released before Christmas, and on February 18, 1326, he forgave Bruges and swore to respect the customs and liberties of the communes of Flanders. From there, he went to the King in Paris. A provisional peace treaty was finally concluded by the ambassadors of the King (The Peace of Arques) and ratified at the Val Merrick, near Corbeil on April 19, 1326. On April 26, the ban on Flanders was lifted.

== Repression by Philip VI of France ==
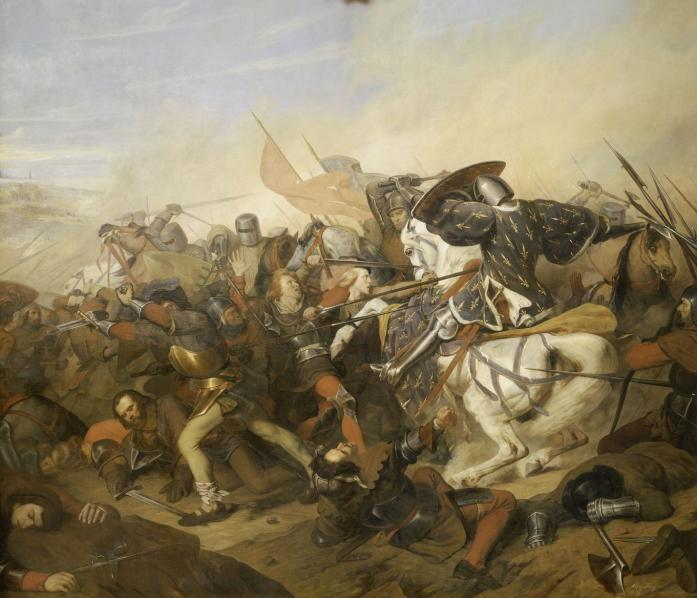
1837 Romantic painting of the Battle of Cassel. The Battle of Cassel by Hendrik Scheffer, 1837

After the death of Charles IV, the revolt of the Flemish municipalities erupted again in February 1328. Louis de Nevers then called upon the new king, Philip VI, at his coronation at Reims on May 29 to aid the count against the burghers. Philip agreed to organize an expedition, and the royal army was summoned to gather at Arras on July 22. The rebels raised enough men to fight the enemy in the open countryside, and the rebel forces met the royal army at the Battle of Cassel in which they were defeated, and Zannekin was killed.

After his victory, the King returned to France and took hostages for good behaviour among the burghers of Bruges and Ypres. The mayor of Bruges, Willem de Deken, was extradited to France and executed in Paris.

The Count of Flanders was left responsible for punishment of the conspirators. The cities of Bruges, Ypres, Kortrijk, Diksmuide, Veurne, Ostend, Aardenburg, Ysendyke, Dendermonde and Geraardsbergen were sentenced to pay heavy fines. The properties of those who participated in the Battle of Cassel were confiscated and distributed to the faithful adherents of the count. The privileges of all cities except Ghent were cancelled or restricted. In Bruges, the burghers were forced to meet the count at the castle of Male and throw themselves on their knees, imploring his mercy. In Ypres, the bell in the belfry was broken. Finally, by letters dated December 20, 1328, the King of France ordered for the fortifications of Bruges, Ypres, and Kortrijk to be destroyed.

== Aftermath ==
When the Hundred Years' War started, Louis remained steadfast in his pro-French policy despite the county's economic dependence on England. His actions resulted in an English boycott of the wool trade, which in turn sparked a new insurrection under Jacob van Artevelde. In 1339, the count fled his Flemish lands, never to return. Louis was killed at the Battle of Crécy in 1346.

== Historiography ==
The French court historian Jean Froissart wrote about the Battle of Cassel in his book Chronicles, where he claims the French won by the grace of God. The Belgian historian Henri Pirenne published the first major historical study of the rebellion in 1900, Le soulèvement de la Flandre maritime de 1323-1328 ("The Revolt of Maritime Flanders of 1323–1328"). The American historian William H. TeBrake published a 1993 book, A Plague of Insurrection: Popular Politics and Peasant Revolt in Flanders, 1323-1328 in 1993.

== Sources ==
- TeBrake, William H. (1993). A Plague of Insurrection: Popular Politics and Peasant Revolt in Flanders, 1323-1328. Philadelphia: University of Pennsylvania Press. ISBN 0-8122-3241-0.
- SABBE, Jacques. "Vlaanderen in opstand 1323-1328", Uitg. Marc van de Wiele, Brugge 1992.
- VAN BELLE, Juliaan. "Een andere Leeuw van Vlaanderen", Uitg. Flandria Nostra, Torhout 1985.
- LEGLAY, Edward. "Histoire des comtes de Flandre", Librairie de A. Vandale, Brussel 1843.
