= The Battle of Cassel =

Painting by Hendrik Scheffer

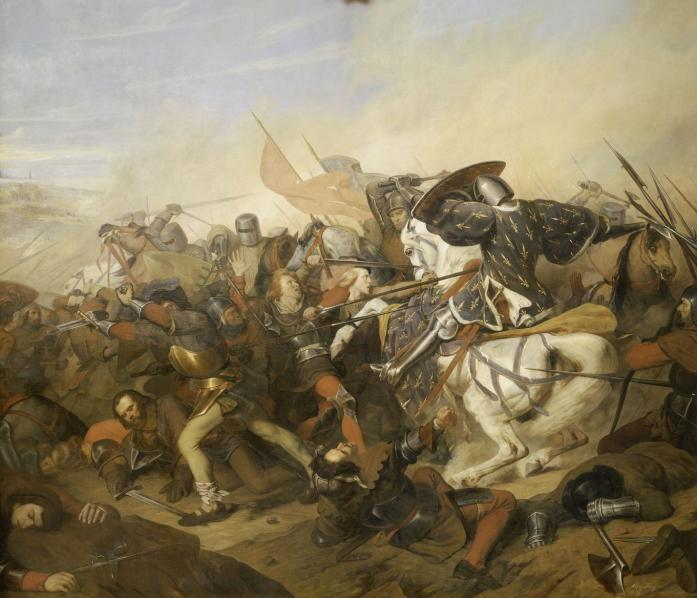
- Artist: Hendrik Scheffer
- Year: 1837
- Medium: Oil on canvas
- Dimensions: 465 cm × 543 cm (183 in × 214 in)
- Location: Palace of Versailles, Versailles

The Battle of Cassel (French: Bataille de Cassel) is an 1837 history painting by the Dutch artist Hendrik Scheffer. It depicts the Battle of Cassel fought on 23 August 1328. Part of the Flemish Revolt, it ended in a decisive victory for the French under Philip VI the first king of the Valois Dynasty. Fought near Cassel in Flanders it led to the death of the rebel commander Nicolaas Zannekin the scene the painting portrays.

Scheffer was part of the Romantic movement, then at its height. The painting was commissioned in 1835 at the cost of 12,000 Francs by Louis Philippe I for the new Musée de l'Histoire de France at the Palace of Versailles. It was displayed at the Salon of 1837, held at the Louvre in Paris. Today the painting is in the Galerie des Batailles at Versailles.

== Bibliography ==
- Gervereau, Laurent. La guerre sans dentelles. Skira-Flammarion, 2009.
- Trapp, Frank. The Attainment of Delacroix. Johns Hopkins Press, 1970.
