= Philip VI of France =

Disputed King of France from 1328 to 1350

Philip VI
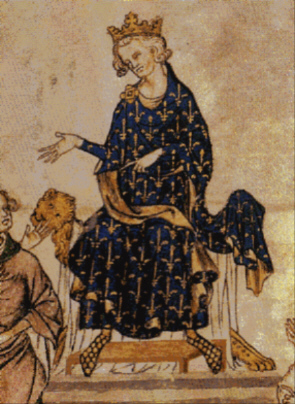
- Philip VI in a contemporary miniature depicting the trial of Robert III of Artois, c. 1336

King of France
- Reign: 1 February 1328 – 22 August 1350
- Coronation: 29 May 1328
- Predecessor: Charles IV
- Successor: John II
- Regent: Queen Joan (1340, 1345–1346, 1347)
- Born: 1293; Fontainebleau, Paris, France
- Died: 22 August 1350 (aged 56 or 57); Coulombes Abbey, Nogent-le-Roi, Eure-et-Loir, France
- Burial: Saint Denis Basilica, Saint-Denis, Paris
- Spouses: Joan of Burgundy (m. 1313; died 1349) Blanche of Navarre (m. 1350)
- Issue among others: John II of France; Philip, Duke of Orléans; Joan of France
- House: Valois
- Father: Charles, Count of Valois
- Mother: Margaret, Countess of Anjou

Philip VI (French: Philippe; 1293 – 22 August 1350), called the Fortunate (French: le Fortuné), the Catholic (le Catholique) and of Valois (de Valois), was the first king of France from the House of Valois, reigning from 1328 until his death in 1350. Philip's reign was dominated by the consequences of a succession dispute. When King Charles IV of France died in 1328, his nearest male relative was his sororal nephew, Edward III of England, but the French nobility preferred Charles's paternal cousin, Philip of Valois.

At first, Edward seemed to accept Philip's succession, but he pressed his claim to the throne of France after a series of disagreements with Philip. The result was the beginning of the Hundred Years' War in 1337.

After initial successes at sea, Philip's navy was annihilated at the Battle of Sluys in 1340, ensuring that the war would occur on the continent. The English took another decisive advantage at the Battle of Crécy (1346), while the Black Death struck France, further destabilising the country.

In 1349, Philip bought the Dauphiné of Viennois, a county in the Kingdom of Burgundy (Arles), under the suzerainty of the Holy Roman Empire, thus expanding the French influence beyond the river Rhône. The acquisition was formalized by the treaty of Romans, concluded between Philip and Humbert II, Dauphin of Viennois. The province was entrusted to Philip's grandson, prince Charles (the future king Charles V).

Philip VI died in 1350 and was succeeded by his son John II.

== Early life ==
Little is recorded about Philip's childhood and youth, in large part because he was of minor royal birth. Philip's father, Charles, Count of Valois, was the younger brother of King Philip IV of France. Charles had striven throughout his life to gain the throne for himself but was never successful. He died in 1325, leaving his eldest son Philip as heir to the counties of Anjou, Maine, and Valois.

== Accession to the throne ==
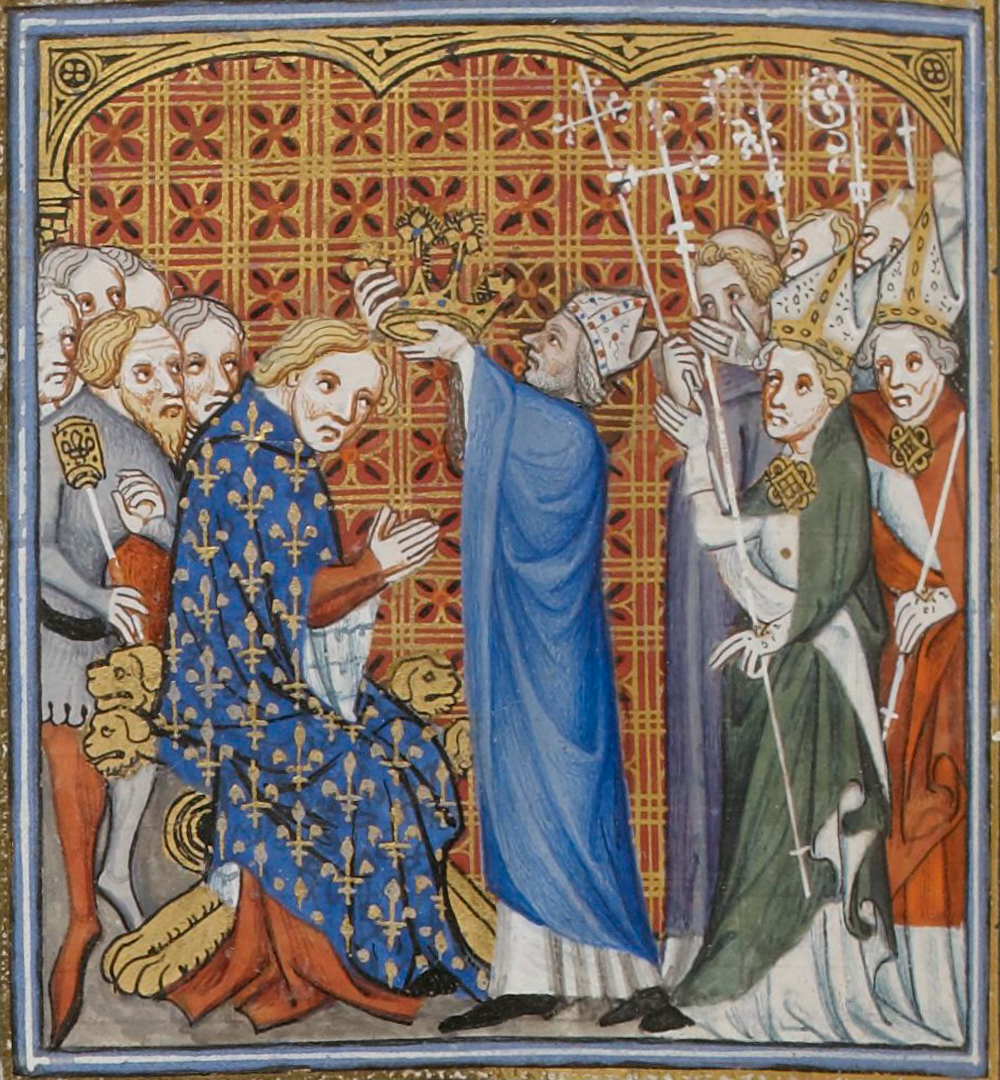
Coronation of Philip VI

In 1328, Philip's cousin Charles IV of France died without a son, leaving his widow Joan of Évreux pregnant. Philip was one of the two chief claimants to the throne of France. The other was King Edward III of England, who was Charles's nephew and closest male relative, being the son of Charles's sister Isabella of France. The Estates General had decided 12 years earlier that women could not inherit the throne of France. The question arose as to whether Isabella should have been able to transmit a claim that she herself did not possess. The assemblies of the French barons and prelates and the University of Paris decided that males who derive their right to inheritance through their mother should be excluded according to Salic law. As Philip was the eldest grandson of Philip III of France through the male line, he became regent instead of Edward, who was a maternal grandson of Philip IV and great-grandson of Philip III.

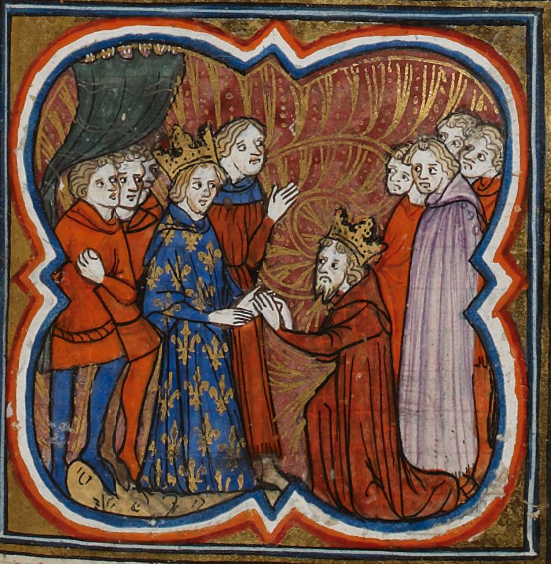
Edward III of England pays homage to Philip VI of France in Amiens, from a 1370–75 manuscript of the Grandes Chroniques de France

During the period in which Queen Joan was waiting to deliver her child, Philip of Valois rose to the regency with support of the French magnates, following the pattern set up by his cousin, Philip V of France, who succeeded to the throne over his niece Joan. Philip formally held the regency from 9 February until 1 April 1328. On 1 April, Joan of Évreux gave birth to a daughter named Blanche, following which Philip was proclaimed king. He was crowned at the Cathedral in Reims on 29 May 1328. After his elevation to the throne, Philip sent the Abbot of Fécamp, Pierre Roger, to summon Edward III of England to pay homage for the duchy of Aquitaine and Gascony. After a subsequent second summons from Philip, Edward finally arrived at the Cathedral of Amiens on 6 June 1329 and worded his vows in such a way to cause more disputes in later years.

The dynastic change had another consequence: Charles IV had also been King of Navarre, but, unlike the crown of France, the crown of Navarre was not subject to Salic law. Philip VI was neither an heir nor a descendant of Joan I of Navarre, whose inheritance (the kingdom of Navarre, as well as the counties of Champagne, Troyes, Meaux, and Brie) had been in personal union with the crown of France for almost fifty years and had long been administered by the same royal machinery established by King Philip IV, the father of French bureaucracy. These counties were closely entrenched in the economic and administrative entity of the crown lands of France, being located adjacent to Île-de-France. Philip, however, was not entitled to that inheritance; the rightful heiress was the surviving daughter of his cousin King Louis X, the future Joan II of Navarre, the heir general of Joan I of Navarre. Navarre thus passed to Joan II, with whom Philip struck a deal regarding the counties in Champagne: she received vast lands in Normandy (adjacent to the fief in Évreux that her husband Philip III of Navarre owned) as compensation, and he kept Champagne as part of the French crown lands.

== Reign ==
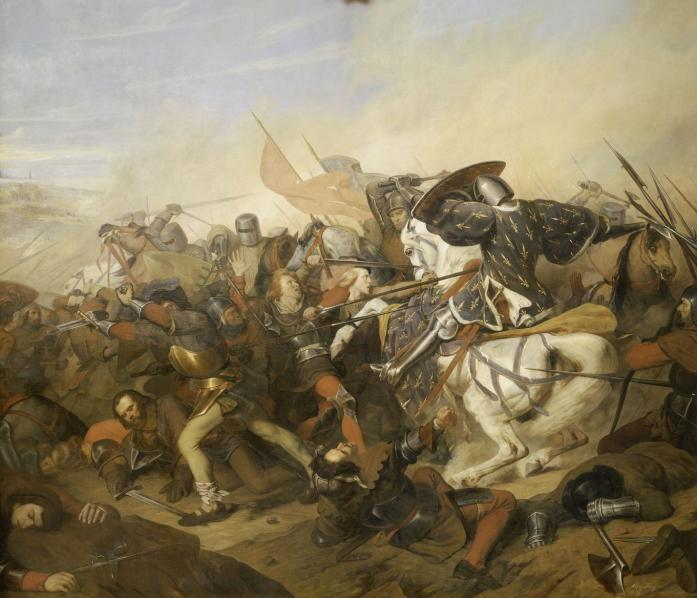
The Battle of Cassel by Hendrik Scheffer, 1837

Philip's reign was plagued with crises, although it began with a military success in Flanders at the Battle of Cassel (August 1328), where Philip's forces re-seated Louis I, Count of Flanders, who had been unseated by a popular revolution. Philip's wife, the able Joan the Lame, gave the first of many demonstrations of her competence as regent in his absence.

Philip initially enjoyed relatively amicable relations with Edward III, and they planned a crusade together in 1332, which was never executed. However, the status of the Duchy of Aquitaine remained a sore point, and tension increased. Philip provided refuge for David II of Scotland in 1334 and declared himself champion of his interests, which enraged Edward. By 1336, they were enemies, although not yet openly at war.

During the preliminary period before the war with England, Philip VI joined a naval league with Venice, the Pope, the Hospitaler Knights and the Kingdom of Cyprus. Originally, Edward III was to join in a bid to dissuade war between the two kingdoms, although the King of England ultimately did not participate. Philip VI kept his promise, and the allied fleet assembled in May 1334 at the Negroponte. The crusade engaged in a series of raids against the Turkish coast and scored a victory at the battle of Adramytion in September, defeating a large Turkish fleet. Plans were made to launch another crusade, larger than the last, in the following years. Although rising tensions with England forced Philip VI to move his naval power to the Channel.

Philip successfully prevented an arrangement between the Avignon papacy and Holy Roman Emperor Louis IV, although in July 1337, Louis concluded an alliance with Edward III. The final breach with England came when Edward offered refuge to Robert III of Artois, formerly one of Philip's trusted advisers, after Robert committed forgery to try to obtain an inheritance. As relations between Philip and Edward worsened, Robert's standing in England strengthened. On 26 December 1336, Philip officially demanded the extradition of Robert to France. On 24 May 1337, Philip declared that Edward had forfeited Aquitaine for disobedience and for sheltering the "king's mortal enemy", Robert of Artois. Thus began the Hundred Years' War, complicated by Edward's renewed claim to the throne of France in retaliation for the forfeiture of Aquitaine.

=== Hundred Years' War ===
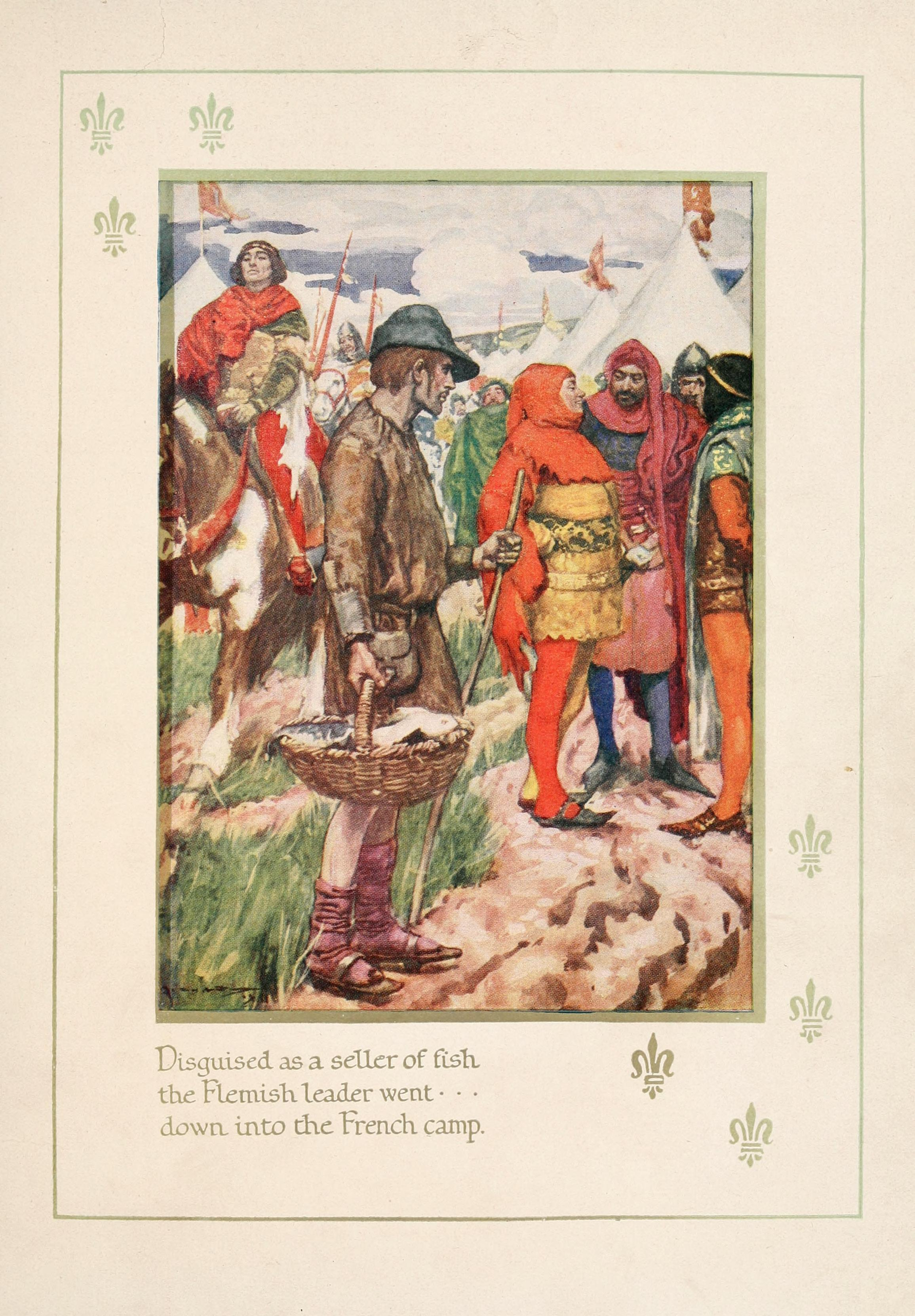
Flemish leader as fish seller went to search in French camp

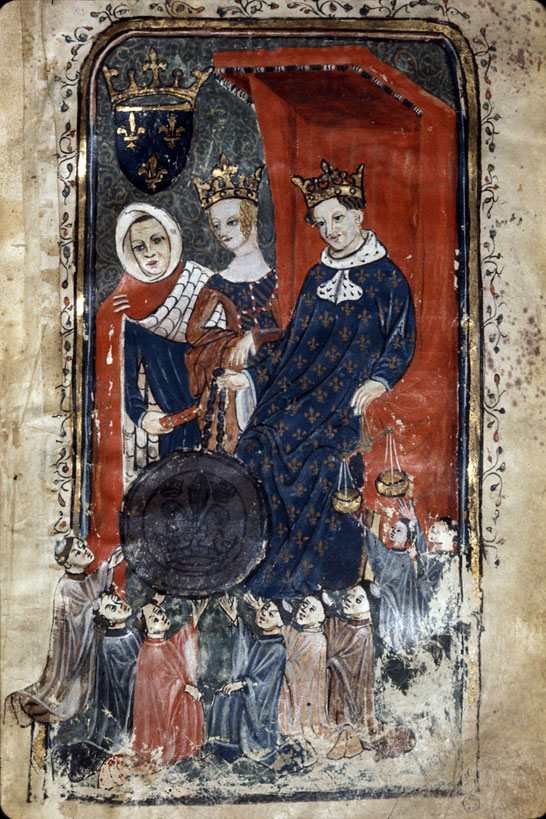
Philip VI and his first wife, Joan of Burgundy

Philip entered the Hundred Years' War in a position of comparative strength. France was richer and more populous than England and was at the height of its medieval glory. The opening stages of the war, accordingly, were largely successful for the French.

At sea, French privateers raided and burned towns and shipping all along the southern and southeastern coasts of England. The English made some retaliatory raids, including the burning of a fleet in the harbour of Boulogne-sur-Mer, but the French largely had the upper hand. With his sea power established, Philip gave orders in 1339 to begin assembling a fleet off the Zeeland coast at Sluys. In June 1340, however, in the bitterly fought Battle of Sluys, the English attacked the port and captured or destroyed the ships there, ending the threat of an invasion.

On land, Edward III largely concentrated upon Flanders and the Low Countries, where he had gained allies through diplomacy and bribery. A raid in 1339 (the first chevauchée) into Picardy ended ignominiously when Philip wisely refused to give battle. Edward's slender finances would not permit him to play a waiting game, and he was forced to withdraw into Flanders and return to England to raise more money. In July 1340, Edward returned and mounted the siege of Tournai. By September 1340, Edward was in financial distress, hardly able to pay or feed his troops, and was open to dialogue. After being at Bouvines for a week, Philip was finally persuaded to send Joan of Valois, Countess of Hainaut, to discuss terms to end the siege. On 23 September 1340, a nine-month truce was reached.

So far, the war had gone quite well for Philip and the French. While often stereotyped as chivalry-besotted and incompetent, Philip and his men had in fact carried out a successful Fabian strategy against the debt-plagued Edward and resisted the chivalric blandishments of single combat or a combat of two hundred knights that he offered. In 1341, the War of the Breton Succession allowed the English to place permanent garrisons in Brittany. However, Philip was still in a commanding position: during negotiations arbitrated by the pope in 1343, he refused Edward's offer to end the war in exchange for the Duchy of Aquitaine in full sovereignty.

The next attack came in 1345, when the Earl of Derby overran the Agenais (lost twenty years before in the War of Saint-Sardos) and took Angoulême, while the forces in Brittany under Sir Thomas Dagworth also made gains. The French responded in the spring of 1346 with a massive counterattack against Aquitaine, where an army under John, Duke of Normandy, besieged Derby at Aiguillon. On the advice of Godfrey Harcourt (like Robert III of Artois, a banished French nobleman), Edward sailed for Normandy instead of Aquitaine. As Harcourt predicted, the Normans were ill-prepared for war, and many of the fighting men were at Aiguillon. Edward sacked and burned the country as he went, taking Caen and advancing as far as Poissy and then retreating before the army Philip had hastily assembled at Paris. Slipping across the Somme, Edward drew up to give battle at Crécy.

Close behind him, Philip had planned to halt for the night and reconnoitre the English position before giving battle the next day. However, his troops were disorderly, and the roads were jammed by the rear of the army coming up and the local peasantry, which furiously called for vengeance on the English. Finding them hopeless to control, he ordered a general attack as evening fell. Thus began the Battle of Crécy. When it was done, the French army had been annihilated, and a wounded Philip barely escaped capture. Fortune had turned against the French.

The English seized and held the advantage. Normandy called off the siege of Aiguillon and retreated northward, while Sir Thomas Dagworth captured Charles of Blois in Brittany. The English army pulled back from Crécy to mount the siege of Calais; the town held out stubbornly, but the English were determined, and they easily supplied across the English Channel. Philip led out a relieving army in July 1347, but unlike the Siege of Tournai, it was now Edward who had the upper hand. With the plunder of his Norman expedition and the reforms he had executed in his tax system, he could hold to his siege lines and await an attack that Philip dared not deliver. It was Philip who marched away in August, and the city capitulated shortly thereafter.

=== Final years ===
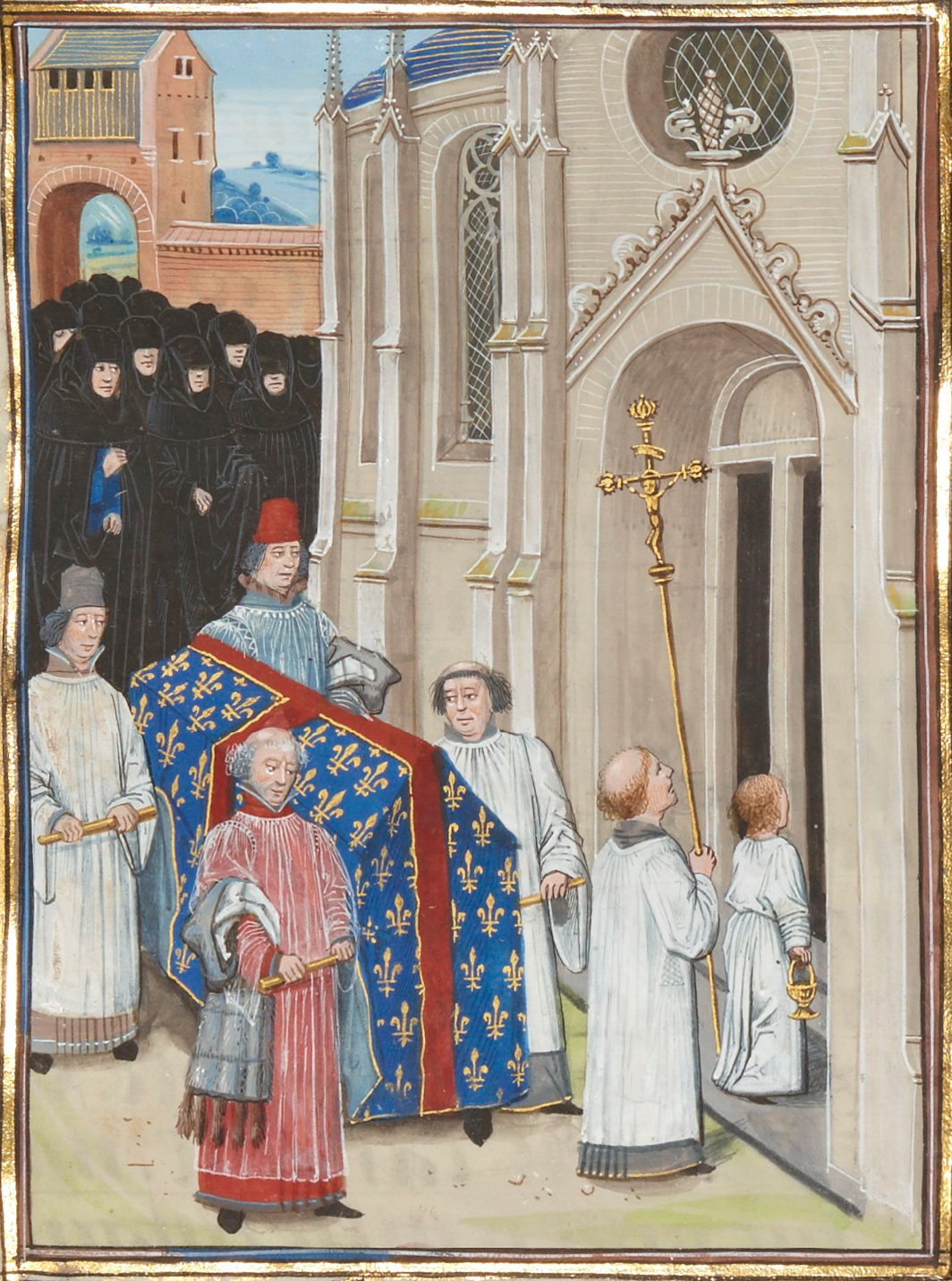
King Philip's funerary procession, which was presided over by the Archbishop of Reims, illustrated by Loyset Liédet

After the defeat at Crécy and loss of Calais, the Estates of France refused to raise money for Philip, halting his plans to counter-attack by invading England. In 1348, the Black Death struck France and in the next few years killed one-third of the population, including Queen Joan. The resulting labour shortage caused inflation to soar, and the king attempted to fix prices, further destabilising the country. His second marriage to his son's betrothed Blanche of Navarre alienated his son and many nobles from the king.

Philip's last major achievement was the acquisition of the Dauphiné and the territory of Montpellier in the Languedoc in 1349. At his death in 1350, France was very much a divided country filled with social unrest. Philip VI died at Coulombes Abbey, Eure-et-Loir, on 22 August 1350 and is interred with his first wife, Joan of Burgundy, in Saint Denis Basilica, though his viscera were buried separately at the now demolished church of Couvent des Jacobins in Paris. He was succeeded by his first son by Joan of Burgundy, who became John II.

== Marriages and children ==
Philip married twice. In July 1313, he married Joan the Lame, daughter of Duke Robert II of Burgundy, and Agnes of France, the youngest daughter of King Louis IX of France. She was thus Philip's first cousin once removed. The couple had the following children:

1. King John II of France (26 April 1319 – 8 April 1364)
2. Marie (1326 – 22 September 1333), who died aged only seven, but was already married to John, the son and heir of Duke John III of Brabant; no issue.
3. Louis (born and died 17 January 1329).
4. Louis (8 June 1330 – 23 June 1330)
5. A son [John?] (born and died 2 October 1333).
6. A son (28 May 1335), stillborn
7. Philip (1 July 1336 – 1 September 1375), Duke of Orléans
8. Joan (born and died November 1337)
9. A son (born and died summer 1343)

After Joan died in 1349, Philip married Blanche, daughter of Queen Joan II and King Philip III of Navarre, on 11 January 1350. They had one daughter:

- Joan (May 1351 – 16 September 1371), who was intended to marry John I of Aragon, but who died during the journey.

By an unknown woman, he had:

- Jean d'Armagnac (died after 1350), a knight

By his mistress, Beatrice de la Berruère, he had another son:

- Thomas de la Marche (1318–1361), bâtarde de France

== In fiction ==
Philip is a character in Les Rois maudits (The Accursed Kings), a series of French historical novels by Maurice Druon. He was portrayed by Benoît Brione in the 1972 French miniseries adaptation of the series, and by Malik Zidi in the 2005 adaptation.

== Sources ==
- Seward, Desmond (1999). The Hundred Years War. Penguin Books. ISBN 014-02-8361-7.
- "Philip VI. of France" . Encyclopædia Britannica. Vol. XVIII (9th ed.). 1885. p. 743.
- Kibler, William W.; Zinn, Grover A., eds. (2016) [1995]. Medieval France: An Encyclopedia. New York and London: Routledge. ISBN 978-1-351-66566-7.

Philip VI of France House of Valois Cadet branch of the Capetian dynasty Born: 1293 Died: 22 August 1350
Regnal titles
Vacant Title last held by Charles IV	King of France; 1328–1350	Succeeded by John II
French nobility
Preceded by Charles (III)	Count of Anjou; 1325–1328	Vacant Title next held by John II
Preceded by Charles (III)	Count of Maine; 1314–1328	Vacant Title next held by John II
Preceded by Charles (III)	Count of Valois; 1325–1328	Vacant Title next held by Philip III
