= Le National (France) =

French newspaper

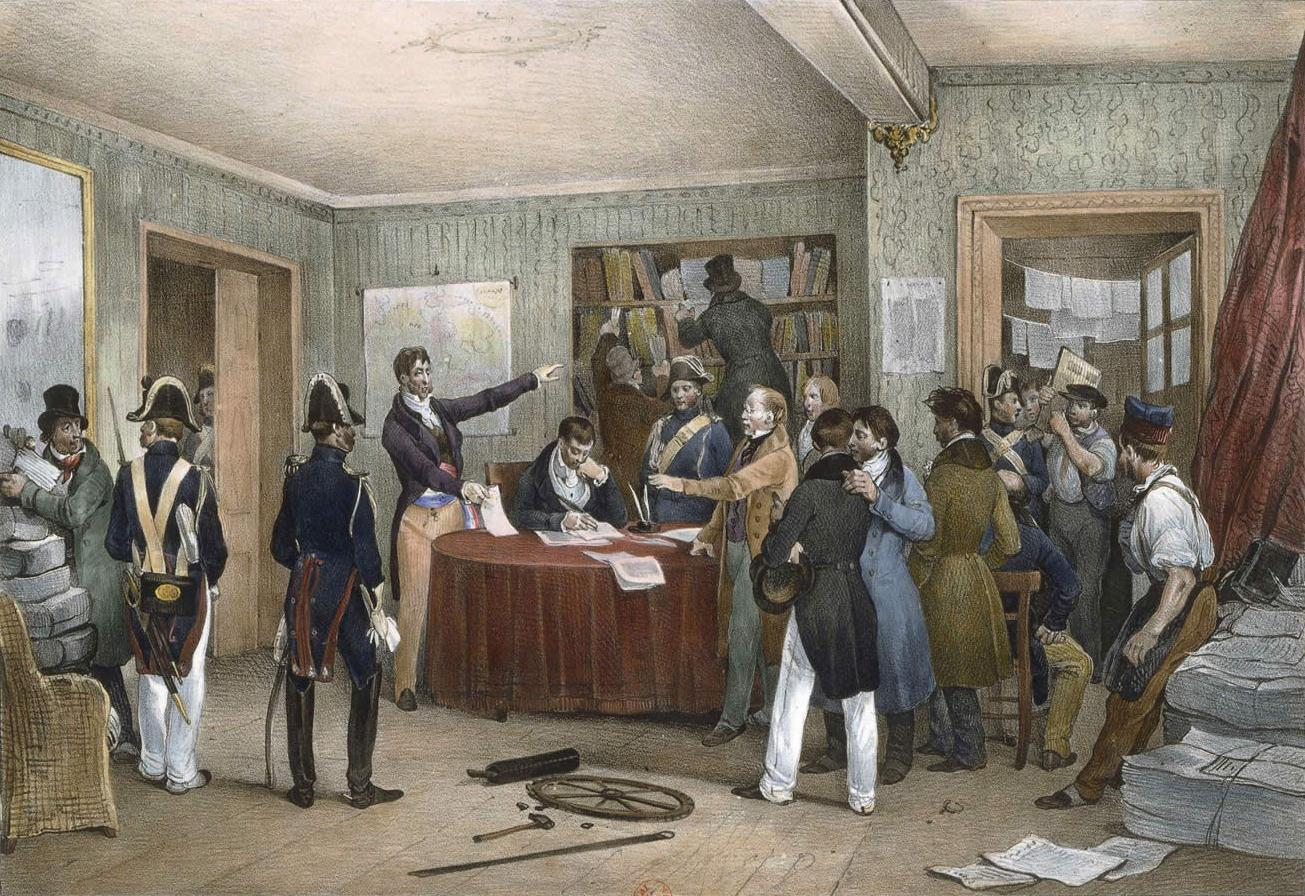
A government raid on the offices of Le National during the July Revolution, July 27, 1830

Le National was a French daily founded in 1830 by Adolphe Thiers, Armand Carrel, François-Auguste Mignet and the librarian-editor Auguste Sautelet, as the mouthpiece of the liberal opposition to the Second Restoration.

== Background ==
The first issue was published on 3 January 1830, whilst the Ultra-royalist prince de Polignac governed France in the name of Charles X. Le National was subsidised by the banker Jacques Laffitte and also supported by Talleyrand and the duc de Broglie, one of the leader of the liberal Doctrinaires group.

Its title alluded to one of the motto used in 1789 during the French Revolution, la Nation, la Loi, le Roi (Nation, Law and King). The daily advocated a constitutional monarchy and opposed Charles X's interpretation of the 1814 Charter, popularizing in particular the saying "Le roi règne mais ne gouverne pas" (The King reigns but does not rule).

Journalists gathered at the offices of Le National to sign a petition in protest against the July Ordinances restricting freedom of the press, one of the events that led to the July Revolution of 1830.

During the July Monarchy, Le National published Armand Marrast's call to Parisians to demonstrate on 22 February 1848, following the outlawing of a public meeting by the Paris prefect. Hundreds of students gathered on the place of the Panthéon, before joining workers at the Madeleine. This was the beginning of the 1848 Revolution.

During the Second Republic, Le National became the mouthpiece of the moderate Republican majority (the "bourgeois Republicans") which formed the Constituent Assembly. The new government was headed by General Louis-Eugène Cavaignac, while the moderate Republican parliamentaries were called members of the Parti du National (Party of the National) in reference to the daily.

The National then shifted toward a more Socialist position. It was outlawed following Napoleon III's 2 December 1851 coup, and disappeared on 31 December 1851. Its final editor, Ernest Caylus, fled to New York City and cofounded the French Benevolent Society of New York, which would eventually found the French Hospital in Manhattan.
