= Hendrik Scheffer =

Dutch painter

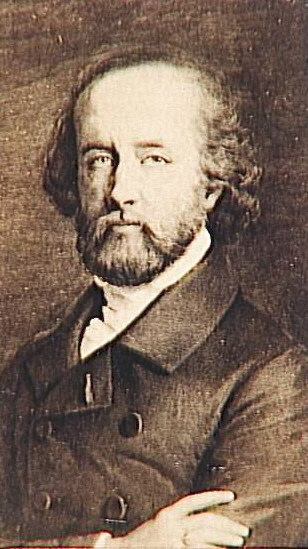
- Hendrik Scheffer (photo by Pierre Petit)
- Born: 25 September 1798; The Hague, Netherlands
- Died: 15 March 1862 (aged 63); Paris, France
- Education: Pierre-Narcisse Guérin
- Known for: Painting
- Movement: Romanticism

Hendrik Scheffer (The Hague, 25 September 1798 – Paris, 15 March 1862) was a Dutch painter in the Romantic tradition who lived in France for most of his life. In France he is usually known as Henri Scheffer.

== Personal life ==
Scheffer was the younger brother of painter Ary Scheffer, son of Johann Baptist and Cornelia Scheffer and grandson of Arie Lamme. When his father died in 1809, his mother first moved to Brussels and in 1811 to Paris.

His daughter Cornélie married French philosopher Ernest Renan. Their son Ary Renan also became a painter.

== Work ==
Scheffers, like his brother Ary, was a pupil of Pierre-Narcisse Guérin.

His work was much sought after in his lifetime. He mainly painted genre pieces and portraits which were finely crafted. His work was exhibited at the Salon from the Salon of 1824 onwards and was heavily criticised by Charles Baudelaire and Théophile Gautier.

Scheffers best known work is probably a picture portraying the arrest of Charlotte Corday (now in the Musée Lambinet), some selected others:

- Louis-Joseph de Vendôme (now in the musée de Vendôme)
- François Arago, the basis for the well known engraving by Alexandre Vincent Sixdeniers
- Armand Carrel
- Casimir Delavigne (now in musée national du château et des Trianons, in the Palace of Versailles)
- Ernest Renan (now in the Musée de la Vie Romantique)
- Augustin Thierry

Selected other works:

- An Inundation in Rome
- Joan of Arc entering Orléans (now in Versailles)
- Hermann and Dorothea
- Madame Roland
- Preaching after the Revocation of the Edict of Nantes
- The Battle of Cassel (now in Versailles)
- The dream of Charles IX in the night of St. Bartholomew, based on the St. Bartholomew's Day massacre

His work has been copied many times in engravings.

The Dordrechts Museum has a section dedicated to the work of the Scheffers (mainly his brother Ary).

== Students ==
Pierre Puvis de Chavannes studied with him for a time.

== Awards ==
He was made a Chevalier in the Legion of Honor on 8 August 1837.

== Gallery ==
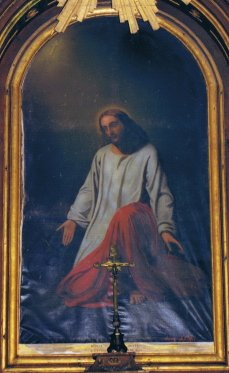
Christ on the Mount of Olives in the church of Chalifert

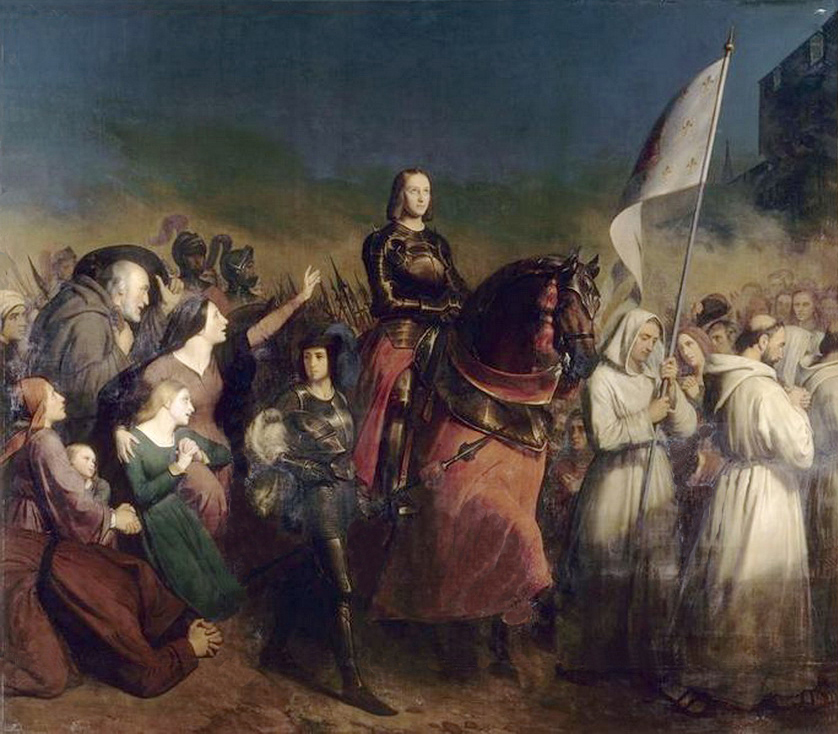
Entry of Joan of Arc into liberated Orléans on 8th May 1429

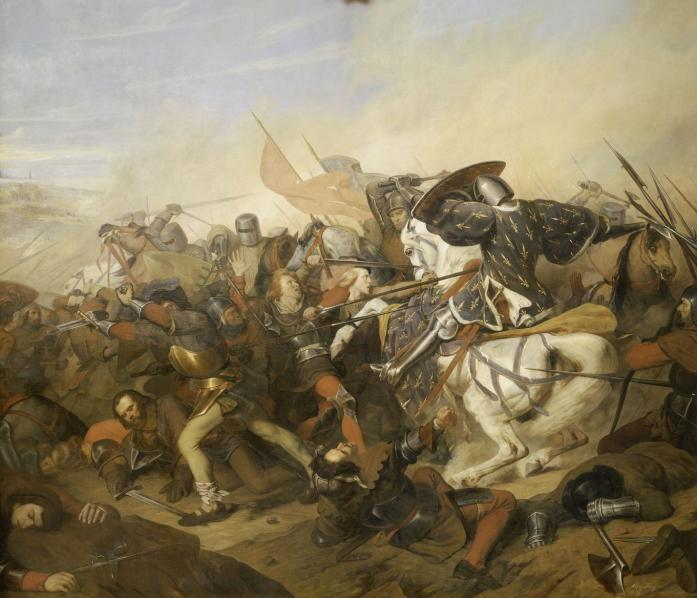
The Battle of Cassel, 1837

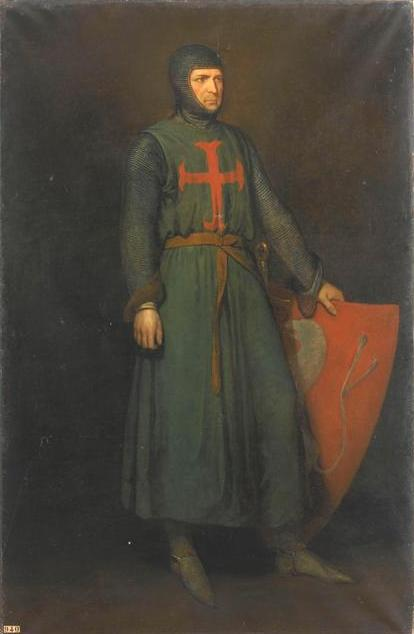
Amaury VI de Montfort

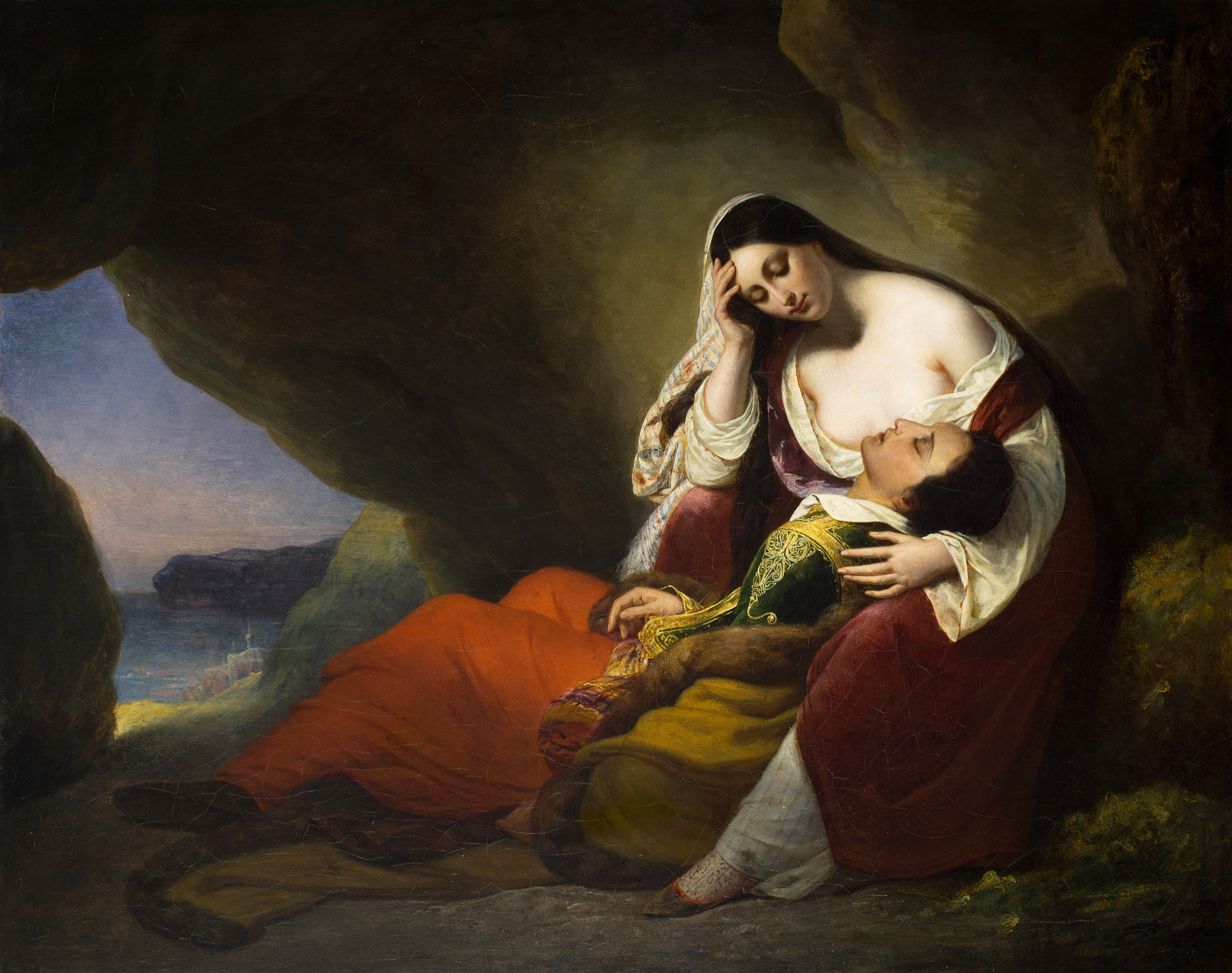
Don Juan asleep on Haidée's lap, circa 1827

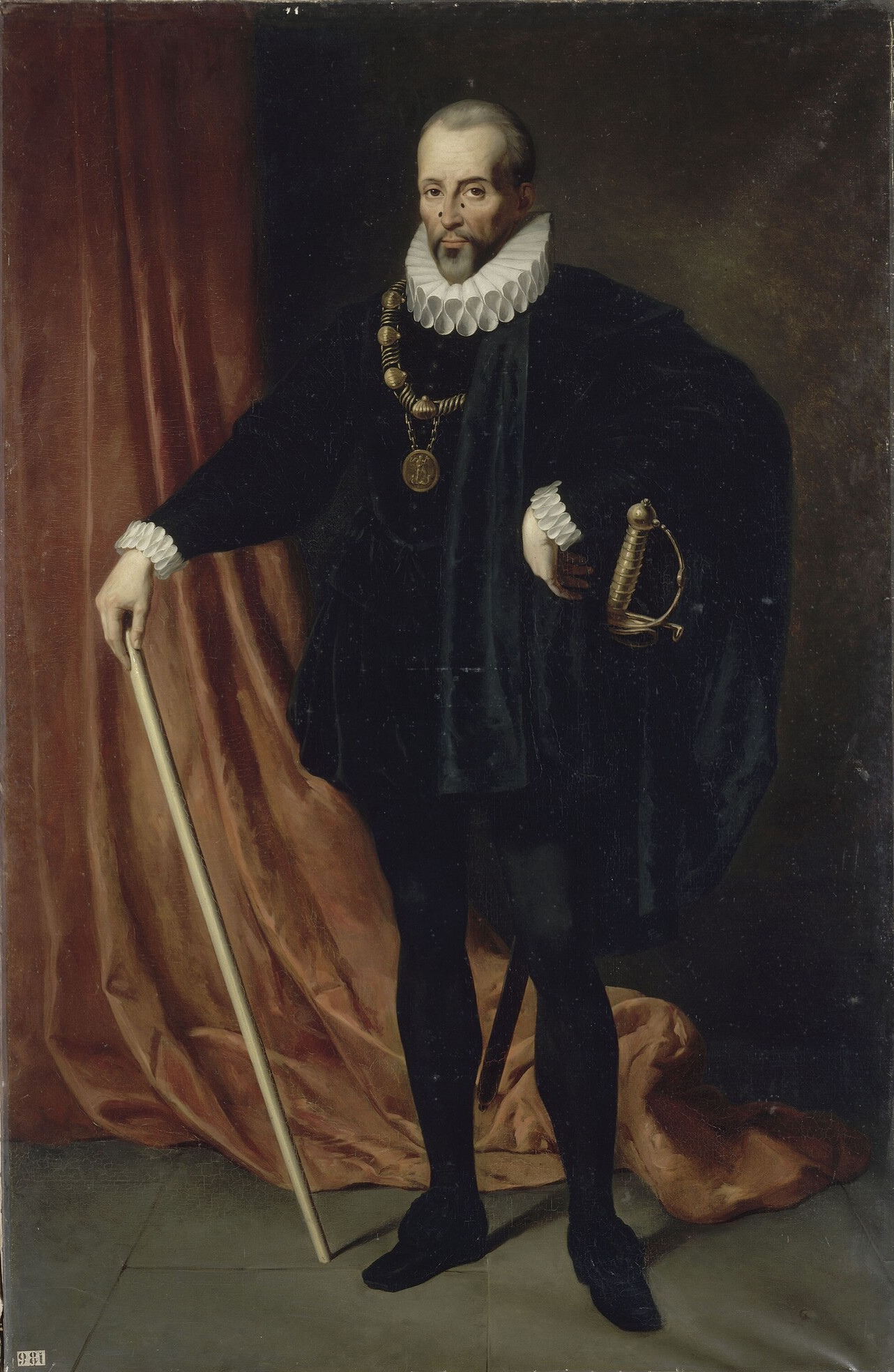
Blaise de Monluc, 1834 (commissioned by Louis Philippe I)

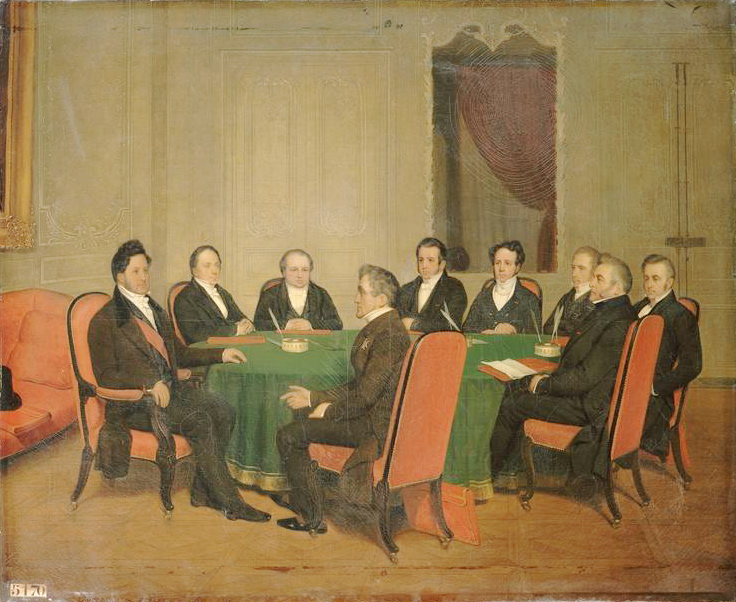
Conseil des ministres (1838)

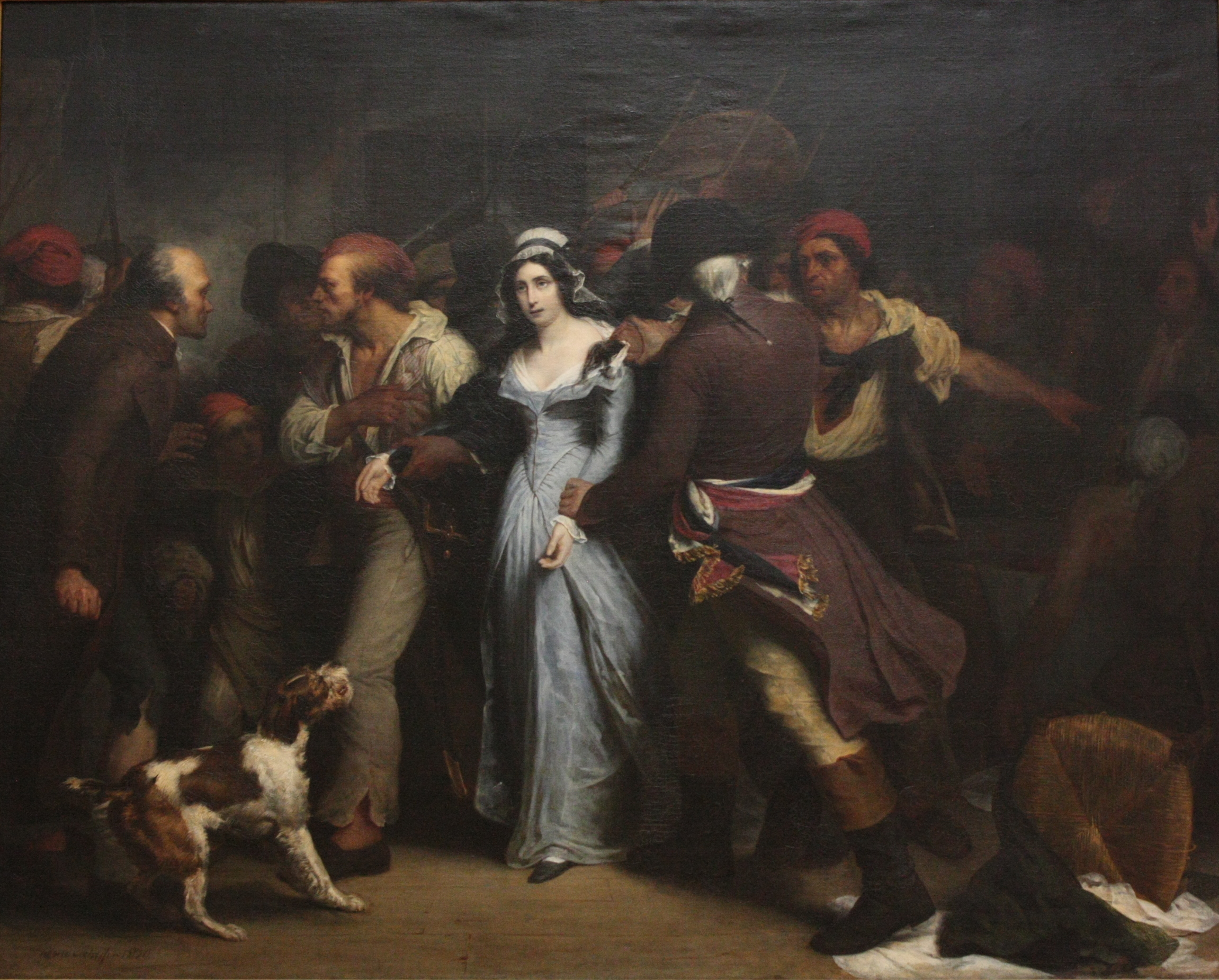
The Arrest of Charlotte Corday, 1830

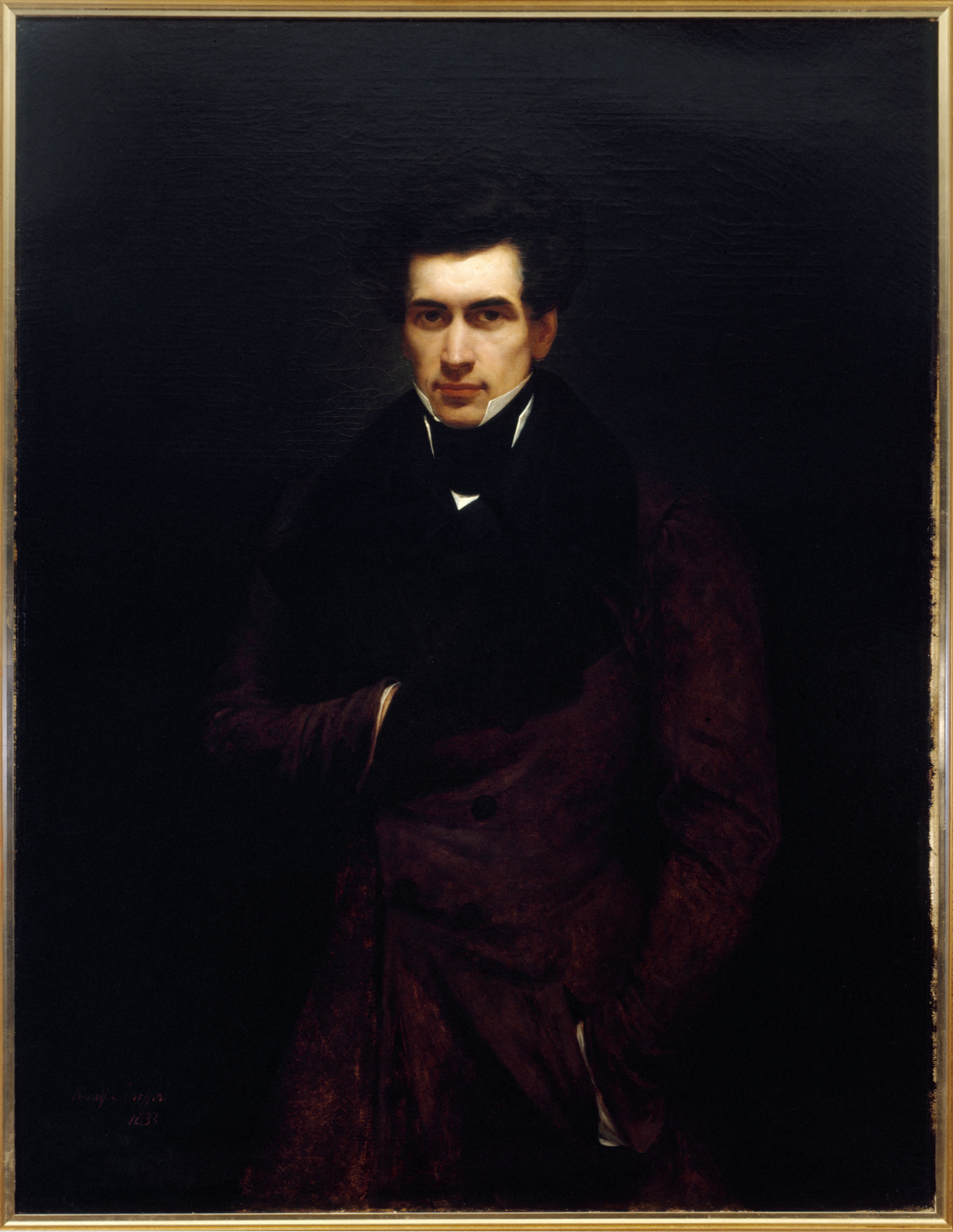
Portrait of Armand Carrel, 1833
