= 1302 in France =

- Decades: 1280s; 1290s; 1300s; 1310s; 1320s
- See also: History of France; Timeline of French history; List of years in France

Events from the year 1302 in France

== Incumbents ==
- Monarch – Philip IV

== Events ==
- January 26 – At the suggestion of France, and pursuant to the treaty signed between England and France at Asnières, King Edward I of England and the Scottish nobles led by Robert the Bruce agree to a nine-month peace treaty at Linlithgow, to last until St. Andrew's Day, November 30, 1302.
- February 10 – The papal bull Ausculta Fili is delivered to Philip IV, King of France, but Robert II, Count of Artois, snatches the document from Jacques de Normans, the emissary of Pope Boniface VIII and burns the paper in a fire.
- March 3 – Upon the death of Roger-Bernard III, Count of Foix, who had founded the Co-principality of Andorra in 1278, Roger's son Count Gaston continues as the new French administrator on behalf of King Philip of France.
- March 4 – After learning of the rejection of the papal bull Ausculta Fili by King Philip of France, Pope Boniface VIII sends Cardinal Jean Lemoine to inform King Philip of the Pope's plans for an ecclesiastical council to control the appointment of French clergy.
- April 10 – The first national assembly of the Estates General in France is convened King Philip IV at the Notre-Dame in Paris, to address a conflict with Pope Boniface VIII about the papal legate and charges of high treason against Bernard Saisset.
- May 18 – Flemish militia kill 2,000 French soldiers in the course of the Matins of Bruges, after Pieter de Coninck and Jan Breydel call on soldiers to kill all of the French occupiers of the city in Flanders. The French Governor of Flanders, Jacques de Châtillon, escapes with a handful of soldiers while disguised as a priest.
- July 11 – The Battle of the Golden Spurs takes place as retaliation against Flanders for the May 18 Matins of Bruges massacre. Flemish forces led by William of Jülich and Pieter de Coninck defeat the French army on the outskirts of Kortrijk in Flanders. Many French nobles (some 500 knights) are killed.

== Deaths ==
- March 3 – Roger-Bernard III, French nobleman and knight (b. 1243)
- July 11 (Battle of the Golden Spurs):
  - Guy I of Clermont, French nobleman and knight
  - Jacques de Châtillon, French governor, Lord of Leuze and knight
  - John I de Trie, French knight and trouvère (b. 1225)
  - John I of Ponthieu, French nobleman and knight
  - John II of Brienne, French nobleman and knight
  - Pierre Flotte, French knight, lawyer and chancellor
  - Raoul II of Clermont, French nobleman and knight
  - Robert II, French nobleman and seneschal (b. 1250)
  - Simon de Melun, French knight and Marshal (b. 1250)
  - Godfrey of Brabant, Lord of Aarschot and Vierzon, and his son John of Vierzon
  - Pierre de Flotte, chief advisor to Philip IV the Fair
- September 26 – Barthélemy de Quincy, French Grand Master

=== Date unknown ===
- Henry III of Bar, French nobleman and knight (b. 1259)
