= Church of Our Lady, Kortrijk =

Coordinates: 50°49′45″N 3°16′2″E

Church of Our Lady
- Dutch: Onze-Lieve-Vrouwekerk
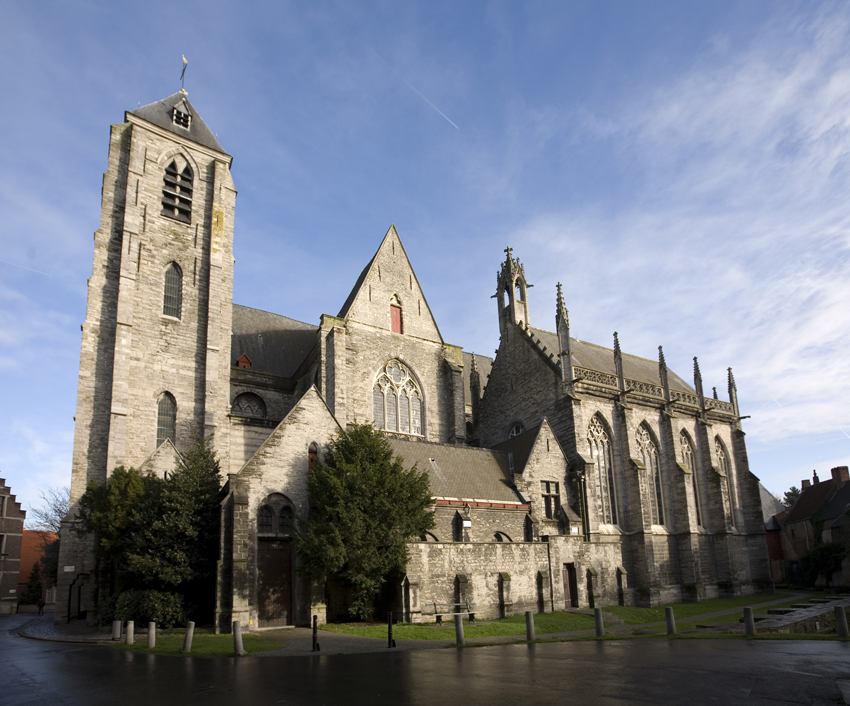
- Church of Our Lady
- Church of Our Lady
- Location: Kortrijk
- Country: Belgium
- Denomination: Roman Catholic

History
- Founded: 1199

Architecture
- Heritage designation: Monument
- Style: Romanesque

The Church of Our Lady (Dutch: Onze-Lieve-Vrouwekerk) is a former collegiate church located in the centre of Kortrijk, Belgium. It was built and established by Baldwin IX, Count of Flanders in 1199.

== History ==
=== Early history ===
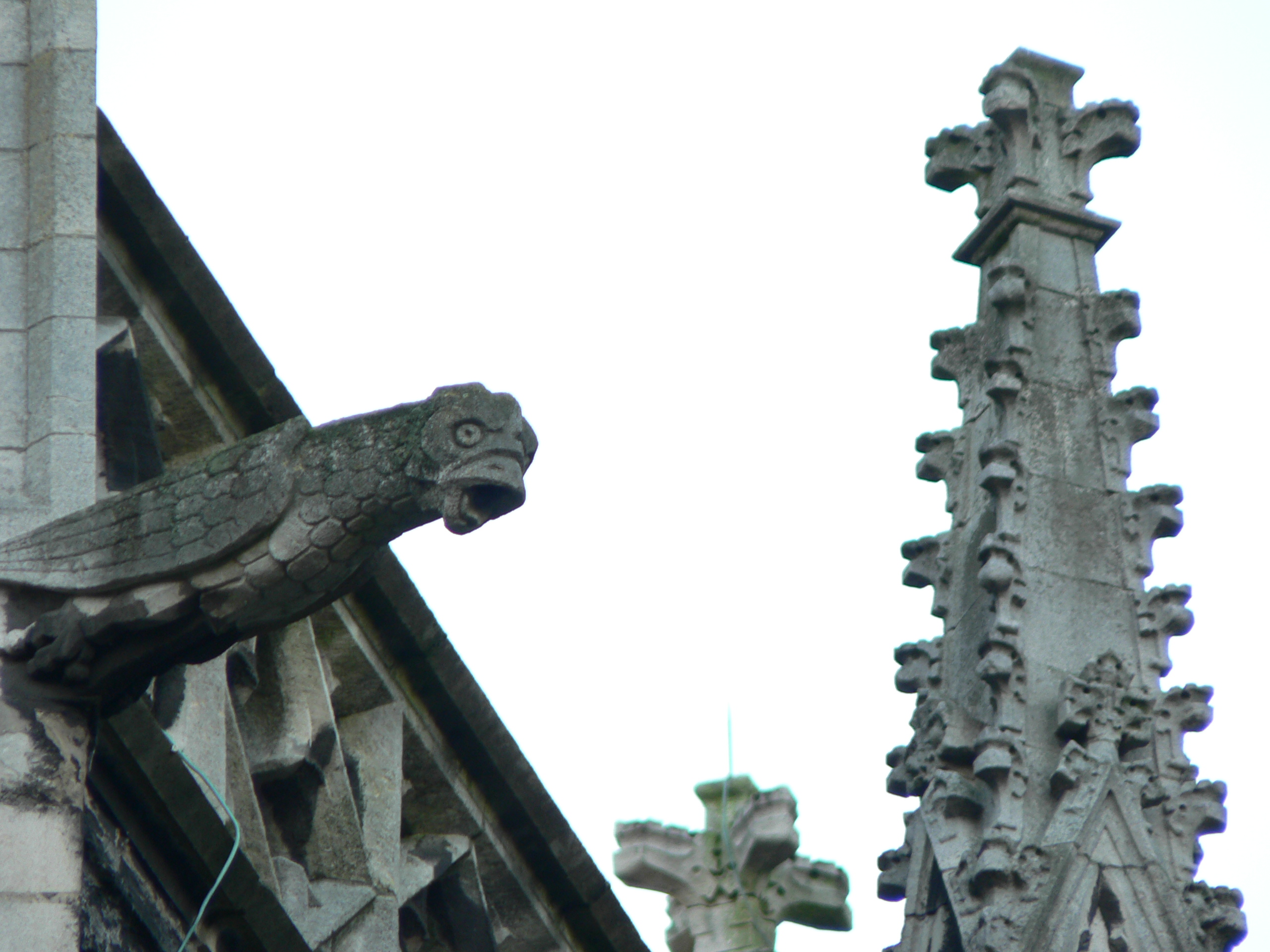
A Gargoyle on the outside

The church played a major role in the history of the County of Flanders. The original chapel was situated within the domain of the Counts of Flanders which was, except for the part along the river Lys, fully walled. By request of Balduin IX and his wif Mary of Champagne, the chapel was extended and became church. Inside a collegiate chapter with twelve canons in honour of our lady was installed by request of the Count. This chapter received papal approbation in 1203 by Pope Innocent III. Th count provided himself the Prebendaries and gave important relics, that came from Jerusalem with the crusades. The chapter was considered one of the most important of Flanders.

After the Battle of the Golden Spurs in 1302, which took place nearby on the Groeningekouter, the Flemish people hung 500 Golden Spurs of killed French knights on the ceiling of the church. Mercenaries took them away, in 1382 after the Battle of Roosebeke. They were replaced by replicas which can still be seen in the church.

In 1370, Count Louis II of Flanders had the Count's chapel built to be a mausoleum for himself and in honour of Saint Catherine. The chapel contains frescos of all the counts and governors of Flanders, during the Spanish and Austrian periods.

During the 15th century, the church was renovated. The castle was not restored and the domain was parcelled out (O.L.V.-straat, Konventstraat, Guido Gezellestraat, Kapittelstraat and Pieter de Cockelaerestraat). Only the church, the Broeltowers and the Artillery tower are the remains of the former medieval castle.

=== 18th and 19th centuries ===
In 1797, French troops invaded the city. They chased the canons out of their church and together with twelve convents, chapels and churches, the church was sold. The archives of the chapter were brought to the city archives and other possessions were destroyed. Thanks to the concordat between Napoleon and Pope Pius VII, the church became the parish church of the parish of Our Lady. The canons never returned.

Guido Gezelle was the priest of this parish between 1872 and 1889.

== Interior ==
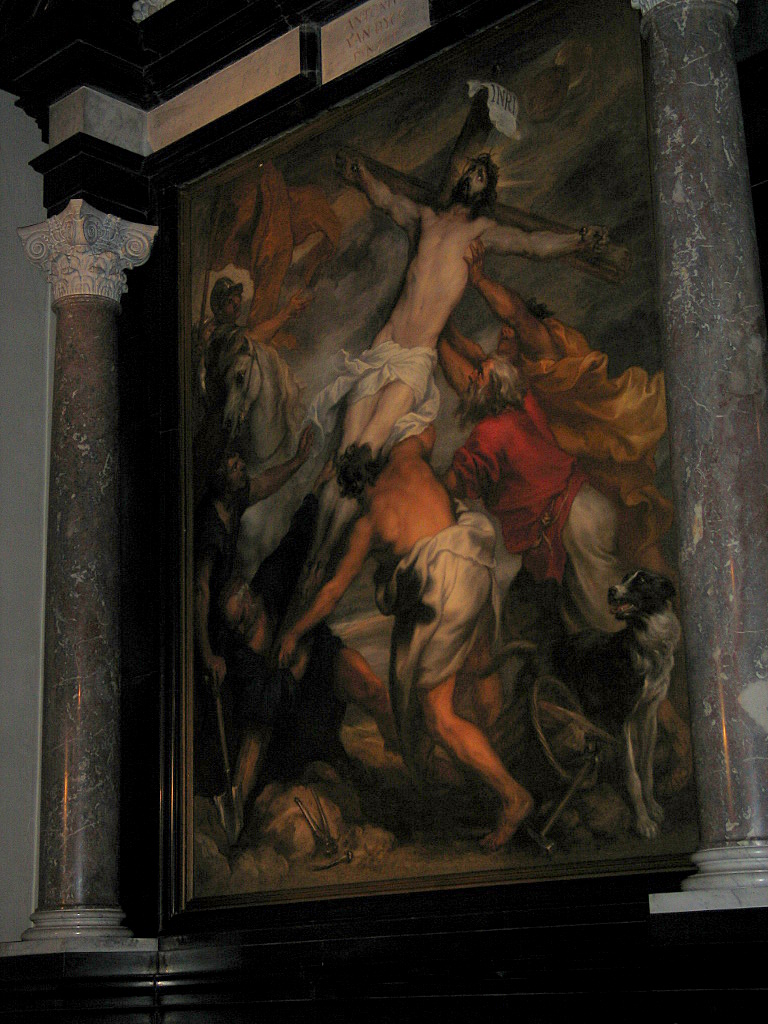
Altarpiece by Anthony van Dyck

The church is currently still used as a parish church, most of the interior dates from the late Baroque period. The mean organ is sculpted in Rococo style, built by Van Peteghem. The church also contains other important treasures such as the altarpiece of Anthony van Dyck’s Raising of the Cross. This painting was commanded by the reverend canon Roger Braye, dating 1631. In the choir chapels we can find important graves and memorials. In the south a small door gives access to the gothic "Gravenkapel". After the Second World War some parts needed to be restored.
