= Still Bill (disambiguation) =

Still Bill is a 1972 studio album by American soul musician Bill Withers.

Still Bill may also refer to:

- Still Bill (film), a 2009 documentary film about musician Bill Withers
- "Still Bill", the nickname of the statue, William the Silent, at Rutgers University in New Brunswick, New Jersey
