= 1305 in France =

- Decades: 1280s; 1290s; 1300s; 1310s; 1320s
- See also: History of France; Timeline of French history; List of years in France

The following events occurred in France in the year 1305.

== Incumbents ==
- Monarch – Philip IV

== Events ==
- March 25 – The College of Navarre, one of the colleges of the historic University of Paris is founded.
- March 31/April 2 –
  - Queen of France Joan I dies in childbirth.
  - Philip IV of France loses the title of Philip I King of Navarre and Count of Champagne upon the death of his wife Joan I of Navarre. Philip refused to remarry after Joan's death, despite the great political and financial rewards of doing so.
- April – New Mongol ruler Öljaitü sends letters to Philip IV of France, Pope Clement V, and Edward I of England offering a military collaboration between the Christian nations of Europe and the Mongols against the Mamluks.
- June 23 – The Treaty of Athis-sur-Orge is signed between King Philip IV of France and Robert III of Flanders. The treaty was signed at Athis-sur-Orge and concluded the Franco-Flemish War, as it recognised Flemish independence as a fief, but at the cost of the cities of Lille, Douai and Béthune, which were transferred to the French crown-lands, and the paying of exorbitant fines to Philip IV.

== Births ==
=== Date unknown ===
- Arnoul d'Audrehem, French nobleman, knight and marshal (d. 1370)
- Peter Thomas, French monk, archbishop and theologian (d. 1366)
- Philippe de Cabassoles, French bishop and papal legate (d. 1372)

== Deaths ==
- March 1 – Blanche of France, French princess and duchess (b. 1278)
- March 7 – Guy of Dampierre, French nobleman and knight (b. 1226)
- April 2 – Joan I of Navarre, French queen consort and regent (b. 1273)
- October 9 – Robert de Pontigny, French abbot and cardinal
- November 18 – John II, French nobleman and knight (b. 1239)

=== Date unknown ===
- Guillaume de Villaret, French knight and Grand Master (b. 1235)
