= Jan Breydel =

Likely leader of the Bruges Matins massacre in 1302

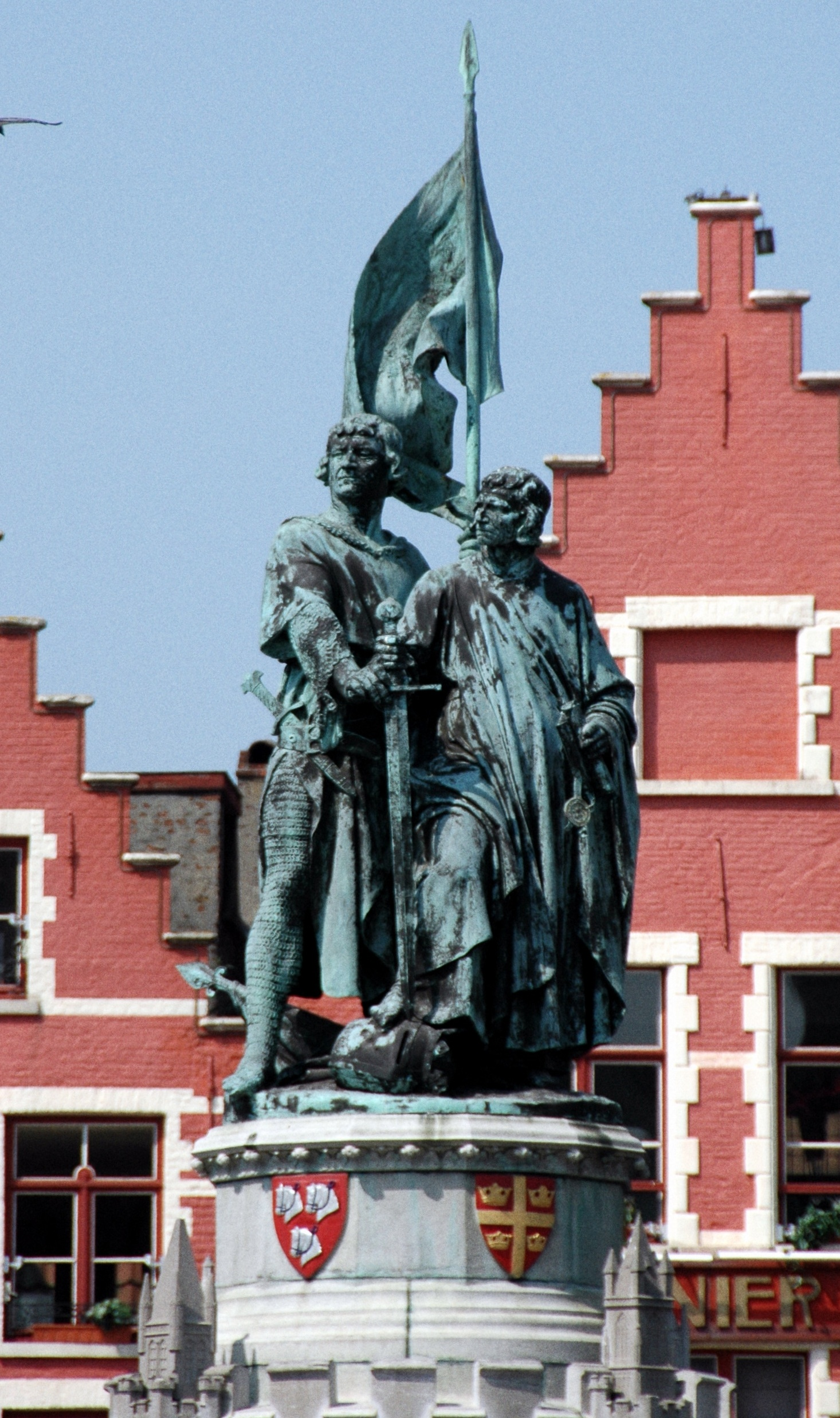
Statue of Jan Breydel and Pieter de Coninck in Bruges, Belgium

Jan Breydel (Dutch pronunciation: [jɑm ˈbrɛidəl]; c. 1264 – between 1328 and 1333) is credited with leading the Bruges Matins (Brugse Metten), a violent uprising against Philip the Fair. He is said to have played a major role in the Franco-Flemish War, even though his authenticity has since been questioned.

== Personal life ==
Not much is known about the personal life of Jan Breydel. Neither his date of birth, nor the date of his death are known for certain. Breydel learned the trade of butcher and lived in Bruges at the time of the uprising. He is said to have originated from a wealthy family.

== Combats ==
Breydel is believed to have led the Bruges Matins together with Pieter de Coninck, a weaver, on the night of 17 to 18 May 1302. They invaded a French garrison and killed several distinguished Leliaards (patricians loyal to the king of France). About three weeks before, on 1 May that year, they had participated in an attack on Male Castle and the complete annihilation of the French garrison there. The city archives of Bruges show that Jan Breydel was present from 8 July until 10 July 1302, in Kortrijk, as a supplier of meat for the troops. On the basis of this record, it is generally accepted that he had fought on 11 July 1302 in the Battle of the Golden Spurs, even though there is no concrete evidence that he was present on the battlegrounds.

In 1309, Breydel, together with Pieter de Coninck and Jan Heem, again led an uprising in Bruges, aimed against the Treaty of Athis-sur-Orge (1305) forced upon Flanders by the French.

== Legacy ==
Jan Breydel, alongside his ally Pieter de Coninck, has often been portrayed as a patriotic hero in Belgium because of his passion for Flemish identity. Thanks to Hendrik Conscience’s book “The Lion of Flanders, or the Battle of the Golden Spurs” (Dutch: De Leeuw van Vlaenderen, of de Slag der Gulden Sporen), his role in the uprising was put under a magnifying glass and he developed into one of the most iconic figures of Flemish lore. To this day, the Bruges Matins and the Battle of the Golden Spurs are often referenced to as cornerstones of an emerging Flemish identity in the Middle Ages, while being a part of a widespread movement of revolts, riots, conspiracies and military actions led by urban butchers across Late Medieval European cities. The emerging Flemish movement in the 19th century, of which Hendrik Conscience was one of the leaders, often referred to the Battle of the Golden Spurs as a Flemish victory against a French occupying force. Nowadays, especially Flemish nationalist parties (as, for example, Vlaams Belang), aiming for Flemish independence, have taken up this talking point, as it showcases the victory of an oppressed Flemish infantry against a highly superior French foe. Belgian historian Henri Pirenne, on the other hand, especially laid emphasis on the social scale of the conflict. He is also credited with ensuring the survival of the Dutch language in the northern part of Belgium. The statue Jan Breydel shares with Pieter de Coninck has decorated the Market Place in Bruges ever since 1887.

=== Controversy surrounding his authenticity ===
Contrary to the praise of Jan Breydel as a Flemish hero however, there have also been critical accounts of Breydel. According to Lisa Demets, the historical perception of Jan Breydel as one of the leaders of the Bruges Matins and the Battle of the Golden Spurs is false:

"Er is geen enkel bewijs dat een Jan Breydel ook werkelijk kapitein was van de Brugse Metten of de Guldensporenslag" […] "Er waren op dat moment drie Jan Breydels. Waarschijnlijk hebben er wel Breydels meegevochten met het leger en hebben ze ook allerlei dingen geleverd, want het waren oorspronkelijk beenhouwers. Maar heel de kapiteinsfunctie is in het begin van de 15e eeuw verzonnen."

“There isn’t a single piece of evidence that Jan Breydel was the leader of the Bruges Matins or the Battle of the Golden Spurs” […] “At that moment, there were three Jan Breydels. There were probably Breydels who fought in the army and they probably also delivered goods, given the fact they were originally butchers. But the whole function as a leader was invented in the early 15th century.”

According to Demets, the contemporary image of Breydel as one of the heroes of the Franco-Flemish War was made up by his family more than 100 years later. There had been accounts of a Jan Breydel in sources after 1302; however, the portrayal of the Breydel in those sources was rather negative, referring to him as an alcoholic and even murderer. In 1400, however, the portrayals of Jan Breydel suddenly starting getting more positive, portraying him as a hero. Demets states that this was probably an attempt by the Breydel family to increase political influence and fortify their position in Bruges.

== Trivia ==
- The Jan Breydel football stadium of Club Brugge and Cercle Brugge is named after him.
