= Groeningepoort =

Coordinates: 50.8292°N 3.2735°E

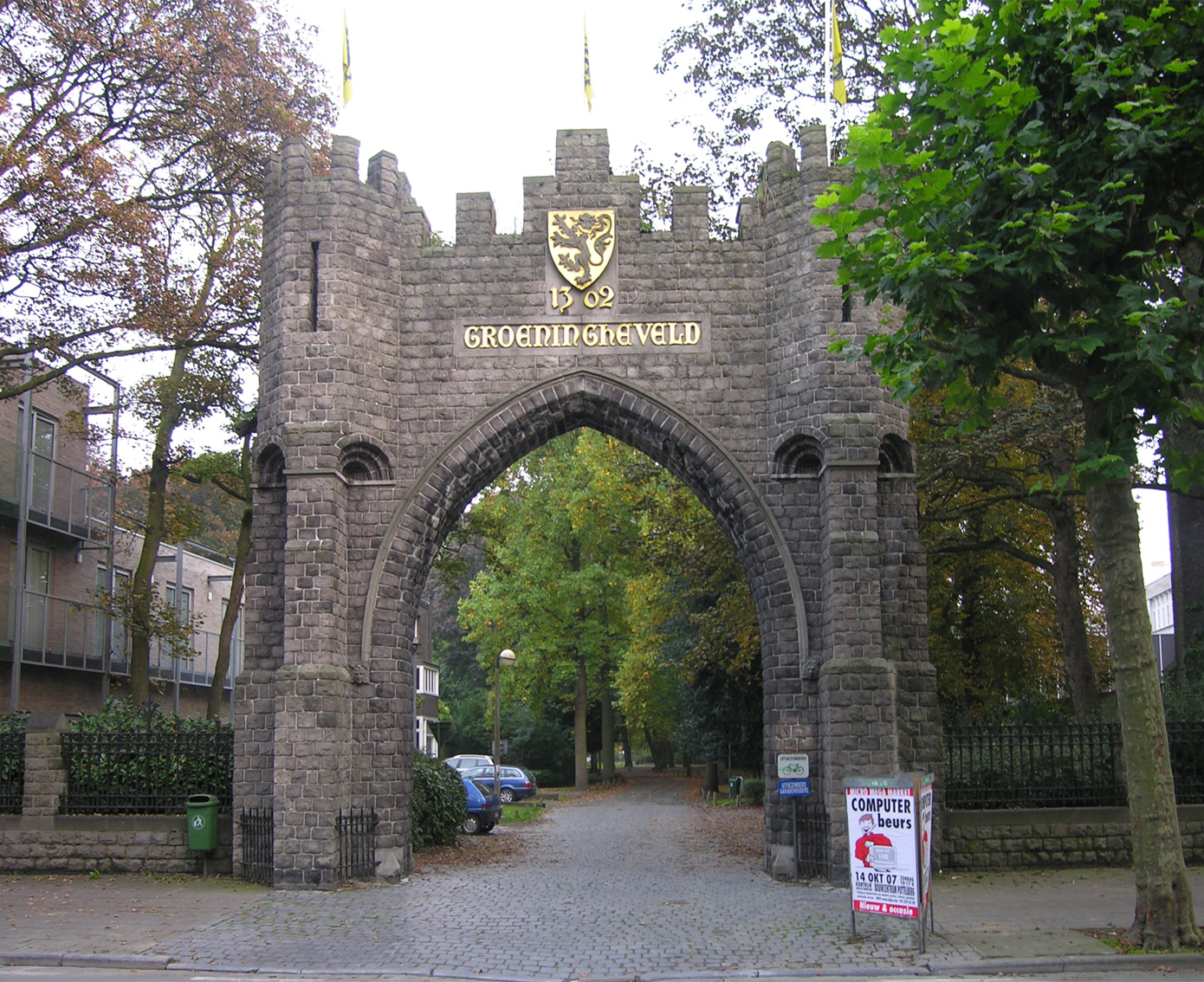
The Groeningegate

The Groeningepoort is a monument in the Belgian city of Kortrijk. The triumphal arch was built to commemorate the 600th anniversary of the Battle of the Golden Spurs and gives access to the Groeningepark, where during the Middle Ages the Groeninge battlefield was situated. In this park you can also find the golden Groeninge Monument. The Groeningepoort was designed by Jozef Viérin and erected in 1908 in a neogothic style. It bears a golden shield with a Flemish lion and has the inscription 1302 – Groeningheveld. It is a protected monument.
