= Jan Borluut =

19th century depiction of Jan Borluut by Albrecht De Vriendt

Jan Borluut (ca. 1250 – murdered, Ghent, before 1306) was a patrician from Ghent.

Jan Borluut was born into a rich patrician family of wool merchants, members of which continuously held magistrate positions in the city of Ghent from the 13th to the 16th century.

After committing manslaughter in a feud with another patrician, he was banned (killing another opponent in the process), on the 11 July 1302 he commanded a band of outcasts from Ghent against the French at the Battle of the Golden Spurs, led by the famous Jan Breydel de Groeninghe.

At a later, undetermined time he was killed in Ghent by his opponents.

He was related to Elisabeth Borluut, who, together with her husband Joos Vijdt, commissioned the creation of the famous Ghent Altarpiece (1432), which now resides in the 'baptist chapel' from the Saint Bavo Cathedral in Ghent.

Jan Borluut, Patrician of Ghent (1879) by Belgian artist Jan van Beers

On the façade of a romanesque manor located at the 'Korenmarkt' in Ghent, also called the 'Borluutsteen', the family coat of arms are visible: three running deer.
