= Statue of William the Silent =

Statue at Rutgers University, New Jersey

William the Silent
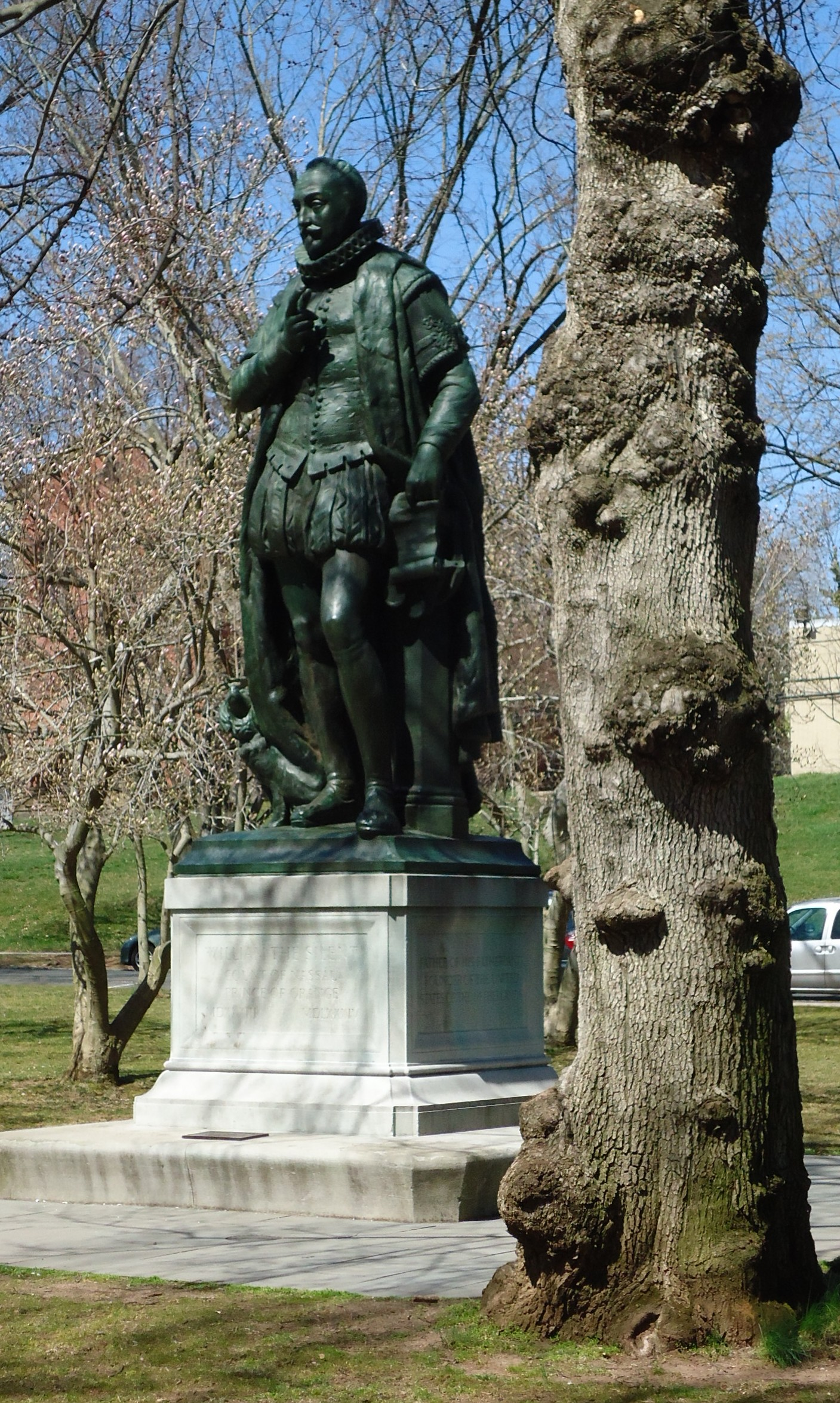
- Statue of William the Silent on Rutgers University's Voorhees Mall
- Artist: Toon Dupuis (1877–1937) after Lodewyk Royer (1793–1868); Fonderie Nationale des Bronzes
- Year: 1920
- Type: Bronze sculpture, granite base
- Location: New Brunswick, New Jersey, United States; 40°30.087′N 74°26.877′W
- Owner: Rutgers, The State University of New Jersey
- Accession: Dedicated June 9, 1928

A bronze statue of William the Silent (also known as Willie the Silent and Still Bill) was installed in 1928 on the Voorhees Mall section of Rutgers University's College Avenue Campus in New Brunswick, New Jersey. It is along Seminary Place, a street at the western end of the Voorhees Mall, and near several academic buildings, including the university's Graduate School of Education, Van Dyke Hall, and Milledoler Hall.

The statue is of William I, Prince of Orange (1533–1584), an early leader of the Dutch revolt against Habsburg Spain which led to the Netherlands' independence in 1648. It was donated by Dr. Fenton B. Turck to commemorate the university's Dutch heritage. Turck, with the assistance of railroad executive and Rutgers alumnus Leonor F. Loree, arranged the anonymous donation through the Holland Society of New York.

The statue has continued to be part of student life as the Voorhees Mall had been the site of student and community events, including graduation ceremonies, pep rallies, festivals, and protests. It has occasionally been a target of vandalism in the historical rivalry between students of Rutgers and Princeton University. It was restored in 2006 in an effort funded by alumni donations.

== History ==
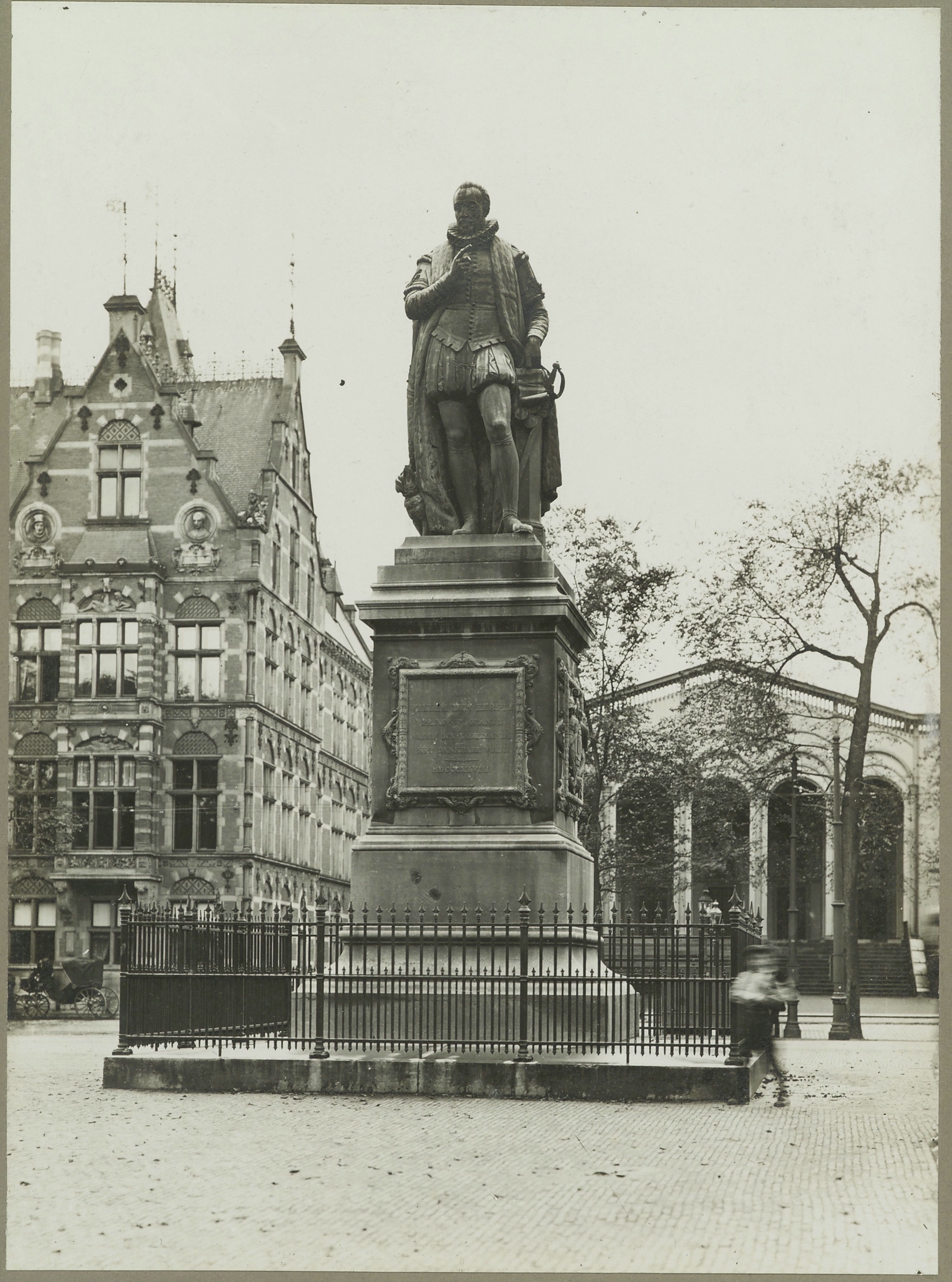
The original statue of William the Silent (1848) by Royer in The Hague's Het Plein

=== Acquisition and installation ===
While travelling in Europe after World War I, biologist and physician Dr. Fenton Benedict Turck (1857–1932) purchased a bronze statue of William I (1533–1584), Count of Nassau, Prince of Orange, and national hero of the Netherlands. William, known as "William the Silent" (Dutch: Willem de Zwijger) and "William of Orange" (Dutch: Willem van Oranje), was the main leader of the Dutch revolt against the Spanish that set off the Eighty Years' War and resulted in the formal independence of the United Provinces in 1648. For this reason, William is known as the "Father of the Fatherland" (Dutch: Vader des Vaderlands) of the Netherlands. The statue is a replica of a similar monument created in 1848 by Dutch sculptor Lodewyk Royer (1793–1868) that was installed in Het Plein, a city square in the Hague's Oude Centrum (trans. "Old Center"). The plaster mold for Royer's original statue was kept in Brussels during World War I and after the war, the Dutch government permitted one copy of the statue to be made by sculptor Toon Dupuis (1877–1937) at the Fonderie Nationale des Bronzes, a foundry in Brussels, before destroying the mold.

A graduate of Chicago's Northwestern University Medical School, Turck was an internist, medical researcher in cell biology, inventor of cytost serum, and author of The Action of the Living Cell (1933) as well as many tracts on gastrointestinal diseases. Turck was a direct descendant of Dr. Paschasius Turck, a sixteenth-century Dutch physician who treated William the Silent after he received severe wounds in a 1581 assassination attempt. During his return voyage to the United States, Turck "began to feel guilty about the great cost of the statue" and decided to keep the purchase hidden from his wife by storing the statue in the basement of his New York City laboratory at 428 Lafayette Street in Lower Manhattan. It remained in Turck's possession, stored in the laboratory basement, for eight years (1920–1928).

Turck had become a member of the Holland Society of New York in 1917 and was active in their events and affairs. As early as 1887, the Holland Society had sought to install a prominent monument in New York City to celebrate the city's Dutch heritage. The society agreed on William the Silent as the monument's subject in 1892 and was urged to install the monument in the city's Central Park. In the following years, the society considered commissioning the work from prominent American sculptors Augustus Saint-Gaudens (1848–1907) and Daniel Chester French (1850–1931). In 1913, Tunis Bergen, a physician chairing the Holland Society's committee investigating options for a monument, visited the Netherlands and enquired whether a copy of the Royer's statue in the Hague could be made and took measurements and photographs of the work. Subsequently, World War I delayed the society's plans. Throughout the 1920s, the Holland Society had proposed to install Turck's statue in several locations in New York City, in Albany, New York, and other locations along the Hudson Valley.

In 1924, the Holland Society of New York renewed its efforts to install a monument in a prominent location in New York City's Central Park. The proposal was initially accepted by city Parks Commissioner Francis Dawson Gallatin (1870–1933), but opposed by the city's Art Commission. The Art Commission's assistant secretary H. R. Marshall recommended that the statue be donated to Rutgers College as they recently installed a new college president, John Martin Thomas, adding that it would be a "nice new and very visible gift, tying the university to its Dutch legacy at the height of the fashion for colonial revivals". While Turck was having dinner with his close friend, railroad executive Leonor Fresnel Loree (1858–1940) discussed the Dutch roots of Rutgers University, his alma mater, and convinced Turck to donate the statue to the university. At the time, Loree was serving on the college's board of trustees. Rutgers, chartered in 1766 as Queen's College was the eighth of nine colleges established before the American Revolution and had been founded by Dutch Reformed clergymen from New York and New Jersey. After its founding, the college was affiliated with the church through the early nineteenth century, and graduated many students of Dutch ancestry. Turck desired to donate the statue anonymously, and with Loree's assistance, arranged for the Holland Society to transfer the statue to Rutgers. Bergen, now a Rutgers trustee in addition to continuing his efforts as chairman of the Holland Society's statue committee, said that it was "particularly fitting that the statue should stand on the grounds of the educational institution founded by descendants of the Netherlands". The statue was delivered and installed at Rutgers at the western end of the Voorhees Mall. It was dedicated during a ceremony held on June 9, 1928.

=== Involvement in campus life ===
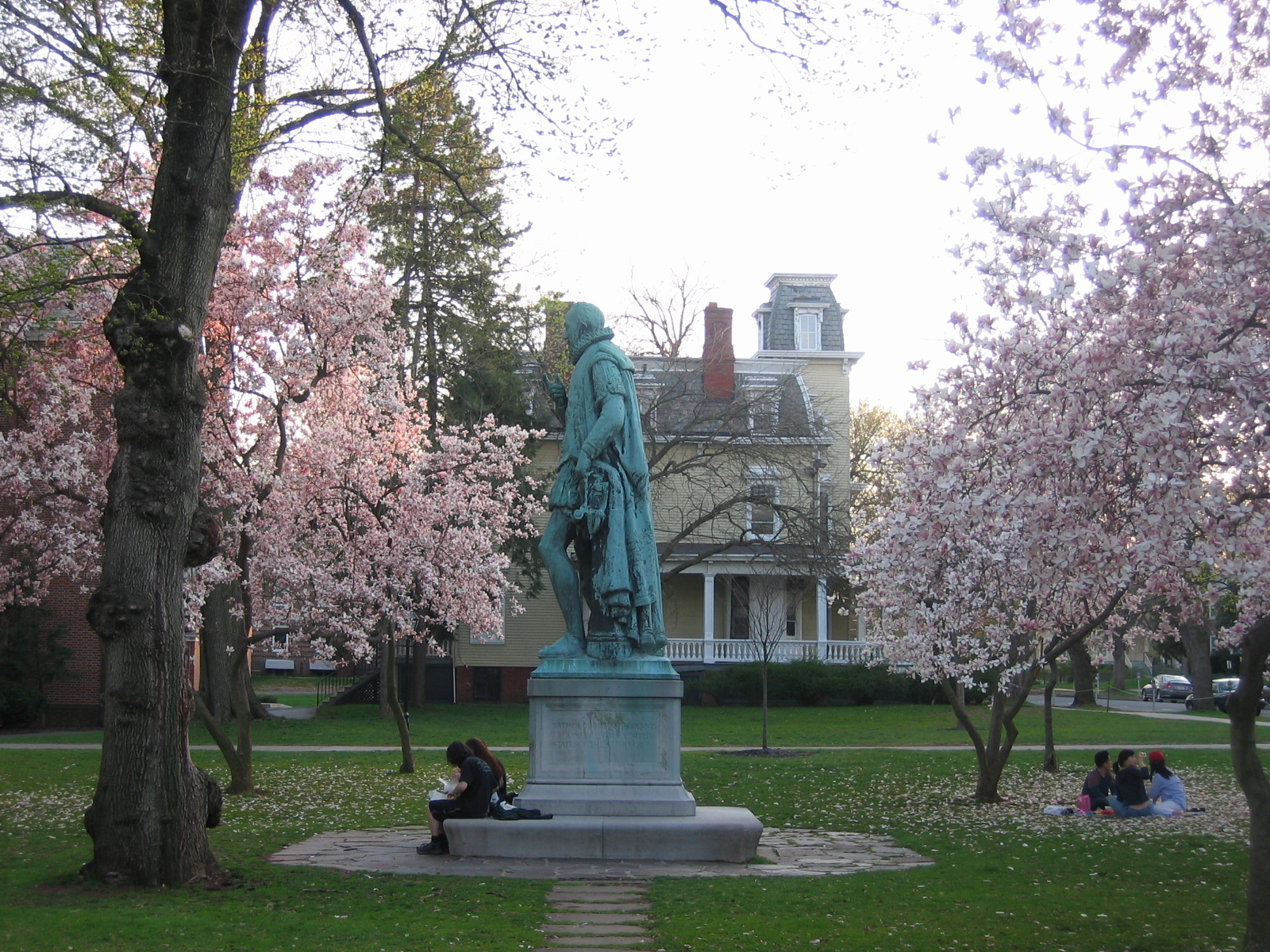
Looking south, William the Silent during the blooming of the cherry trees on the Voorhees Mall

Rutgers students affectionately call the statue "Willie the Silent" and "Still Bill". According to student tradition, the statue is expected to whistle should a virgin happen to walk by, though Rutgers American studies professor and folklorist Angus Kress Gillespie remarked that "over the last 200 years, he hasn't yet whistled". The statue continues to be included in student life at Voorhees Mall is used as the site of student and community events, graduation ceremonies (until 2010), pep rallies for the football team and other athletic teams, Dutch-American festivals, as well as protests including anti-war protests and strike rallies in the 1970s. On the afternoon of October 11, 1976, United States Senator Ted Kennedy of Massachusetts held a campaign rally at Rutgers during the presidential election of 1976. Kennedy addressed a crowd of approximately 1,000 students the Voorhees Mall in front of the statue of William the Silent. Before Kennedy began his speech he "had to quell boos and heckling by some students holding anti-Kennedy signs".

Occasionally, the statue is a target of vandalism in ongoing historical rivalry between students of Rutgers and Princeton University. This rivalry which dates to the two schools playing the first intercollegiate football game in New Brunswick in 1869 and an escalating series of pranks and thefts "under the cover of night" including the theft of a cannon on the Princeton campus in 1875 that became known as the Rutgers–Princeton Cannon War. Over the years, Princeton students have frequently doused the William the Silent statue with orange paint, usually in advance of athletic events. On October 11, 1947, before the annual football game between the two schools, "in the early hours of the morning a group of Tigers (i.e. Princeton students) infiltrated the Rutgers campus and painted the statue of William the Silent". In 2006, Rutgers police officers chased several vandals from the site, allegedly Princeton students, who had painted a large penis and the word "Princeton" several times on the statue.

The statue was restored in 2006 with funds donated by the university's alumni from the Class of 1956. Approximately $150,000 in reunion campaign funds were used to restore the four historic gates on the university's historic Queens Campus and the William the Silent statue. It was cleaned to remove the effects of graffiti and transparent tape residue, and conservation efforts were needed to restore the statue's bronze casting and granite base.

== Description ==
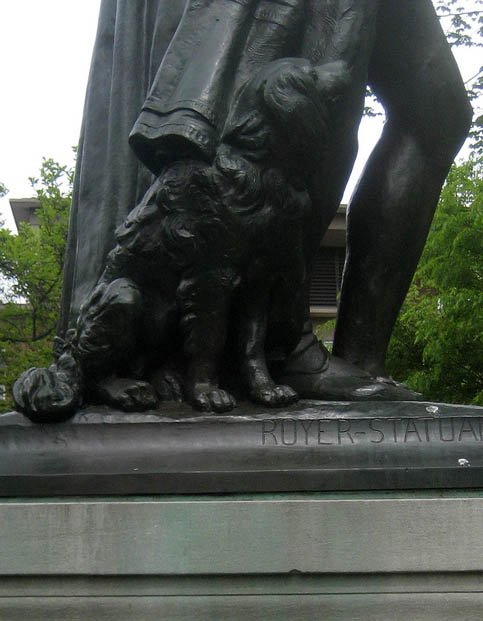
Detail of the dog Pompey sitting at William the Silent's right

In 1928, the statue of William the Silent was installed at the western end of Voorhees Mall, a section of academic buildings on the College Avenue Campus in New Brunswick. It is located along Seminary Place, a city street that flanks the western side of the Mall, and separates the Rutgers campus from that of the New Brunswick Theological Seminary. The statue is placed near several academic buildings, including the university's Graduate School of Education, Van Dyke Hall, and Milledoler Hall.

According to the Smithsonian Institution's Art Inventories Catalog, the bronze sculpture is approximately 15 feet in height and installed on a square stone base approximately 6 feet in height. It is recorded as weighing 2,000 pounds. (Note: The Smithsonian's catalogue describes the statue's dimensions as: "Sculpture: approx. 15 x 5 1/2 x 5 ft.; Base: approx. 6 x 12 x 12 ft. (2,000 lbs.).") The sculpture depicts William the Silent standing:

"...with his proper right hand raised to his chest, pointing with his index finger. He holds an open scroll with his proper left hand. A small dog sits at his feet on his proper right. William the Silent wears the clothes of a civilian magistrate of the 16th century. He has a moustache and a beard, and he wears a ruffled collar, an open ankle-length coat, a buttoned vest, and bloomers. The sculpture is mounted on a square base."

Each of the four side of the statue's square base is inscribed with incised letters:

- Front: (facing east): WILLIAM THE SILENT / COUNT OF NASSAU / PRINCE OF ORANGE / MDXXXIII MDLXXXIV
- Back (facing west): THE HOLLAND SOCIETY / OF NEW YORK / TO RUTGERS UNIVERSITY / MCMXXVIII
- Right (facing south): FATHER OF HIS FATHERLAND / FOUNDER OF THE UNITED / STATES OF THE NETHERLANDS
- Left (facing north): AS LONG AS HE LIVED / HE WAS THE GUIDING STAR / OF A WHOLE BRAVE NATION / AND WHEN HE DIED THE / LITTLE CHILDREN CRIED

The sculpture bears two inscriptions, a signed Founder's mark, near its base: "ROYER – STATUAIRE" and "FONDERIE NATLE DES BRONZES".

== Gallery ==
The statue
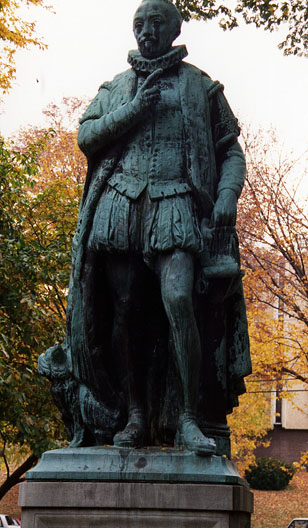
Front side of the statue, circa 1994

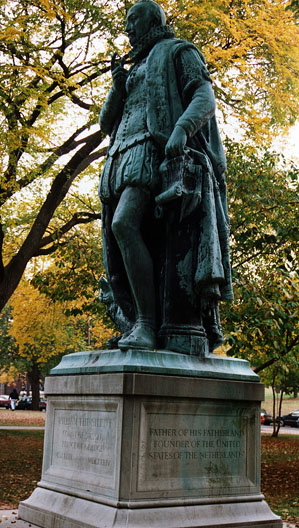
Front and proper left side of statue, looking toward southwest, circa 1994

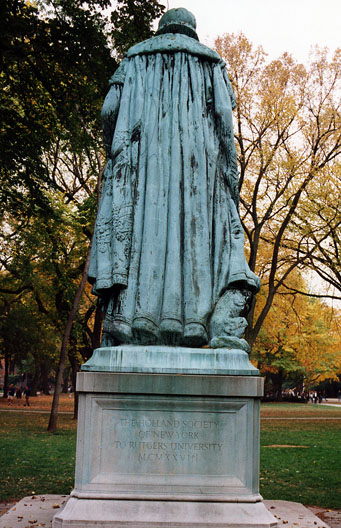
The back side of the statue seen from Seminary Place, circa 1994
Inscriptions
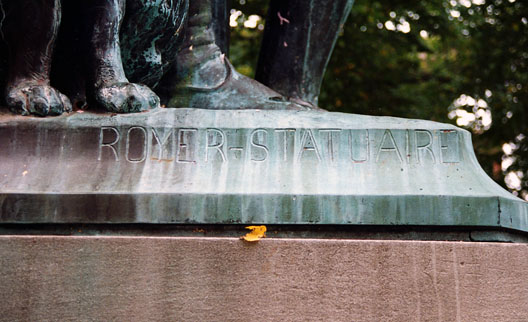
Founder's mark, "Royer-Statuaire" on the statue's base

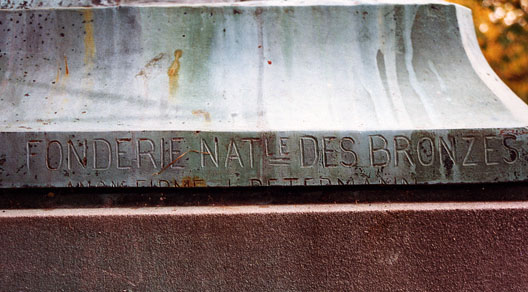
Founder's mark, "Fonderie Nationale des Bronzes" on the statue's base

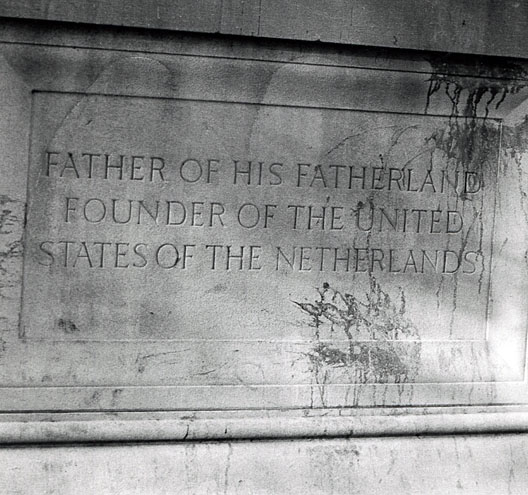
Inscription on the stone base, right side

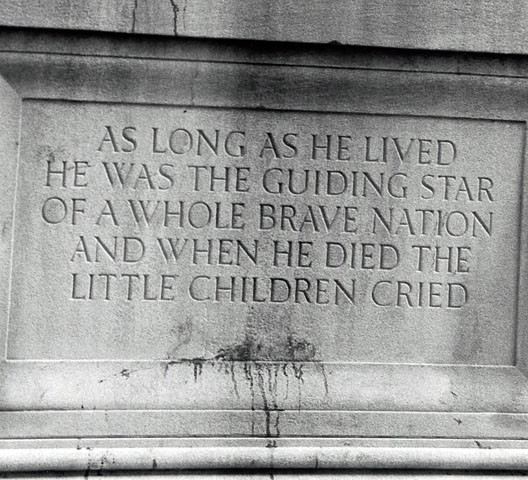
Inscription on the stone base, left side
