= Jan Heem =

Jan Heem (end 13th century – beginning 14th century) was a Flemish craftsman and politician. He was co-leader of the Bruges Matins massacre of 1302 but does not appear with Jan Breydel and Pieter de Coninck on the statue that stands in the marketplace of Bruges.

When the rebels took over the city of Bruges in March 1302, he was appointed as mayor. He was a simple guildsman who was often seen at the side of Pieter de Coninck. During the period 1323 - 1328, and at the Battle of Cassel, Jan Heem was one of the leaders of Bruges.
