= Groeninge Monument =

Coordinates: 50.8287°N 3.2758°E

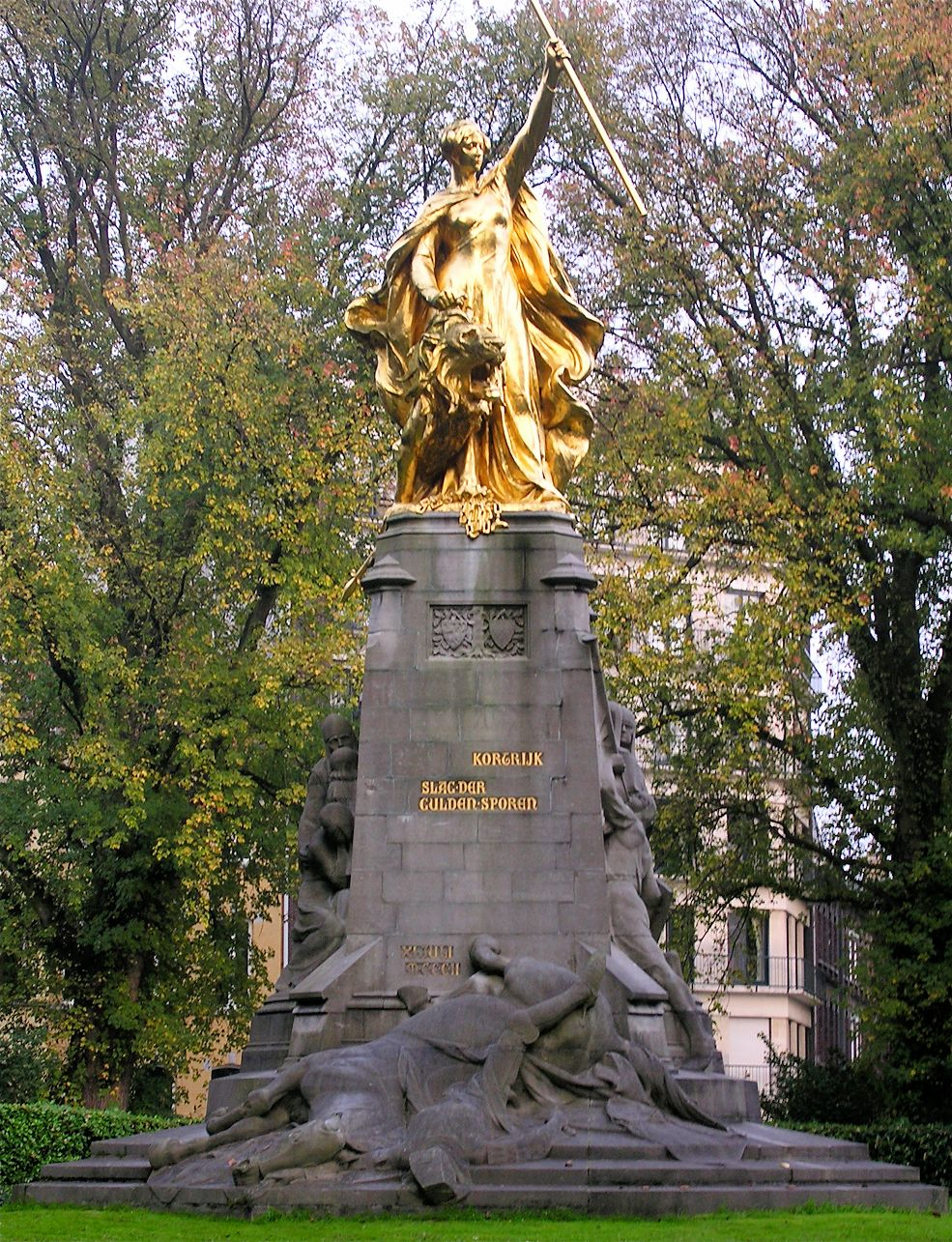
The Groeninge Monument

The Groeninge Monument is a monument in the Belgian city of Kortrijk. The gilded statue was inaugurated to commemorate the 600th anniversary of the Battle of the Golden Spurs. The statue is situated in the Groeningepark, where during the Middle Ages the Groeninge battlefield was situated. In this park one can also find the Groeningegate, a triumphal arch, which gives access to the park.

The Groeninge Monument was designed by sculptor Godfried Devreese. The statue was cast in bronze by the Fonderie Nationale des Bronzes. It was planned to be inaugurated in 1902, but was not ready until 1906, when it was unveiled on 5 August. The gilded statue represents the Virgin of Flanders, who holds aloft a war scythe (around the time of construction there was a lot of confusion with the goedendag) whilst holding in the other the Flemish Lion. The chains of the lion are broken and he looks in the direction of France. The base of the monument depicts three scenes of the battle: grieving for a fallen soldier, the death of count Robert II of Artois fallen next to his horse and the victory. Also visible are the coats of arms of Flanders and Kortrijk.

The inscription reads "KORTRIJK - SLAG DER GULDEN SPOREN XI JULI MCCCII", Dutch for "Kortrijk - Battle of the Golden Spurs XI July MCCCII". The date referenced is 11 July 1302 in Roman numerals, the day the battle took place.
