= Fonderie Nationale des Bronzes =

Artistic studio and foundry

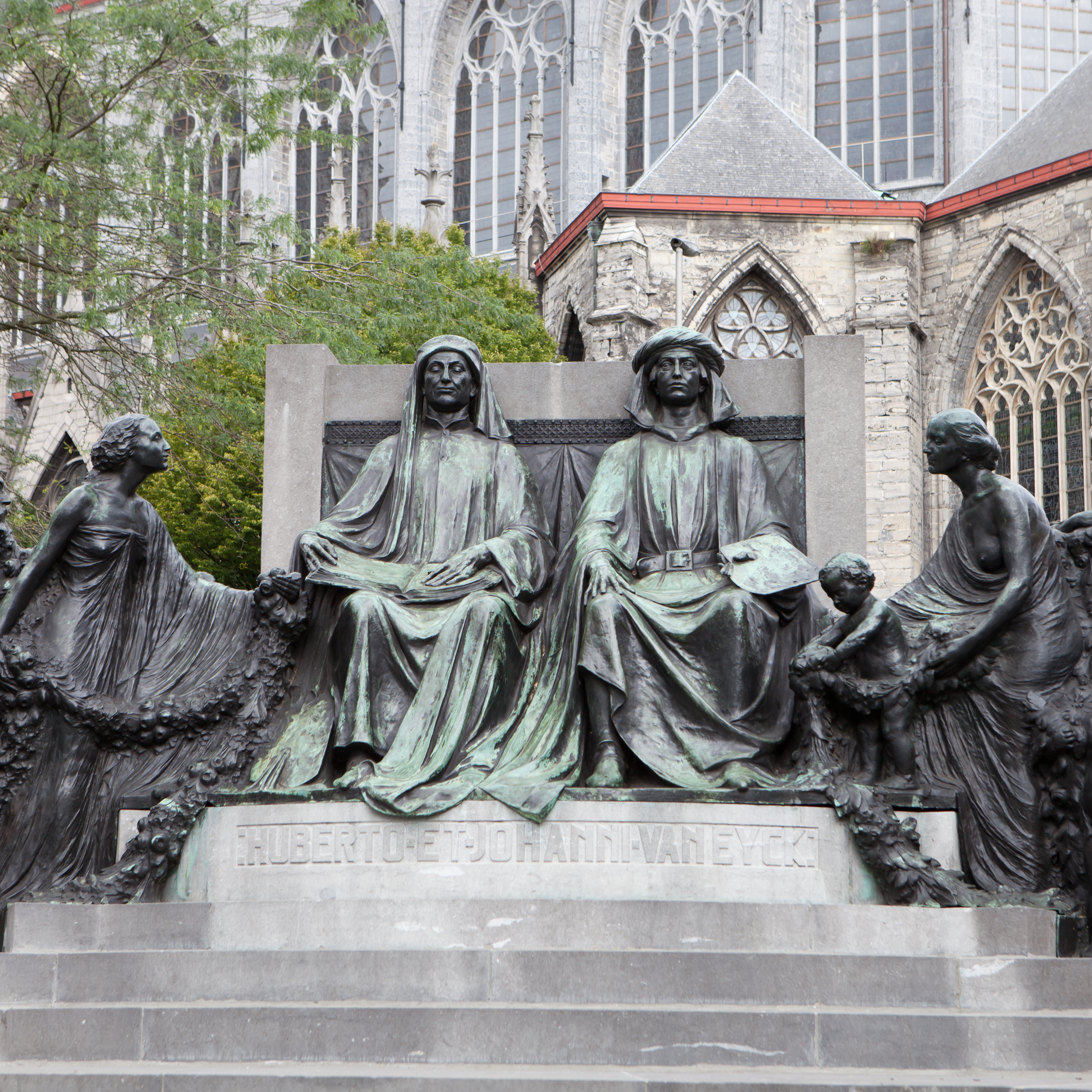
The Van Eyck brothers' memorial, Ghent

Fonderie Nationale des Bronzes (established as J. Petermann fondeur Bruxelles) was a 19th- and 20th-century artistic studio and foundry in Brussels, Belgium, that specialized in bronze sculptures. It became known for casting the works of Auguste Rodin, Rembrandt Bugatti, Paul Delvaux, and many others.

== Works ==
Several works by various artists are located in noted museums around the world, including the Musée d'Orsay in Paris.

- A statue of William the Silent (1920) on the campus of Rutgers University in New Brunswick, New Jersey, cast by Toon Dupuis from a mould by Lodewyk Royer.
