= Toon Dupuis =

Dutch sculptor

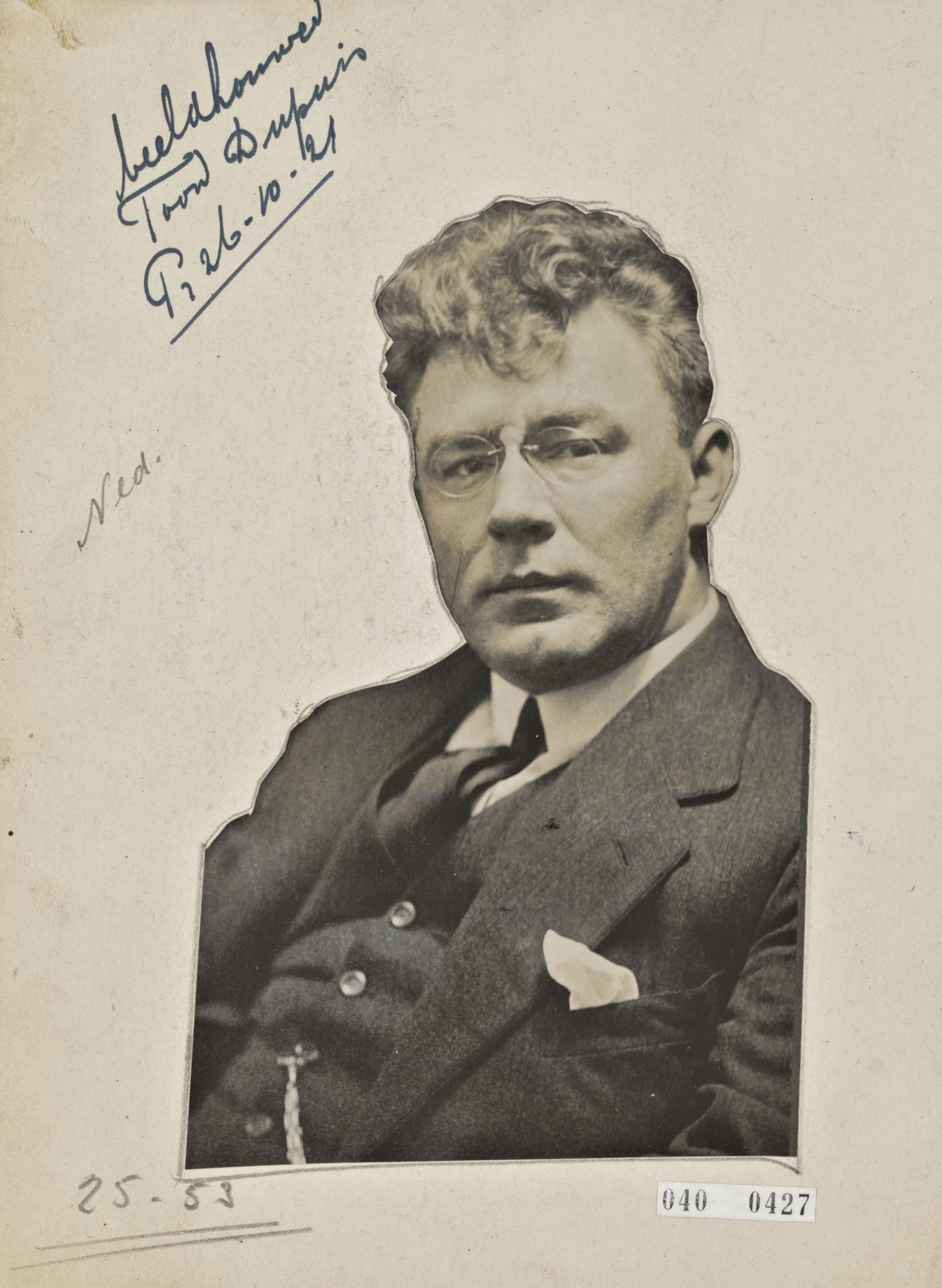
Toon Dupuis

Antonius Stanislaus Nicolaas Ludovicus Dupuis (18 February 1877, Antwerp – 13 October 1937, The Hague) was a Dutch sculptor and medallist of Belgian origin. He's the son of the sculptor Louis Dupuis (1842–1921).

Dupuis was a lecturer at the Koninklijke Academie van Beeldende Kunsten in The Hague. Among his works are a picture of Johannes Zwijsen in the St. Dionysius Church in Tilburg, a statue of Petrus Canisius in the Hunnerpark te Nijmegen, a bust of mgr. Nolens in the Katholiek Documentatie Centrum in Nijmegen and a bust of Jozef Israëls that is in the collection of the Rijksmuseum in Amsterdam. His work was part of the art competitions at the 1928 Summer Olympics and the 1932 Summer Olympics.

== Works in public spaces ==
- Bust of Petrus J.H. Cuypers (1910), Rijksmuseum Amsterdam
- Bust of Victor de Stuers (1914), Rijksmuseum Amsterdam
- Bbust of Jozef Israëls (19..), Rijksmuseum Amsterdam
- William III (1921), Kasteelplein, Breda
- Queen Emma (1936), in the rose garden of Jozef Israel Square. This monument is by Dupuis in collaboration with the architect Co Brandes. The stone monument is in French Vaurion limestone. The statue was damaged by graffiti and cleaning and was replaced in 2001 by a cast copy, The Hague
- Bench in the Clingendael estate, monument in 1932 donated by the city of The Hague
- Johan and Cornelis de Witt (1918), Visbrug, Dordrecht
- Bust of Alexander Frederik de Savornin Lohman (1924), Rijksuniversiteit Groningen, Groningen
- Heilig Hartbeeld (1924), Tempsplein, Heerlen
- Bust of Rembrandt (1906), Wittesingel, Leiden
- H. Petrus Canisius (1927), Nijmegen
- Bust of Nolens (19..), (Catholic Documentation Centre), Nijmegen
- statue of Johannes Zwijsen (1933), Willemsplein, Tilburg
- Bust of the burgemeister Bernardus Reiger (1909), in the Maliebaan/Maliesingel park, Utrecht
- Bas relief of Hendrik Adriaan van Beuningen (19..), public library Oudegracht, Utrecht
- Prof. Franciscus Cornelis Donders (1921), Janskerkhof, Utrecht
- Borstbeeld Petrus Stuyvesant (1911), St. Mark's Church-in-the-Bowery on Second Avenue, New York City
- Statue of William the Silent (1920) erected on Rutgers University's Voorhees Mall in 1928, New Brunswick, New Jersey

== Gallery ==
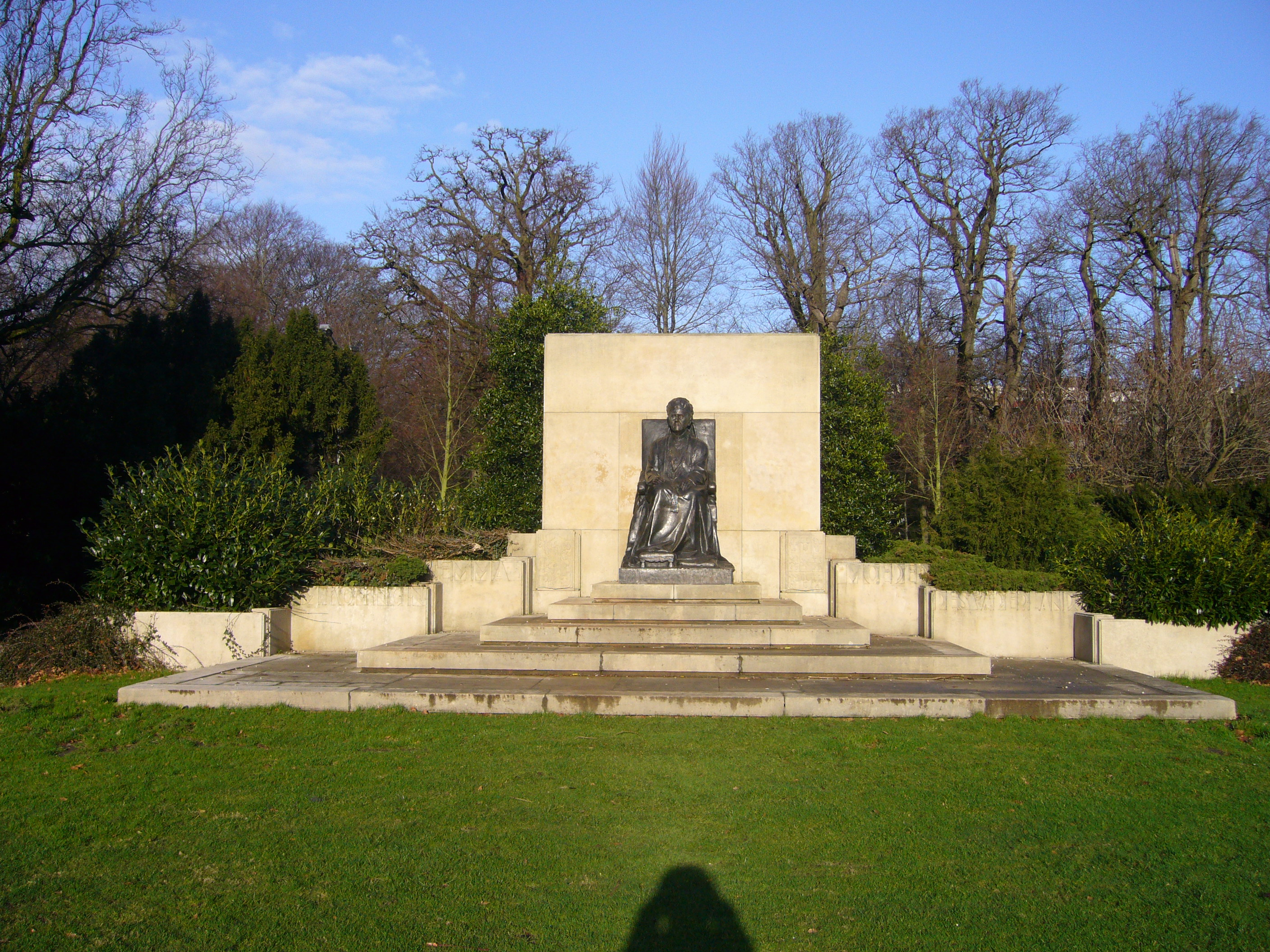
Queen Emma in the rose garden in The Hague

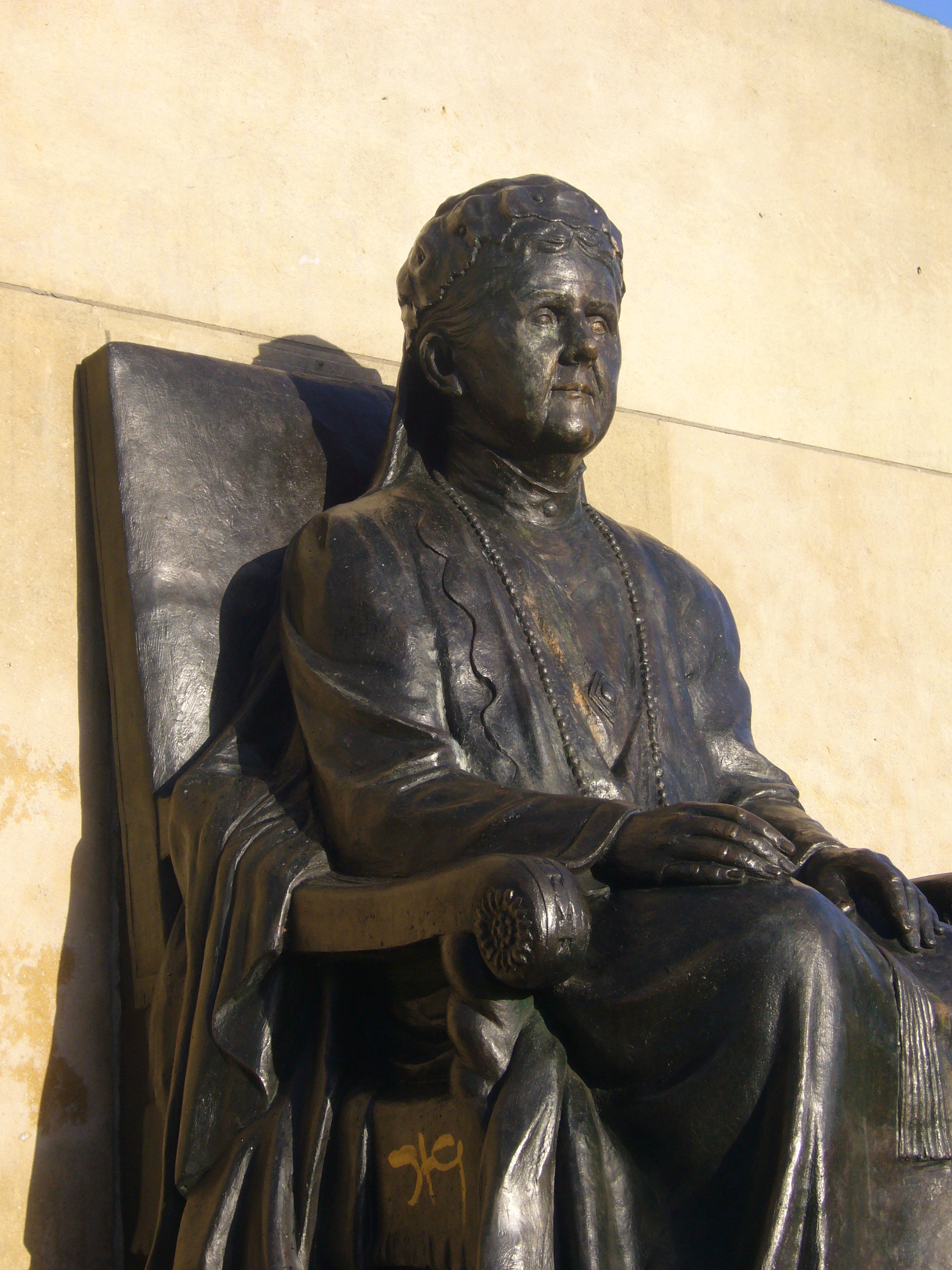
Detail of the monument

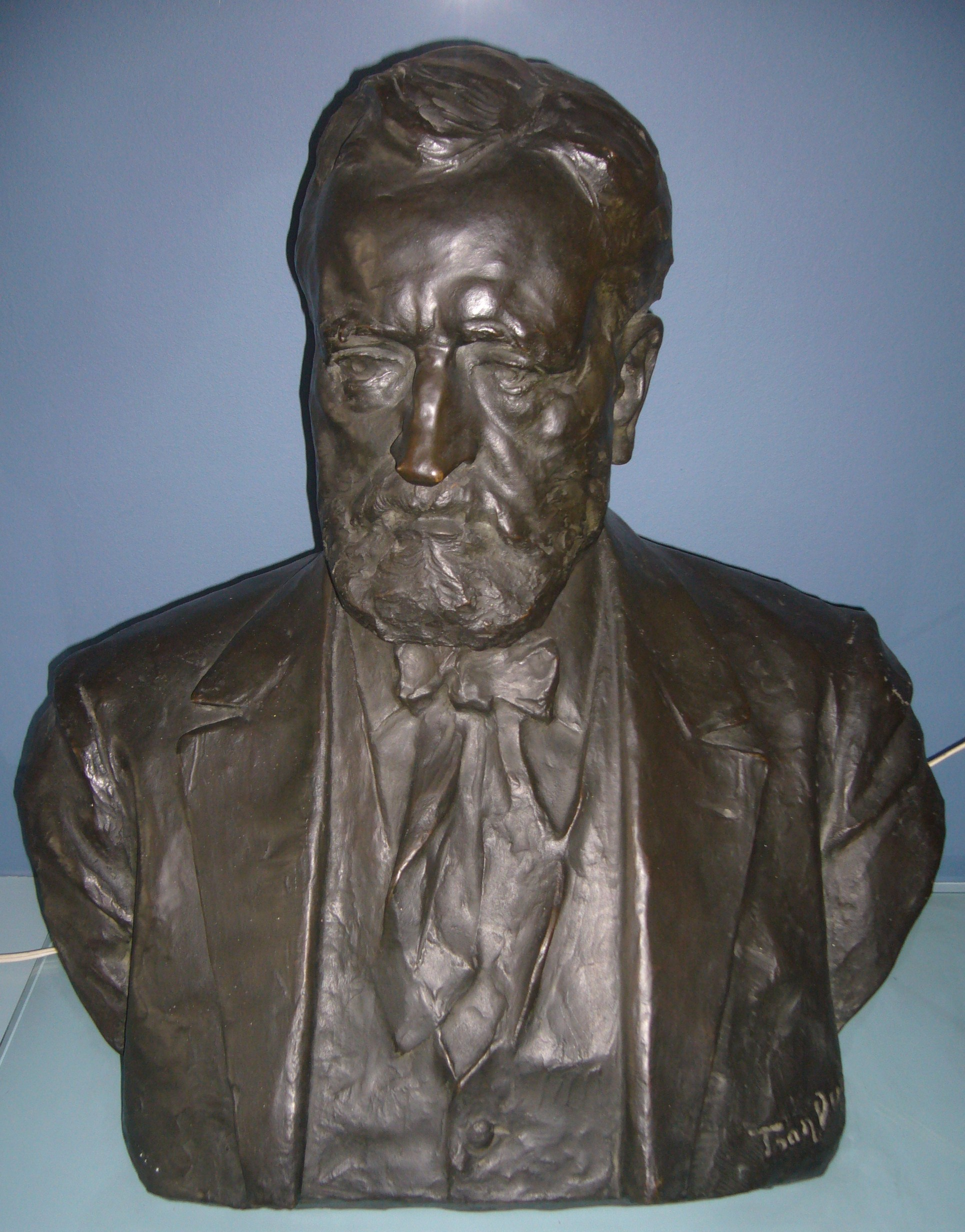
Henrik Pander, 1842–1893

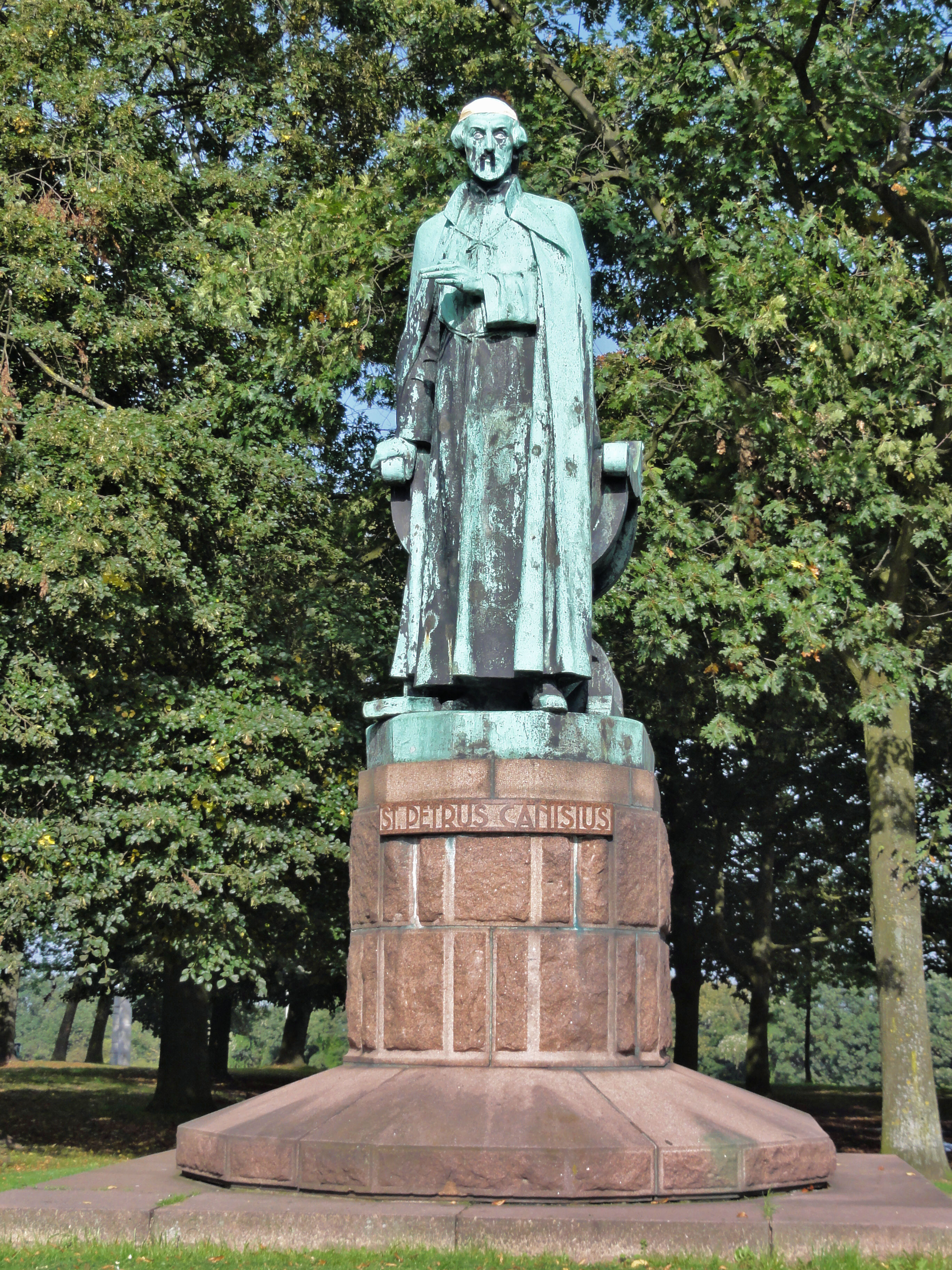
Petrus Canisius in the Hunnerpark in Nijmegen

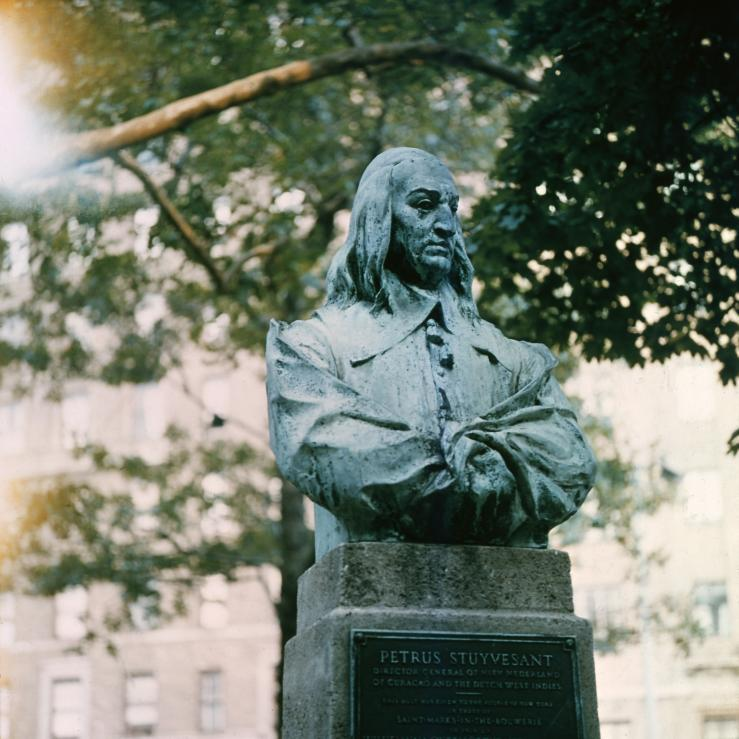
Peter Stuyvesant, Saint Mark's Church in-the-Bowery East Yard

== See also ==
- List of Dutch sculptors
