= Francis Dawson Gallatin =

Francis Dawson Gallatin (1870 – December 23, 1933) was the New York City Parks Commissioner for Manhattan and the Bronx in New York City from 1919 to 1927. A graduate of Columbia College (now University) and Columbia Law School, Gallatin established as career as an attorney in New York City. Gallatin, was the son of Elizabeth Dawson Gallatin and James Gallatin, the president of the Society for Improving the Condition of the Poor and the Tenement House Commission. He was the great-grandson of Albert Gallatin, who served as the Secretary of the Treasury in the presidential administrations of Thomas Jefferson and James Madison and founder of New York University. In 1917 he was the Democratic Party candidate for municipal judge in New York City's municipal court's ninth district. On February 8, 1919, he was appointed Parks Commissioner for the boroughs of Manhattan and the Bronx by Mayor John F. Hylan, and focused on restoring trees in city parks and the preservation of historic buildings and monuments.
