= Pieter de Coninck =

Bruggeling Weaver, known for his role in the Battle of the Golden Spurs

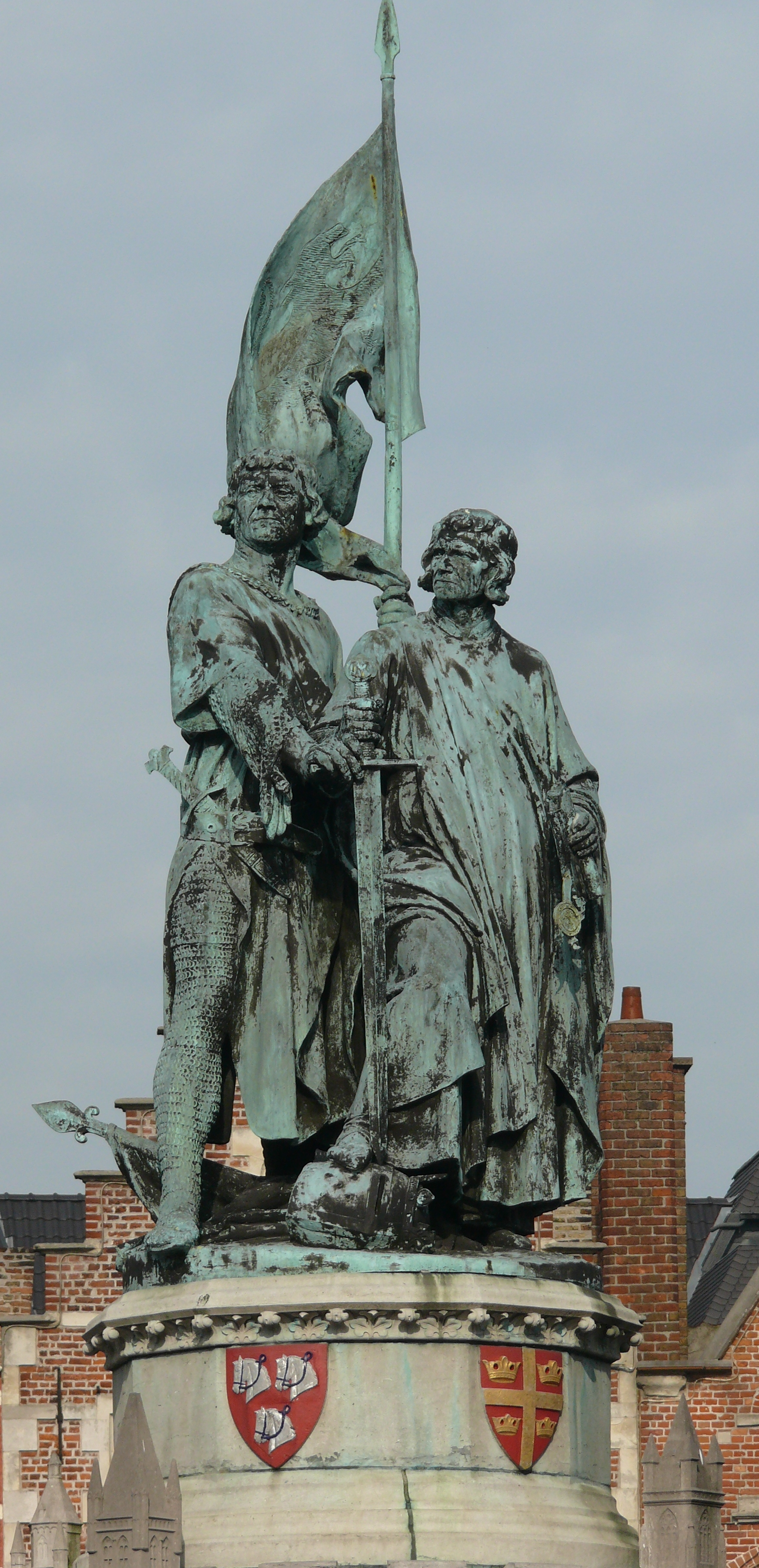
Statue of Jan Breydel and Pieter de Coninck in Bruges, Belgium

Pieter de Coninck (c. 1255 – died 1332 or 1333) was a weaver from Bruges well known for his role in the events surrounding the Battle of the Golden Spurs. He was not the head of the weavers' guild as is popularly believed (mostly because he was portrayed as such in the novel The Lion of Flanders by Hendrik Conscience). Together with Jan Breydel, a butcher, he was in the forefront of the popular uprising that led to the Battle of the Golden Spurs. Right before that battle he was knighted together with two of his sons.

== Biography ==
Before the Battle of the Golden Spurs began he was seen by the city government of Bruges as a dangerous oproerkraaier and was imprisoned in June 1301. He was freed by the people of Bruges. Afterwards, the Leliaarts, a political faction supporting French rule, took over control of the city. Jacques de Châtillon, the then appointed governor of County of Flanders, entered Bruges with a small force and de Coninck was banished.

19th century portrait of de Coninck by Albrecht De Vriendt

Urged on by John I, Marquis of Namur, de Coninck restored his authority in Bruges in December 1301. He tried to align the people of Ghent on the same side but failed. On 1 May 1302, he was one of the leaders of a gang of rebels who took the castle of Sijsele and Male. At Male, the rebels killed the entire French garrison. De Châtillon responded by again marching on Bruges with a force of 800 men, and again expelling de Coninck from the city. De Châtillon marched into the city with his army fully clad and battle-ready (against established agreements with the city magistrates). The people of Bruges, fearing bloody reprisals, and in order to protect themselves, helped de Coninck enter the city with his followers during the night. On 18 May 1302, during the so-called Bruges Matins (Brugse Metten), nearly all the French present in Bruges and their Leliaart supporters were killed. De Châtillon barely managed to escape.

After the Bruges Matins, de Coninck was one of the leaders of the Bruges militia that cleared the coastal area from Leliaart insurgents and French stragglers. After they failed to take the besieged castle of Cassel, they marched onto Kortrijk (Courtrai) where a Flemish makeshift army was gathering to stop a French army under the command of Robert II of Artois. This battle, won by a motley alliance of Flemish and Namur petty nobles and many commoners, was later famously called the Battle of the Golden Spurs.

In 1309, together with Jan Breydel and Jan Heem, he led a new uprising in Bruges, this time against the adverse effects (for Flanders) of the peace of Athis-sur-Orge (1305). In 1321 he again took part in an uprising in Bruges. As a punishment, all his possessions were confiscated and sold.

== Personal life ==
Pieter de Coninck was married twice. He died in 1332 or 1333. Together with Jan Breydel he has a monument by Paul de Vigne on the Markt of Bruges. It was originally unveiled in July 1887 in a local ceremony, followed by a formal opening that August by King Leopold II.
