= Women in the Crusades =

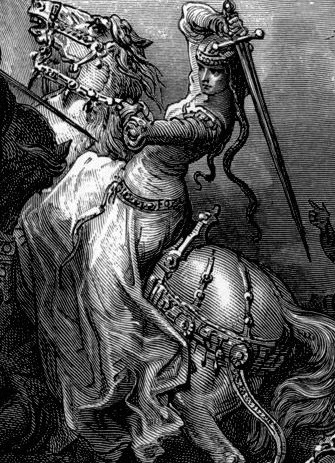
Portrait of Florine of Burgundy, one of the women who reportedly fought in the crusades.

Although women's contributions to the crusades have historically been under-appreciated, recent scholarship has highlighted their indispensable contributions to the war efforts. Women from all social strata participated in the crusades, with or without taking the cross formally (as crucesignatae).

A significant portion of women involved with the crusades traveled with their husbands or families. Often times, such accompaniment was a means to avoid destitution. In other cases, women followed their employers. Piety and spiritual reward also motivated many crusaders, men and women. Helen J. Nicholson stresses the non-straightforward character of crusader's motivations in her work Women and the Crusades.

Women participating in the crusades faced many of the same expeditionary risks as their male counterparts: disease, abuse, captivity, enslavement, and death. Although cultural norms generally precluded women from active military combat (barring emergencies), they nonetheless served important logistical and support roles: herding livestock, loading crossbows, preparing munitions, and boiling water, as well as washing clothes and removing lice from soldiers. Noblewomen, possessing social and financial leverage unavailable to commonfolk, served as important campaigners, providing diplomatic support and mustering armies to the front.

During the First Crusade, "washerwoman" was the only role for crusading women permitted by the Catholic Church, as long as they were unattractive, for fear that the troops would engage with them in sexual relations. However, this stipulation was typically not obeyed, and all types and classes of women took part in the Crusades. Every time an army marched, several women would join them as sutlers or servants, as well as prostitutes. Unmentioned in victory, they took the blame for defeat and were purged from campaigns several times throughout the Crusades, for relations with them were considered sinful among soldiers who had left their homelands to fight a holy cause and were supposed to be pure in thought and deed. Numerous nuns also accompanied the religious men, namely priests and bishops, that traveled as part of the quests, while other women took up arms against their Muslim foes.

The inclusion of women in the chronicles was less common whose focus was more male-dominated. Mentions of female Crusaders are more commonly found in Muslim accounts of the Crusades, as the aggressiveness of Christian women was often seen as a way for Muslims to demonstrate how ruthless and depraved their foes could be. During the later Crusades, many women whose stories remain were from the Middle East region, including one of a Muslim woman who fought the Crusaders.

== Contemporaneous historians ==
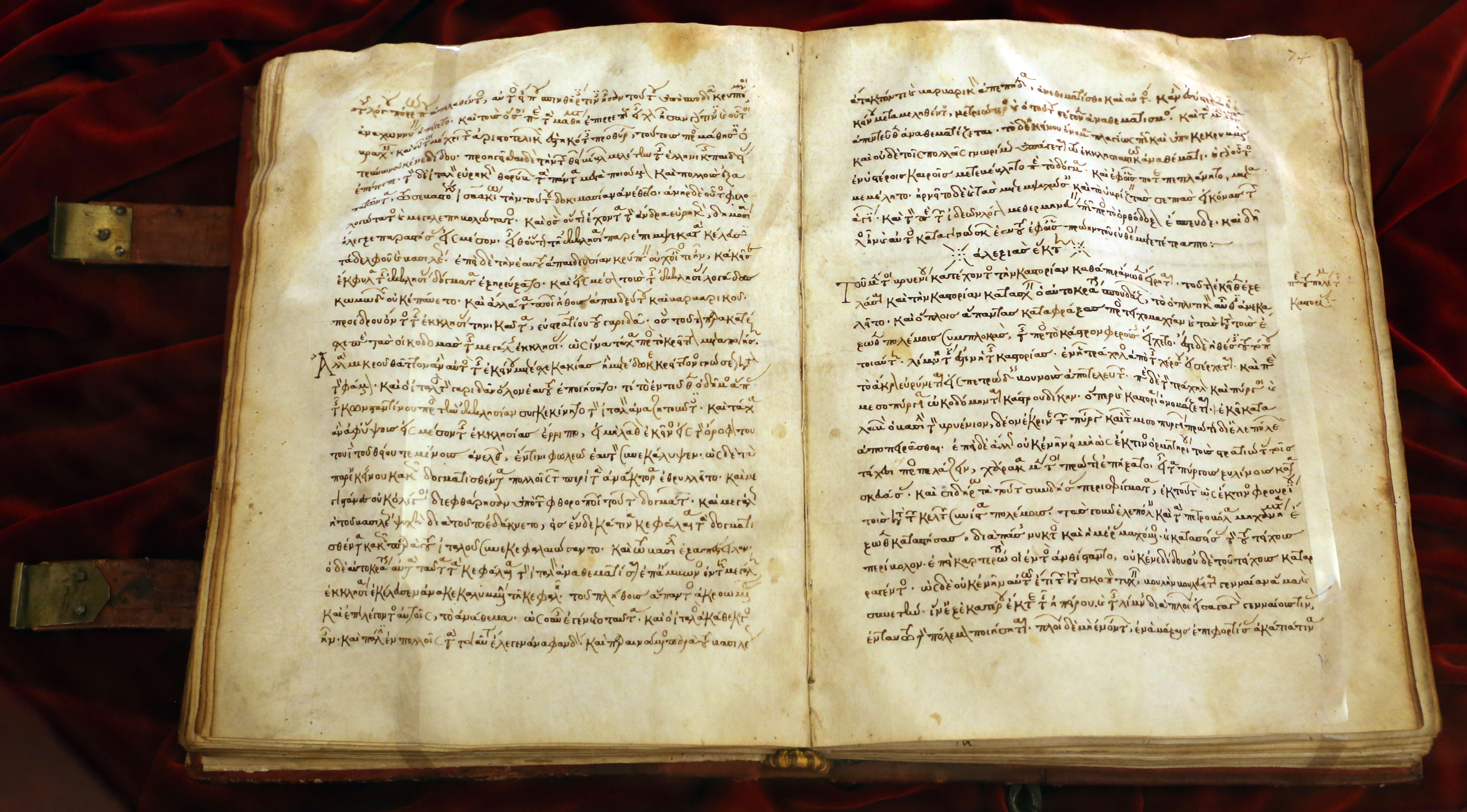
The Alexiad by Anna Komnene

The story of women in the Crusades begins with Anna Komnene, the daughter of Byzantine Emperor Alexios I Komnenos. She wrote a history of the First Crusade in the Alexiad, providing a view of the campaign from the Byzantine perspective. She was exiled to a monastery before the work could be finished.

The challenges faced by women of the Crusades can be summarized by writings by Fulcher of Chartres, chaplain of Baldwin I of Jerusalem, who states:

Then the Franks, having again consulted together, expelled the women from the army, the married as well as the unmarried, lest perhaps defiled by the sordidness of riotous living should displease the Lord. These women then sought shelter for themselves in neighboring towns.

Fulcher notes that mass hysteria had surrounded the holy quest of the Crusades, demonstrated by the belief that even a lowly waterfowl led by a nun [see below], had been blessed by the Holy Spirit and would lead them to Jerusalem.

== Nuns ==
A large number of nuns are believed to have traveled to the Holy Land during the Crusades, but only three are known from the First Crusade, and only one is named. (Note that Riley-Smith uses the term "anonyma" to refer to a woman of unknown name.)

- Anonyma of Cambrai, the religious leader of a sect traveling with Count Emicho of Flonheim, who believed her goose to be filled with the Holy Spirit, even going so far as to allow the spirit-filled animal to direct the sect's course. The sect was not heard of again after the goose died. This story is reported by Fulcher and Albert of Aix. Gulbert of Nogent suggests that the goose may then have been served as a holiday meal.
- Anonyma, nun of the monastery of Santa Maria and Correa, Trier, who as part of the People's Crusade was taken by the Muslims during the Battle of Civetot that devastated the force of Peter the Hermit, who had returned to Constantinople for supplies. When she was liberated in 1097, she apparently eloped with her Turkish captor.
- Americas, a nun of Altejas, who, following the direction Pope Urban II, went to her bishop for his blessing to found a hospice for the poor in the Holy Land.

== Wives ==
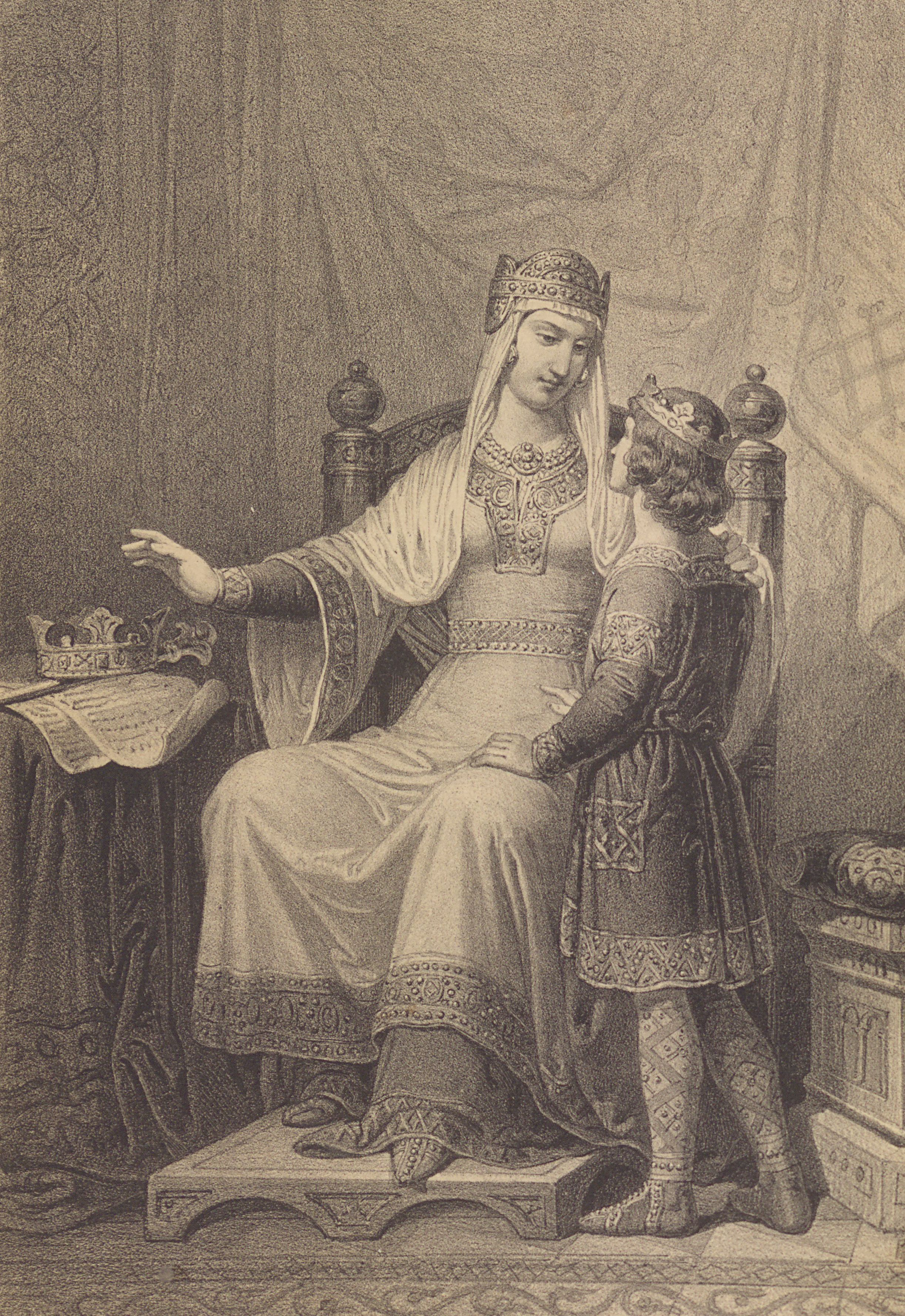
1868 portrait of Elvira of Leon-Castile

According to Riley-Smith, there were seven of the wives of the first Crusaders that accompanied their husbands to the Holy Land. An eighth participated in the 1107 battles of Bohemond of Antioch-Tatanto against the Byzantine Empire (sometimes referred to as a crusade). They were as follows.

- Anonyma of Lèves accompanied her husband Ralph the Red of Pont-Echanfray, in the Crusade of Bohemond of Antioch-Taranto, 1107–1108. She was the daughter of Odeline of Le Puiset and Joscelin of Lèves, and so was the cousin of Humberge of Le Puiset. Ralph was knight of Bohemond's father Robert Guiscard. Ralph died in the White Ship disaster of 1120.Edith, daughter of William de Warenne, 1st Earl of Surrey, accompanied her husband Gerard of Gournay-en-Bray with both the armies of Hugh the Great and Robert Curthose. Their son Hugh II fought in the Second Crusade.
- Corba of Thorigne, wife of Geoffrey Burel, Lord of Amboise, participated in the Crusade of 1101. Corba was captured by the Turks, and her ultimate fate is unknown.
- Elvira of Leon-Castile, illegitimate daughter of King Alfonso VI of León and Castile, who traveled while pregnant with her husband Raymond IV of St. Gilles, Count of Toulouse. After Raymond was killed at the siege of Tripoli in 1106, she gave birth to their son Alfonso Jordan, later Count of Toulouse, and then returned home to Castile. There she married Fernando Fernández de Carrión and had three additional children.
- Emeline accompanied her husband Fulcher of Bouillon, a knight in the army of Godfrey of Bouillon, who was captured and beheaded during the siege of Antioch. She was captured, taken to Azaz and married to a Turkish mercenary.
- Emma of Hereford, Countess of Norfolk, traveled with her husband Ralph I of Gael, a Breton leader first under Robert Curthose and then with Bohemund I of Antioch during the siege of Nicaea. Emma's parents were William Fitz-Osbern and Adeliza (daughter of Roger I of Tosny), and so she was cousin to Baldwin's wife Godehilde. Both Emma and her husband died en route to Jerusalem.
- Florine of Burgundy was a warrior-princess who accompanied her husband Sweyn the Crusader, Prince of Denmark in the First Crusade. Florine was the daughter of Odo I, Duke of Burgundy, and his wife Sybilla. Florine and Sweyn commanded a force of 1,500 cavalries progressing across the plains of Cappadocia when they were ambushed by an overwhelming Turkish force. Both were killed along with most of their force.
- Godehilde, daughter of Raoul II of Tosny, Seigneur de Conches-en-Ouche, who accompanied her husband Baldwin I of Jerusalem, as well as a contingent of their household. While he was marching to Cilicia, she fell ill and died in Kahramanmaraş, depriving him of the funding from her lands. He later entered into bigamous marriages with the Armenian Arda, whom he abandoned, and Adelaide del Vasto.
- Hadvide, daughter of Arnold I, Count of Chiny, who accompanied her husband Dodo of Cons, a confidant of Godfrey of Bouillon. Both Hadvide and Dodo returned home following their crusade.
- Helie of Burgundy accompanied her husband Bertrand of Toulouse in his quest to claim the role of Count of Tripoli.
- Humberge of Le Puiset traveled with her husband Walo II of Chaumont-en-Vexin. Humberge was the sister of the Crusader Everard III of Le Puiset, Viscount of Chartres, and daughter of Hugues "Blavons" de Bretenil and Alix de Montlhéry (daughter of Guy I of Montlhéry). Walo was killed during the siege of Antioch in 1098, but it remains unclear as to the fate of Humberge. Their son Drogo was also prominent in the First Crusade.
- Mabel of Roucy accompanied her husband Hugh I of Jaffa to the Holy Land.
- Ismat ad-Din Khatun - Turkic Muslim regent of Damascus; Zengid and then Ayyubid queen; known in Western sources as "Asimat." The daughter of the regent of Damascus, she would be the wife of first Nur ad-Din Zengi, and then Saladin. She would exercise considerable power under both regimes, and rule briefly in her own right in 1174. In 1174, Nur ad-Din died without an heir. King Almaric of Jerusalem sought to take advantage of the situation, invading his emirate and laying siege to Banias. Ismat ad-Din acted as regent during this time, governing Damascus and negotiating a victorious peace with Almaric. For this, chronicler William of Tyre described her as exercising "courage beyond that of most women.". Also in 1174, Nur ad-Din's general Saladin was crowned Sultan of Egypt, and claimed Syria as Nur ad-Din's successor. He legitimised this claim by marrying Ismat ad-Din, Nur ad-Din's widow and Damascus's regent, later in 1174.

== Warriors ==
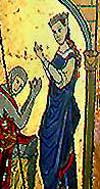
Portrait of Melisende of Jerusalem

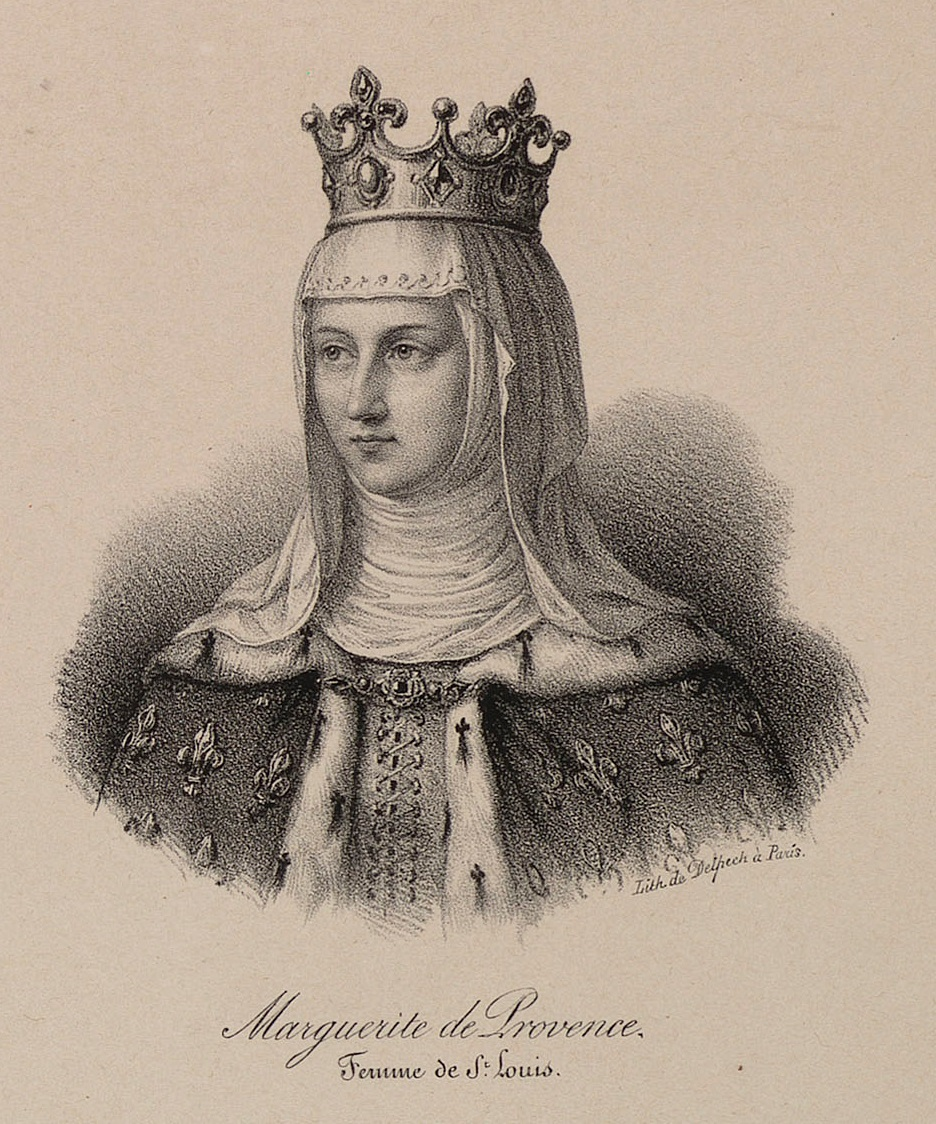
Portrait of Margaret of Provence

Numerous women took the cross and battled the Muslims, some with their husbands, some without; numerous royal women fought as Crusaders, and at least one against them.

- Cecilia of Le Bourcq, Lady of Tarsus, sister of Baldwin II of Jerusalem and wife of Roger of Salerno, prince-regent of Antioch. Cecilia helped organize the defenses of Antioch in the Muslim attacks of 1119 in which her husband was killed.
- Eleanor of Aquitaine, queen consort of the Franks. Eleanor accompanied her husband Louis VII on the Second Crusade as the leader of the soldiers from the Duchy of Aquitaine, which included some of her royal ladies-in-waiting. The crusade accomplished little, and the disagreements on strategy between the king and queen eventually led to the annulment of their marriage. Her subsequent marriage to Henry II of England produced a son, Richard the Lionheart. After becoming king, Richard led the English contingent in the Third Crusade, with Eleanor serving as regent in his absence.
- Ermengard of Anjou, divorced wife of William IX of Aquitaine and daughter of Fulk IV of Anjou, who went on an unspecified crusade after 1118.
- Florine of Burgundy, detailed above.
- Ida of Formbach-Ratelnbert (Ida of Cham), widow of Leopold II, Margrave of Austria. During the Crusade of 1101, she led an army marching towards Jerusalem. They were ambushed at Heraclea Cybistra by Kilij Arslan I and, depending on the source, she was either killed or carried off to his harem.
- Margaret of Beverley, English commoner who took part in the Siege of Jerusalem in 1187.
- Margaret of Provence, queen consort of France. Margaret accompanied her husband Louis IX and sister Beatrice on the Seventh Crusade. After Louis' capture, she led the negotiations for his release and, in fact, was the only woman to ever lead a Crusade, if however briefly. Her bravery and decisiveness were chronicled by her contemporary, Jean de Joinville.
- Melisende, Queen of Jerusalem, daughter of Baldwin II of Jerusalem. As ruler of Jerusalem after her father's death, she sent an army to aid the County of Edessa which was under siege and eventually fell. Her pleas to Pope Eugene III for help led to the disastrous Second Crusade.
- Shajar al-Durr, Sultan of Egypt during the Seventh Crusade. As wife of sultan As-Salih Ayyub, who had become gravely ill, Shajar helped organize the defenses of Egypt. After As-Salih's death, the army supported her in becoming the first female sultan. Shajar's forces defeated Louis IX of France at the Battle of Mansurah. The Caliph al-Musta'sim in Baghdad refused to allow her the throne and installed the Mamluk Izz al-Din Aybak in her place. Shajar married Aybak and ruled with him for seven years. Unsure of her position, Shajar had him murdered by her servants; subsequently, she was stripped and beaten to death by the servants of Aybak's 15-year-old son and former wife. Thrown naked from the top of the Red Tower, she lay in the surrounding moat for three days until finally being buried in a tomb near the Mosque of Ibn Tulun.

== Others ==
The stories of numerous other women who played a role in the Crusades have been documented.

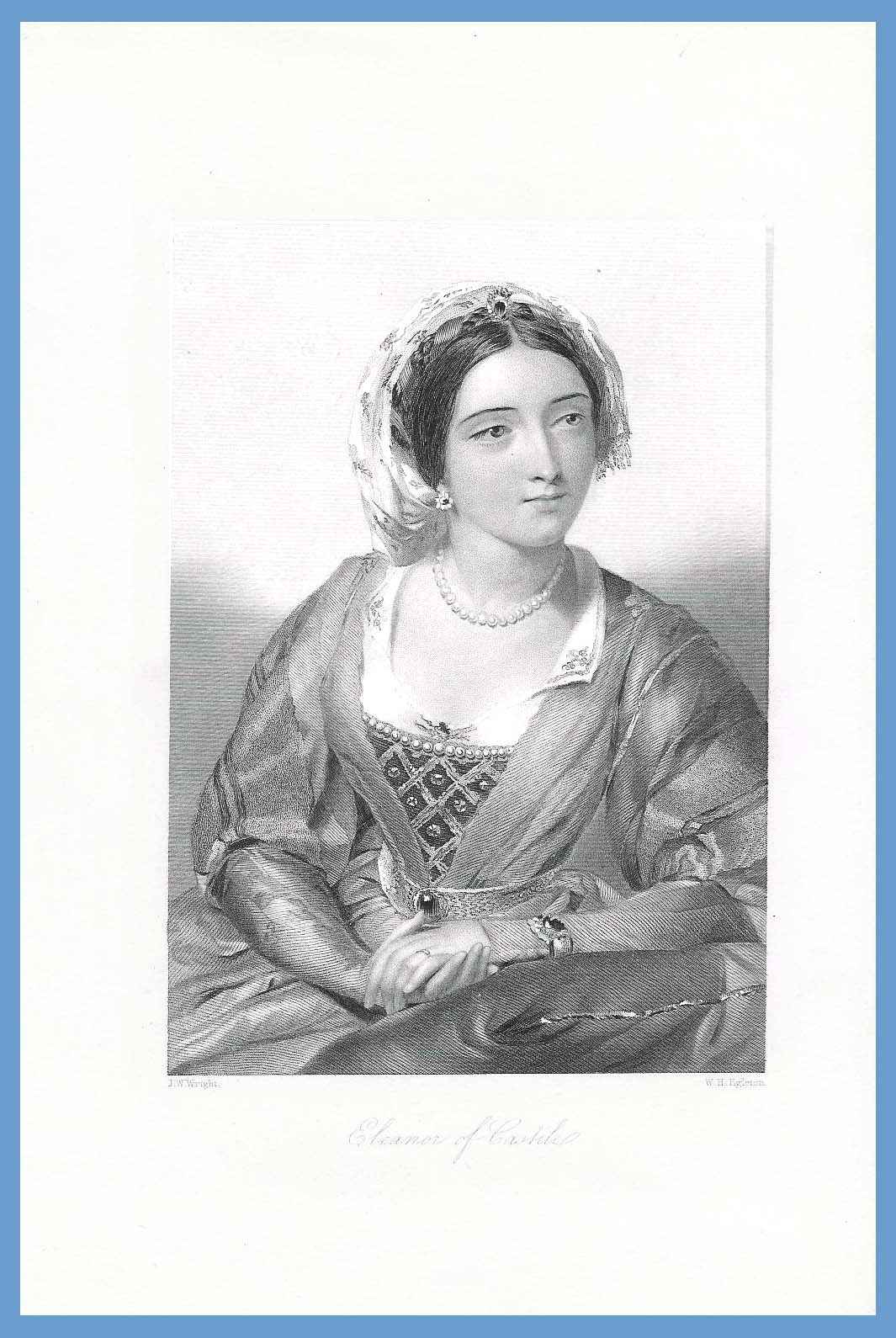
Portrait of Eleanor of Castile

- Isabella I, queen regnant of Jerusalem during the Third Crusade.
- Eudokia Angelina, first consort of Stefan the First-Crowned of Serbia and later the mistress of Alexios V Doukas, with whom she fled Constantinople during the Fourth Crusade.
- Euphrosyne Doukaina Kamatera, wife of Emperor Alexios III Angelos, left behind in Constantinople as her husband fled during the Fourth Crusade.
- Margaret of Hungary, daughter of Béla III of Hungary, first married to Emperor Isaac II Angelos and then to Boniface of Montferrat, leader of the Fourth Crusade.
- Maria of Antioch-Armenia, Lady of Toron, a major Crusader castle in Lebanon when, at the end of the Sixth Crusade, land taken by Saladin was returned to Armenia.
- Eleanor of Castile accompanied her husband Edward I of England on the Eighth Crusade and gave birth to their daughter Joan of Acre in the Holy Land.
- Isabella of Aragon, queen consort of France, accompanied her husband Philip III of France on the Eighth Crusade.
- Alice of Jerusalem, princess consort of Antioch.
- Constance of Antioch, princess of Antioch.
- Lucia of Tripoli, the last countess of Tripoli.
- The Bacıyân-ı Rûm (literally Sisters of Rûm) were a supposed all-female militia organisation, who existed alongside other Ghazi and Akhi orders during the late Anatolian beyliks period. They appear only briefly in the historical record - in the 15th century, Aşıkpaşazade names them in a list of Akhi societies; and in the 13th century, Bertrandon de la Broquière mentions that there was a Turkoman militia in the Beylik of Dulkadir made up entirely of women. It is disputed by modern historians if such an organisation actually existed, and if it had any military character. Modern historians such as Franz Taeschner and Zeki Velidi Togan have suggested that, in Aşıkpaşazade's history, the word "bâciyân" (sisters) was a misspelling of another word (perhaps "hajiyan" (pilgrims) or bahşiyân (clerks)). However, Mehmet Fuat Köprülü argued that such an organisation might have existed - female initiates into Sufi orders (such as the Bektashi) were given the title of "bacı" ("sister"), just as male initiates were given the title of "akhi (brother).

== Regents of the estates of the Crusaders ==
While the men of the Crusades died in frequent battles, the women lived in comparative freedom. They lived long lives and acted as regents to their estates and young children. As widows, they held a degree of independence that they had previously lacked, allowing them control over their own property, the opportunity to preside over courts and trade meetings, and fulfilling obligations of military and political service, in direct contravention of European gender norms of the period. As more property became concentrated in their hands it became obvious that women constituted one of the main sources of "continuity" in the Frankish Levant.

For many women in the Frankish Levant, marriage was a way for them to advance both socially and financially, allowing them to move up in status with their husband when he was alive and then prosper even more by inheriting more land if the husband died. For instance, Agnes of Courtenay, originally a noblewoman of Edessa, remarried multiple times, and by the time of her death in 1186 was "... the first lady in the kingdom (of Jerusalem), wife of the Lord of Sidon, dowager lady of Ramla and Lady of Toron in her own right." As a result of these frequent remarriages, widowed princesses and countesses carried the substantial estates to their next husbands and became seen as a prize, with various European men leaving their homes for a landed wife in the Levant. According to the courts of Outremer, half to a third of the assets of the deceased went to the widow, while the other portion was held in reserve for his children or heirs.

This system had dramatic consequences for both the Frankish Levant and Europe. In Europe, land was mainly transferred through primogeniture during this period, making the power structure more fixed, with dowries becoming more money-based in an effort to keep land in the family. In comparison, Outremer lands were often reverted to the Crown before there was a chance for nobles to establish their own dynasties before they died, allowing the Crown to retain a higher degree of control than in Europe.

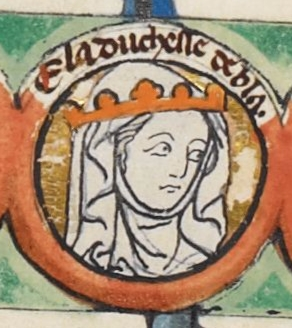
Portrait of Adela of Normandy

Here is a partial list of those who stayed behind to manage the estates as their husbands took the cross.

- Adelaide, Countess of Vermandois, was daughter of Herbert IV, Count of Vermandois and Adele of Valois, and married to renowned Crusader Hugh the Great, Count of Vermandois, a title granted by right of his wife (jure uxoris). Hugh fought in the First Crusade and then in the minor Crusade of 1101, where he was wounded by the Turks and died that October. She was the last member of the Carolingian dynasty.
- Adelaide del Vasto, the third wife of Baldwin I of Jerusalem, married apparently while he was still married to Arda. Adelaide's son Roger II of Sicily by her first marriage refused to support the Crusader states during the Second Crusade because of the treatment of his mother by Jerusalem.
- Adela of Normandy, daughter of William the Conqueror, married to Stephen II, Count of Blois, half-brother to Hugh I, Count of Troyes. After Stephen's death in the minor Crusade of 1102, Adela became the regent of Stephen's estate, and Constance of France served in her court. Among the children of Adela and Stephen were the future King of England, Stephen.
- Adèle of Marie and Sibyl of Château-Porcien, were both married to the scandalous Enguerrand I, Lord of Coucy. Adèle was granddaughter to Gilbert, Count of Roucy. Enguerrand repudiated Adèle on the grounds of adultery, with the blessing of Elinand, Bishop of Laon, and then kidnapped Sibyl who was at the time married to Godfrey I, Count of Namur. The kidnapped Sibyl was pregnant with Enguerrand's child, Agnès de Coucy. Sibyl, in her favor, was the great-grandmother of Robert of Thourotte, Bishop of Langres and Liège. Both Enguerrand and Thomas, his son by Adèle, while bitter enemies and rivals, both took the cross and fought in the First Crusade. Thomas succeeded his father as Lord of Coucy upon his death.
- Arda of Armenia, the second wife of Baldwin I of Jerusalem following the death of Godehilde and the first queen consort of the Kingdom of Jerusalem. This was a politically convenient marriage that allowed Baldwin to become the first Count of Edessa.
- Clementia of Burgundy, wife of Robert II, Count of Flanders.
- Gertrud de Louvain, daughter of Henry III, Count of Louvain, and Gertrude of Flanders, Duchess of Lorraine, was married to Lambert, Count of Montaigu, who played a major role in the First Crusade along with his father Conan and brother Gozelo.
- Hildegarde, daughter of Aimery IV of Thouars, a proven companion of William the Conqueror, was married to Hugh VI "the Devil" of Lusignan, who took the cross along with his brothers Raymond IV, Count of Toulouse, a leader of the First Crusade, and Berenguer Ramon II, Count of Barcelona.
- Hodierna, daughter of Hugh I, Count of Rethel, was married to Héribrand III, Lord of Hierges, and was regent of his estates during his absence during the First Crusade. Her brother was Baldwin II, King of Jerusalem. She secondly married Roger of Salerno, Prince of Antioch.
- Ida of Leuven, daughter of Henry II, Count of Leuven and sister of Godfrey I of Leuven, was married to Baldwin II, Count of Hainaut, who served in the First Crusade with Godfrey of Bouillon. When her husband had vanished, Ida organized a search in the Holy Land to find him, but her efforts were to no avail as he had clearly died.
- Constance of France, Princess of Antioch, daughter of Philip I of France and Bertha of Holland. She accompanied her husband Bohemond I to Apulia, where she gave birth to Bohemond II, Prince of Antioch. After her husband's death, she served as regent for her son.
- Ermengarde of Anjou, daughter of Fulk IV, Count of Anjou, married to Alan IV, Duke of Brittany. She served as regent of Brittany in her husband's absence on the First Crusade and possibly went to Palestine, likely on the Second Crusade.
- Estefania, daughter of Ramon Berenguer III, Count of Barcelona, and aunt to Constance, Queen of France. Estefania was married to Centule II, Count of Bigorre, whose successes in the First Crusade were minor, but played a major role in breaking the feudal connection with France.
- Marguerite of Clermont, daughter of Renaud II, Count of Clermont-en-Beauvaisis (a member of the Crusader Army of Hugh the Great), was married to Charles the Good, Count of Flanders, a Crusader who was offered the crown of Jerusalem but refused. Later, Charles was hacked to death while in prayer in Bruges, Belgium, by rival knights.
- Mary of Scotland, daughter of Malcolm III, King of the Scots, married to Eustace III, Count of Boulogne, the brother of Godfrey of Bouillon. Eustace distinguished himself numerous times as a Crusader and returned unscathed to his estates. Their daughter Matilda was Queen consort of England, as wife of Stephen of England.
- Morphia of Melitene, wife of Baldwin II, King of Jerusalem. She was mother of Melisende, Queen of Jerusalem, discussed above.
- Talesa of Aragon, daughter of Sancho Ramírez, Count of Ribagorza, and therefore granddaughter of Ramiro I, the first King of Aragon. Talesa was married to Gaston IV "le Croisé", Viscount of Béarn, and acted as regent for him and, after his death, for their son Centule VI after Gaston's death in 1131. Their descendants Gaston VI and Gaston VII were participants in later crusades.

== Bibliography ==
- Bennett, Matthew. "Military Masculinity in England and northern france c. 1050–c. 1225." in Masculinity in medieval Europe (Routledge, 2015) pp. 81–98.
- Bom, M. Women in the Military Orders of the Crusades (Springer, 2012).
- Caspi-Reisfeld, Keren. "Women Warriors during the Crusades." in Gendering the Crusades (2002): 94+.
- Clare, Israel Smith, and Tyler, Moses V., (1898). The Library of Universal History, Volume V: The Later Middle Ages, Union Book Company, New York, 1898, pp. 1568–1586
- Durant, Will (1950). The Story of Civilization, Volume IV: The Age of Faith, Simon & Schuster, New York, pp. 585–613
- Garland, Lynda, ed. (2006). Byzantine Women: Varieties of Experience, 800-1200, Ashgate Publishing, Farnham, United Kingdom.
- Hodgson, Natasha (2006). "Women and the Crusades" in Alan V. Murray The Crusades—An Encyclopedia , ABC-CLIO, Santa Barbara, 2006, pp. 1285–1291.
- Hodgson, Natasha (2007). Women, Crusading and the Holy Land in Historical Narrative, Boydell Press.
- McLaughlin, Megan. "The woman warrior: gender, warfare and society in medieval Europe" Women's Studies –an Interdisciplinary Journal, 17 (1990), 193–209.
- Maier, Christoph T. "The roles of women in the crusade movement: a survey." Journal of Medieval History 30.1 (2004): 61-82 online.
- Mazeika, Rasa. " 'Nowhere was the Fragility of their Sex Apparent': Women Warriors in the Baltic Crusade Chronicles", in From Clermont to Jerusalem: The Crusades and Crusader Societies, 1095-1500, ed. Alan V. Murray (Turnhout, 1998), pp. 229–48
- Nicholson, Helen J. (2016). "La Damoisele del chastel": Women's Role in the Defence and Functioning of Castles in Medieval Writing from the Twelfth to the Fourteenth Centuries, in Crusader Landscapes in the Medieval Levant, University of Wales Press, pp. 387–402.
- Nicholson, Helen J. "Women and the Crusades." Hereford Historical Association (2008): 24+ online
- Nicholson, Helen J. "Women on the Third Crusade", Journal of Medieval History, 23 (1997), 335-49 online
- Nicholson, Helen J. (2023). Women and the Crusades. Oxford University Press.
- Poor, Sara, and Jana Schulman, eds. Women and the Medieval Epic: Gender, Genre, and the Limits of Epic Masculinity (Springer, 2016).
- Riley-Smith, Jonathan (1998). The First Crusaders, 1095–1131. Cambridge University Press.
- Riley-Smith, Jonathan, et al. A Database of Crusaders to the Holy Land, 1095-1149.
- Stock, Lorraine Kochanske. "'Arms and the (Wo) man' in Medieval Romance: The Gendered Arming of Female Warriors in the 'Roman d'Eneas' and Heldris's 'Roman de Silence'". Arthuriana (1995): 56-83 online.
