= Flavigny =

Flavigny may refer to:

== Places ==
=== France ===
- Flavigny, Cher, in the Cher département
- Flavigny, Marne, in the Marne département
- Flavigny-le-Grand-et-Beaurain, in the Aisne département
- Flavigny-sur-Moselle, in the Meurthe-et-Moselle département
- Flavigny-sur-Ozerain, in the Côte-d'Or département
  - Flavigny Abbey, a Dominican (formerly Benedictine) monastery in Flavigny-sur-Ozerain

== Food ==
- Anise of Flavigny, an anise flavored pastille from France

== People with the surname ==
- Hugh of Flavigny (c. 1064-1140), Benedictine abbot and historian
