= Henry the Gallant =

French royal

Henry of Burgundy Henry the Gallant
- Born: c. 1035
- Died: 27 January 1070/1074
- Spouse: Sibylla or Clémence
- Issue detail: Hugh I, Duke of Burgundy; Odo I, Duke of Burgundy; Robert, Bishop of Langres; Raynald, abbot of Flavigny; Henry, Count of Portugal; Helie; Beatrice
- Father: Robert I, Duke of Burgundy
- Mother: Helie of Semur

Henry of Burgundy (c. 1035 – 27 January 1070/1074), called the Gallant (le Damoiseau), was the eldest surviving son and heir of Robert I, Duke of Burgundy, second son of Robert II of France, and Helie of Semur, daughter of Dalmas I of Semur. Little is known about his life. He died shortly before his father and was never duke himself.

The name of Henry's wife is not known: both Sibylla and Clémence have been suggested. The first of these derives from an undated obituary from Besançon, Sainte-Etienne, naming "Sibilla, mater ducus Burgundie" (Sibylla, mother of the duke of Burgundy), it being reasoned that since she is the mother of a duke but not herself called 'duchess', she must have been married to the sole father of a duke who was not a duke himself, Henry. However, historian Jean Richard has pointed out that this likely simply related the deceased to the duke at the time it was recorded, and that this referred to Sibylla of Burgundy, Duchess of Burgundy, mother of then-ruling Hugh II, Duke of Burgundy. The observation of repeated use of the name Clémence among the descendants of Henry's son Odo I, Duke of Burgundy, led Richard suggested that as the possible name of Odo's mother, though Odo's wife had a sister, Clementia of Burgundy, who could just as well have been the inspiration for its use among their descendants. Her origin is likewise undocumented and subject to speculation. Based on the use of the byname Borel by Odo, genealogist Szabolcs de Vajay proposed that his mother was the daughter of Berenguer Ramon I, Count of Barcelona, and his third wife, Guisle of Lluca, and hence the granddaughter of Ramon Borrell, Count of Barcelona, although there is no documentary evidence that this was the case. Henry's wife died on or after July 6, 1074.

== Family ==
Henry and his wife had the following children:

- Hugh I, Duke of Burgundy (1057–1093)
- Odo I, Duke of Burgundy (1058–1103)
- Robert, bishop of Langres (1059–1111)
- Helie, a nun (b. 1061)
- Beatrice (b. 1063), married Guy III, Lord of Vignory
- Reginald/Raynald, abbot of Saint-Pierre de Flavigny (1065–1090)
- Henry (1066–1112), count of Portugal from 1093 and father of King Afonso I of Portugal
