= Robert of Burgundy =

Robert of Burgundy may refer to:

- Robert II of France, duke of Burgundy (1004–16)
- Robert I, Duke of Burgundy (r. 1032–76)
- Robert of Burgundy (died 1113), regent of Sicily
- Robert of Burgundy (bishop of Langres) (1087–1111)
- Robert of Autun, bishop (1122–40)
- Robert II, Duke of Burgundy (r. 1272–1306)
- Robert of Burgundy (died 1317)
- Robert, Count of Tonnerre (1302–1334)

== See also ==
- Dukes of Burgundy family tree
