= Henry of Burgundy =

Henry of Burgundy may refer to:

- Henry I of Burgundy (946–1002), duke, sometimes called Odo Henry
- Henry I of France (1008–1060), king, also held Burgundy
- Henry, son of Robert I of Burgundy (1035–1074), father of two dukes of Burgundy, and of:
  - Henry of Portugal (1066–1112), count
