= Raynald I, abbot of Flavigny =

Raynald
- Abbot of Flavigny
- Born: 1059
- Died: 10 February 1090 (aged 30–31)
- Noble family: House of Burgundy
- Father: Henry, son of Robert I of Burgundy
- Mother: Sibylla or Clémence

Raynald of Burgundy (1059–1090) was a son of Henry of Burgundy and grandson of Robert I, Duke of Burgundy. He was abbot of Flavigny from 1084 to his death in 1090. Philip I of France said in 1085 that Raynald "was joined to him in the flesh". After his premature death, the Abbey of Flavigny was without an abbot for 7 years, except for a brief period of 2 months under Elmuin.
