= Collegiate Church of Notre-Dame, Semur-en-Auxois =

Church in Côte-d'Or, France

Coordinates: 47.490635°N 4.333073°E

Collégiale de Semur-en-Auxois
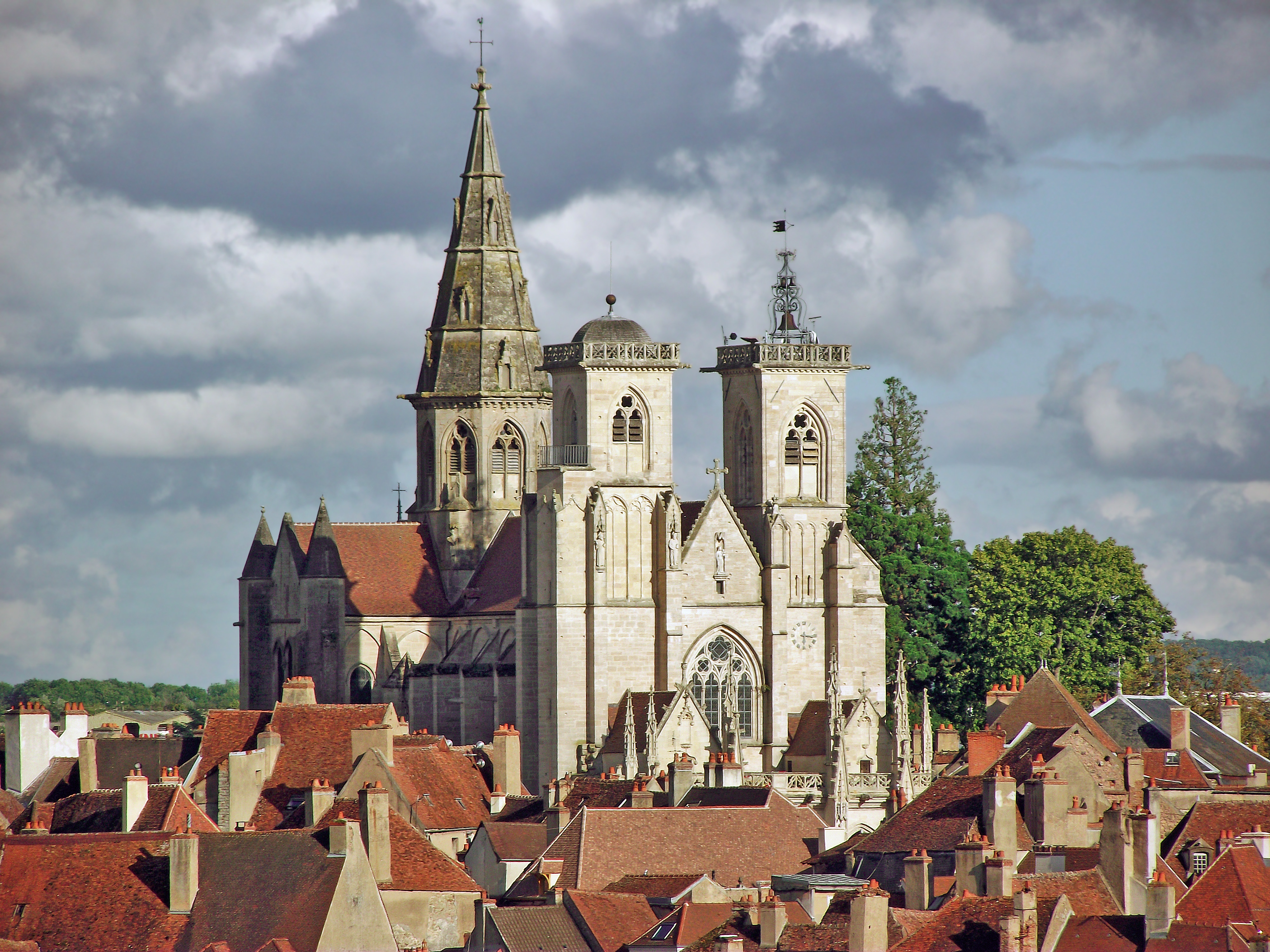
- The church over the rooftops of Semur
- Collégiale de Semur-en-Auxois
- Location: Semur-en-Auxois
- Country: France
- Denomination: Catholic

History
- Status: Parish church
- Dedication: Mary, mother of Jesus

Architecture
- Functional status: Active
- Style: Gothic
- Years built: 13th–16th centuries

Administration
- Province: Dijon
- Diocese: Dijon

Monument historique
- Designated: 1840
- Reference no.: PA00112669

The Collegiate Church of Notre-Dame (French: Collégiale Notre-Dame) is a medieval church in Semur-en-Auxois in the department of Côte-d'Or, France. Founded during the 11th century and rebuilt in the 13th century, with further additions made over the following centuries, the church is a notable example of the Gothic architecture of Burgundy and remains a reminder of the town's significance during the Middle Ages.

== History ==
Tradition states that Robert I of Burgundy, in atonement for the murder of his father-in-law Dalmace I of Semur-en-Brionnais, decided to build a church in the east part of Semur-en-Auxois.

The original foundation, which operated as a Benedictine priory dependent on Flavigny Abbey, was eventually replaced by the present-day church, whose construction began around 1225. The new church was dedicated to the Assumption of the Virgin Mary, with its choir oriented in the direction of the sunrise on 15 August each year (the day of the Assumption).

In the 15th century several large donations, mostly from the town's craft guilds, allowed for the addition of lateral chapels to the north aisle of the church.

Notre-Dame became a collegiate church in 1739 and was later restored by the architect Eugène Viollet-le-Duc starting from 1845. Viollet-le-Duc quoted 56,791 francs for the project. In the first progress report, dated 1847, he noted that the spire over the transept crossing had been reinforced and its summit rebuilt, and that the timber-framed roof above the choir had been reconstructed. The restoration works continued until 1854-55.

The church has been a classified monument historique since 1840 and continues to operate as the parish church of Semur-en-Auxois today.

== Architecture ==
=== Exterior ===
The west front, facing the Place Notre-Dame, is flanked by two square towers, while an octogonal bell tower with a stone spire rises to a height of 58 metres above the transept crossing. The entrance is through a vast arcaded porch sheltering the three 15th-century west portals. The trumeau of the central portal features a 16th-century sculpture of the Madonna and Child.

On the north side of the church is the Porte des Bleds ('Gate of the Wheat'), named after the cultivated farmland onto which it once opened. The portal's 13th-century tympanum depicts the Incredulity of Thomas (Doubting Thomas) and the evangelisation of India. The medieval hinges of the doors were restored in 1846 by the ironworker Pierre Boulanger.

The east end terminates in a classic French Gothic chevet, with radiating chapels extending from the polygonal apse of the choir.

On the south side of the church is a small cloister with only two bays per range.

West facade

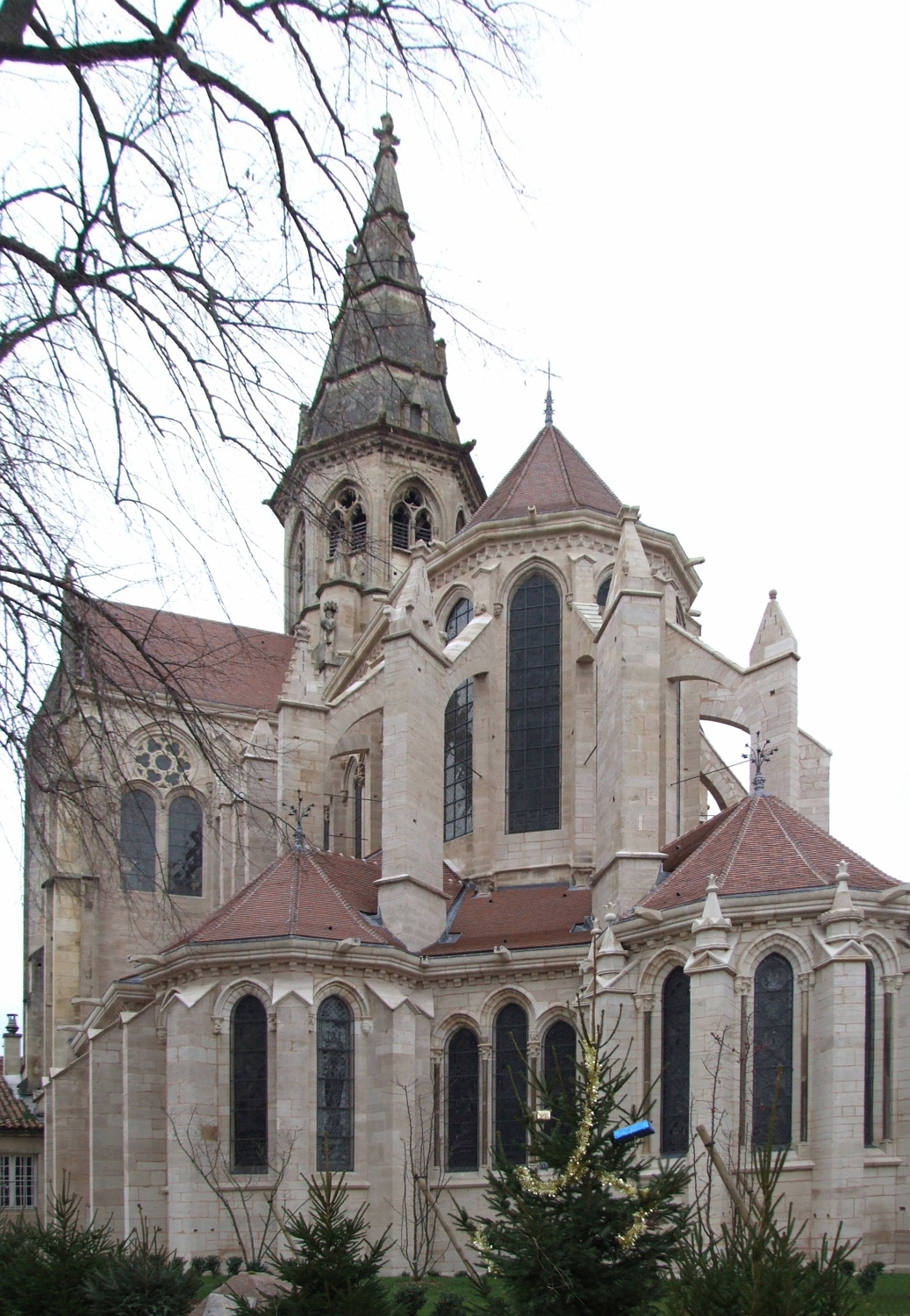
East end

Great west portal

Porte des Bleds

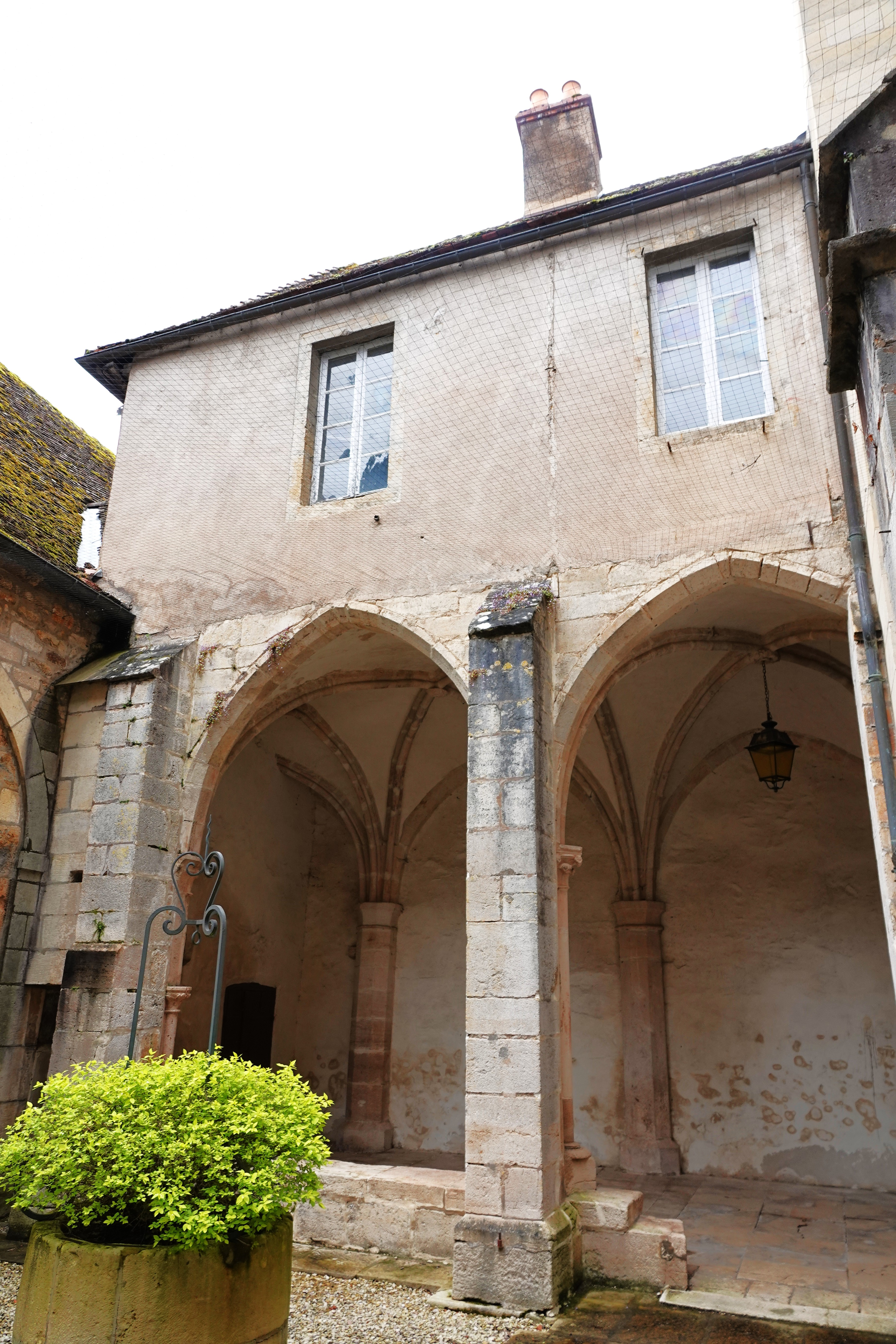
Cloister

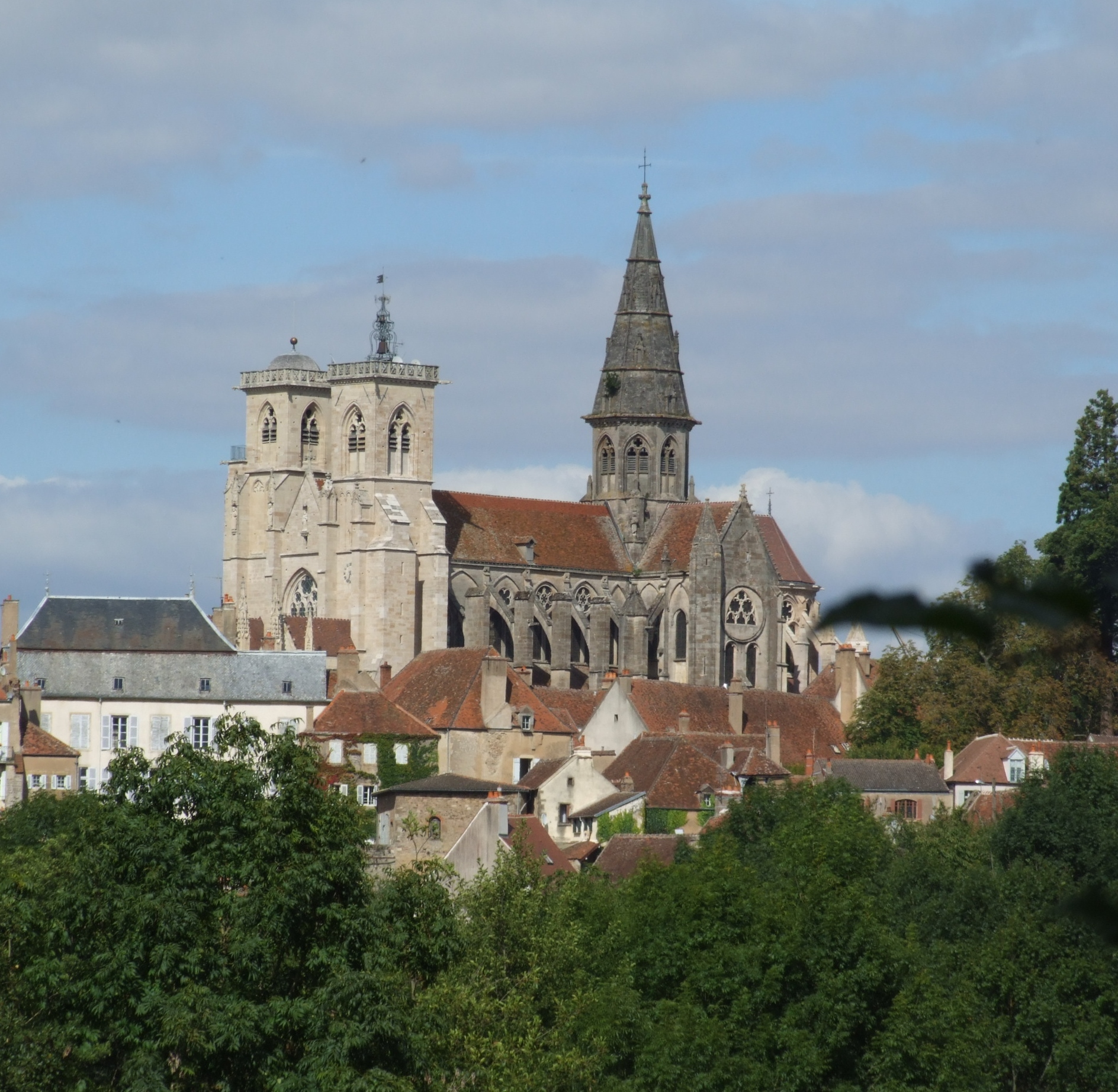
View from the south

=== Interior ===
The nave, dating from the 13th and 14th centuries, is notable for its great height and narrowness. It is eight bays long and vaulted by quadripartite rib vaults, reaching 20.6 metres high. Many of the capitals from which the vaults spring retain traces of their medieval polychromy.

The three-bay choir (built between 1220 and 1240) and the transepts are lined with a narrow triforium above the aisle arcades, embellished with a number of sculpted heads representing the range of people who constituted 13th-century society in Semur-en-Auxois. The large capitals in the aisles of the choir are also very finely sculpted, many featuring vegetal motifs or crocketed designs. The choir stalls date from 1728, and the stained glass of the central window in the apse clerestory was made by Félix Gaudin in 1891, depicting the Assumption of the Virgin Mary surrounded by four angels in the sky.

The eastern end of the choir is encircled by an ambulatory giving access to three radiating chapels. The central axial chapel is dedicated to the Virgin Mary, flanked on either side by chapels to Saint Eloi and Saint Joseph.

Several lateral chapels from the 15th and 16th centuries are positioned along the north aisle, mostly funded by donations from the medieval craft guilds. The drapers' chapel has stained-glass windows that illustrate the activities related to the craft, such as shearing, washing, fulling, cutting, carding, weaving and combing. The windows of the butchers' chapel depict the slaughter of an ox and the preparation of meat. There is also a chapel dedicated to Saint Barbara, as well as a chapel of the Holy Sepulchre containing a polychrome statue of the Burial of Jesus by Antoine Le Moiturier and a window commemorating the American soldiers who died during the First World War.

Mounted on the west wall of the nave, the organ comprises 35 stops across three manuals and a pedalboard, featuring a 16-foot bourdon and a 4-foot positif. It was built in 1777 by Joseph Rabiny and modified in 1833 by the Callinet brothers.

Nave

Choir

North transept

Axial chapel of St. Mary
Vegetal capital with mythical creatures

Carved heads in the triforium

Drapers' chapel window (16th c.)

Saint Barbara's chapel window

Burial of Christ sculpture (15th c.)

Tree of Jesse altarpiece (1454)
