= Robert of Burgundy (bishop of Langres) =

Robert
- Bishop of Langres
- Seal of Hugh III of Burgundy
- Born: 1059
- Died: 18 September 1111 (aged 51–52); Châtillon-sur-Seine
- Noble family: House of Burgundy
- Father: Henry, son of Robert I of Burgundy
- Mother: Sibylla or Clémence

Robert of Burgundy (1059–1111) was a son of Henry of Burgundy and grandson of Robert I, Duke of Burgundy. He was an archdeacon at Langres and was named bishop of Langres in 1085. Together with his brother Odo I, Duke of Burgundy, he participated in the French expedition to the Iberian peninsula that ended, with little accomplished, in the failed siege of Tudela in 1087.

He took the habit at the abbey of Molesme in 1111, and died at Châtillon-sur-Seine on 18 September 1111.
