= Odo I of Burgundy =

Odo I
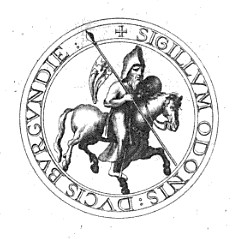
- Seal of Odo I

Duke of Burgundy
- Reign: 1079–1102
- Predecessor: Hugh I
- Successor: Hugh II
- Died: 1102 (aged 41–42); Tarsus
- Spouse: Sibylla of Burgundy
- Issue detail: Helie of Burgundy; Florine of Burgundy; Hugh II, Duke of Burgundy; Henry
- House: House of Burgundy
- Father: Henry, son of Robert I of Burgundy
- Mother: Sibylla or Clémence

Odo I (d. 1101/2 Tarsus), also known as Eudes, surnamed Borel and called the Red, was duke of Burgundy between 1079 and 1102. Odo was the second son of Henry of Burgundy and grandson of Robert I. He became the duke following the abdication of his older brother, Hugh I, who retired to become a Benedictine monk at Cluny.

He participated in the French expedition to the Iberian peninsula, started after the Battle of Sagrajas and ending with the inconclusive Siege of Tudela in 1087. Later, he participated in the Crusade of 1101, where he died, while in Asia Minor, in 1101/2. (Note: Bouchard states Odo died in 1102)

In a charter from his expedition to the Iberian peninsula, he admitted he had withheld property belonging to the abbey of Saint-Philibert de Tournus, an abbey patronized by his aunt Constance, wife of Alfonso VI of León and Castile. In 1101, when leaving on crusade, he made a gift and a will in favor of the abbey of Molesme. Also when leaving on crusade, he signed a charter of renunciation at St. Beningne de Dijon and another at the priory of Gevrey-Chambertin.

An incident is reported of Odo by an eyewitness, Eadmer, biographer of Anselm of Canterbury. While Saint Anselm was progressing through Odo's territory on his way to Rome in 1097, the bandit, expecting great treasure in the archbishop's retinue, prepared to ambush and loot it. Coming upon the prelate's train, the duke asked for the archbishop, whom they had not found. Anselm promptly came forward and took the duke by surprise, saying "My lord duke, suffer me to embrace thee." The flabbergasted duke immediately allowed the bishop to embrace him and offered himself as Anselm's humble servant.

== Family ==
Odo married Sibylla of Burgundy, daughter of William I, Count of Burgundy. They had:

- Helie of Burgundy 1080–1141, wife of Bertrand of Toulouse and William III of Ponthieu
- Florine of Burgundy 1083–1097, wife of Sweyn the Crusader, prince of Denmark
- Hugh II of Burgundy 1084–1143
- Henry 1087–1125, a priest

== Sources ==
- Barton, Simon (2015). "Spain in the Eleventh Century". In Luscombe, David; Riley-Smith, Jonathan (eds.). The New Cambridge Medieval History. Vol. 4, C.1024 – c.1198, Part II. Cambridge University Press.
- Bouchard, Constance Brittain (1987). Sword, Miter, and Cloister: Nobility and the Church in Burgundy, 980–1198. Cornell University Press.
- Riley-Smith, Jonathan (1997). The First Crusaders 1095-1131. Cambridge University Press.
- Gwatkin, H.M., Whitney, J.P. (ed) The Cambridge Medieval History: Volume II—The Rise of the Saracens and the Foundations of the Western Empire. Cambridge University Press, 1926.
- Rule, Martin (1883). The Life and Times of St. Anselm: Archbishop of Canterbury and Primate of the Britains, Volume 2. Kegan Paul, Trench, & CO.

Preceded by Hugh I	Duke of Burgundy; 1079–1103	Succeeded by Hugh II
