= Margaret of Beverley =

12th-century pilgrim and crusader

Margaret of Beverley, sometimes called Margaret of Jerusalem, was a Christian pilgrim and Crusader in the late 12th century in the Holy Land. Probably born in the middle 12th century, Margaret travelled to the Holy Land in the mid-1180s on a pilgrimage but was caught up in the events surrounding the Third Crusade. She fought in the Siege of Jerusalem by Saladin in 1187, spent several months as an enslaved captive, and then took part in another battle near Antioch in 1188. Margaret left the Holy Land in 1191 and, after some time spent travelling Europe, eventually became a nun at the Cistercian monastery of Montreuil-sous-Laon in France.

An incomplete account of Margaret's life and travels survive in a book entitled Hodoeporicon et percale Margarite Iherosolimitane written by her younger brother Thomas of Froidmont. Margaret's story is probably the most well-documented account of a woman's experience during a crusade.

== Early life and family ==
Margaret was the daughter of two English commoners, Sibil (or Sibilla) and Hulno. Though conceived in England, Margaret was born in Jerusalem due to her parents being on a pilgrimage. It is unknown when exactly the pilgrimage of her parents took place, but it was perhaps in the 1130s or at some other point in the middle of the 12th century (perhaps c. 1150). According to later accounts, baby Margaret and her parents were pursued by a wolf during the pilgrimage, though Hulno kept it away by shaking a branch at it every time it approached the group.

Sibil and Hulno returned to England shortly after Margaret's birth and settled in Beverley, Yorkshire. Margaret's younger brother Thomas was born eleven years after her. Both Sibil and Hulno died not long after Thomas's birth, leaving Margaret to take care of her brother, among other things bringing him to a school. When he got older, Thomas entered the household of Thomas Becket, Archbishop of Canterbury (1119/1120–1170). In addition to Thomas, Margaret also had an older brother.

== The Holy Land ==
=== Siege of Jerusalem ===
As an adult, Margaret returned to the Holy Land in the mid-1180s, perhaps coinciding with Thomas becoming a monk at a French monastery in Froidmont, Picardy. According to the later writings of Thomas, Margaret had taken the cross (i.e. took a crusading vow): "she took the cross, to follow Christ as a Christian". The motivations for Margaret to return to the Holy Land are not known. Since no crusade was being organized at the time, it is likely that she left England on her own, with a group of pilgrims, or with a smaller group of crusaders who sought to serve in the defense of the Kingdom of Jerusalem. It is also unclear if she expected to partake in military action.

Margaret was present in Jerusalem when the city was besieged by Saladin in September 1187. Despite being a commoner, Margaret took an active role in the city's defense, fighting alongside the soldiers. It is unclear whether she was in the city specifically for this purpose or if she had been fulfilling her pilgrim's obligations at the time of the attack. According to Thomas, she said that "like fierce virago I tried to play the role of a man" and "a woman pretending to be a man ... terrified, but I pretended to not be afraid". Thomas also wrote that she improvised a helmet from a metal cooking pot, though some scholars, such as Susan Signe Morrison, accept the cooking pot story as true it is possible that it is an invented detail. Although the dire circumstances in Jerusalem at the time does not make it impossible that she fashioned a helmet from a cooking pot, it also reflects satirical and stereotypical medieval imagery of women warriors being strange.

Thomas continued by writing that Margaret had brought water to the defenders on the city walls, during which she was hit by a stone fragment launched from one of the siege engines outside the city, which eventually left a scar. These details may also perhaps be later inventions, as they reflect common medieval tropes of women's roles in war as auxiliaries, aiding the men. Warrior women were often portrayed in this way due to culturally being seen as good and virtuous and not being expected to fight; Christian authors typically did not record women fighting in the crusades, as this would discredit the male crusaders.

When the city fell to Saladin, he agreed on a ransom price for its inhabitants. Margaret was able to pay her ransom on her own accord and set off for the city of "Lachish" (perhaps Laodicea) where she and the party of refugees she accompanied believed they would be safe.

=== Later journey ===
Shortly after beginning the journey, Margaret and her party were captured by a group of Muslims and enslaved. (Note: According to Thomas, she was enslaved for fifteen months, though this does not accord with the other dates involved. In his writings, Thomas sought to stress the piety of his elder sister by writing in detail of the suffering and sacrifice she endured.) She worked for long periods every day: handling tasks such as chopping wood and gathering stones, and was frequently beaten and threatened. According to Thomas, her morale was unharmed, partly due to the presence of a well-educated priest among the captives who encouraged them in their faith and assured that there would come an end to their suffering.

Eventually she was freed by a Christian burgher from Tyre who paid the ransom of Margaret and the others. She then set out through the desert again, this time alone. Margaret made her way to Antioch due to having taken a vow of pilgrimage to visit the tomb of Saint Margaret of Antioch in the city. The journey to Antioch was somewhat delayed on account of Margaret having no money and she spent some time earning money through working as a washerwoman in another settlement on the way. While Margaret was in Antioch in July of 1188, the city came under attack by Saladin's forces, though this time the crusaders were victorious. Margaret was apparently involved in the battle, and participated in the plundering of the dead afterwards.

Margaret sometime thereafter began a journey south, intending to travel to Tripoli, when she was captured by Muslims again. She avoided being enslaved again, though how she did so differs between accounts; either the Muslims recognised the trinkets Margaret had taken from the dead after the battle near Antioch and let her go or she in her distress called on Saint Mary, which prompted them to release her. After being released, Margaret travelled to Acre, reaching the city in 1191, after the forces of Richard the Lionheart and Philip II of France had arrived there to partake in the Third Crusade (1189–1192). From Acre, Margaret embarked on a ship and travelled back to Europe.

== Return to Europe ==
Margaret did not initially return to England, instead travelling around the continent and visiting popular pilgrimage sites and shrines. Among the various locations she visited were Rome and Santiago de Compostela in Spain.

Margaret eventually sought out her brother Thomas in Froidmont. Since they had not seen each other for several years, Margaret at first had to convince Thomas that she was really his sister, and did so by mentioning the names of their parents. After a tearful reunion, Thomas began writing down her story and also persuaded Margaret to leave her secular life behind her and become a nun. Margaret lived as a nun for eighteen years at the Cistercian monastery of Montreuil-sous-Laon in France. It is not known exactly when she died, but it was probably around 1210 or 1214/1215.

== See also ==
- Women in the Crusades
