= Hugh I of Burgundy =

Hugh I
- prior of the Benedictine Abbey of Cluny

Duke of Burgundy
- Reign: 1076 – 1079
- Predecessor: Robert I
- Successor: Odo I
- Born: 1057
- Died: 29 August 1093
- House: House of Burgundy
- Father: Henry of Burgundy
- Mother: Sibylla or Clémence

Hugh I (1057 – August 29, 1093) was duke of Burgundy between 1076 and 1079. Hugh was son of Henry of Burgundy and grandson of Duke Robert I. He inherited Burgundy from his grandfather, following the premature death of Henry, but abdicated shortly afterwards in favor of his brother Odo I, in order to become a monk at Cluny. He briefly fought the Moors in the Iberian Peninsula with Sancho of Aragón.

His entry to Cluny in 1079, after sustaining injuries in battle, and at the same time as Guy, count of Macon and Guigues II, count of Albon, drew criticism from Pope Gregory VII. Gregory thought he had not made sure the duchy was at peace, and was thus endangering the lives of many Christians. He took vows as a monk and later became prior of the Benedictine Abbey of Cluny.

== See also ==
- Dukes of Burgundy family tree

== Sources ==
- Bouchard, Constance Brittain (1987). Sword, Miter, and Cloister: Nobility and the Church in Burgundy, 980–1198. Cornell University Press.
- Cowdrey, H.E.J. (2002). Pope Gregory VII 1073-1085. Clarendon Press.
- Hallam, Elizabeth (1980). Capetian France:987-1328. Longman Group Ltd.

Preceded by Robert I	Duke of Burgundy; 1076–1079	Succeeded by Odo I
