= Jardin botanique textile =

Botanical garden in France

Coordinates: 47°30′46″N 4°31′55″E

The Jardin botanique textile (1500 m²) is a botanical garden specializing in plants used for textiles, baskets, and rope. It is located on Rue Lacordaire, Flavigny-sur-Ozerain, Côte-d'Or, Burgundy, France, and open daily in the warmer months; an admission fee is charged.

Initially a vegetable garden, and since 1990 a sculpture garden, today's botanical garden was created in 2002 by textile designer Daniel Algranate as an adjunct to his museum, the Maison des Matières et du Design textile. It contains approximately 200 species of plants used for making textiles, baskets, rope, or dyes, with collections including abaca, agave, bamboo, broom, cotton, dogwood, flax, hemp, pineapple, and willow, as well as Alcea rosea, Artemisia vulgaris, Galium aparine, Cruciata laevipes, Galium odoratum, Genista tinctoria, Isatis tinctoria, Rubia peregrina, and Verbascum thapsus.

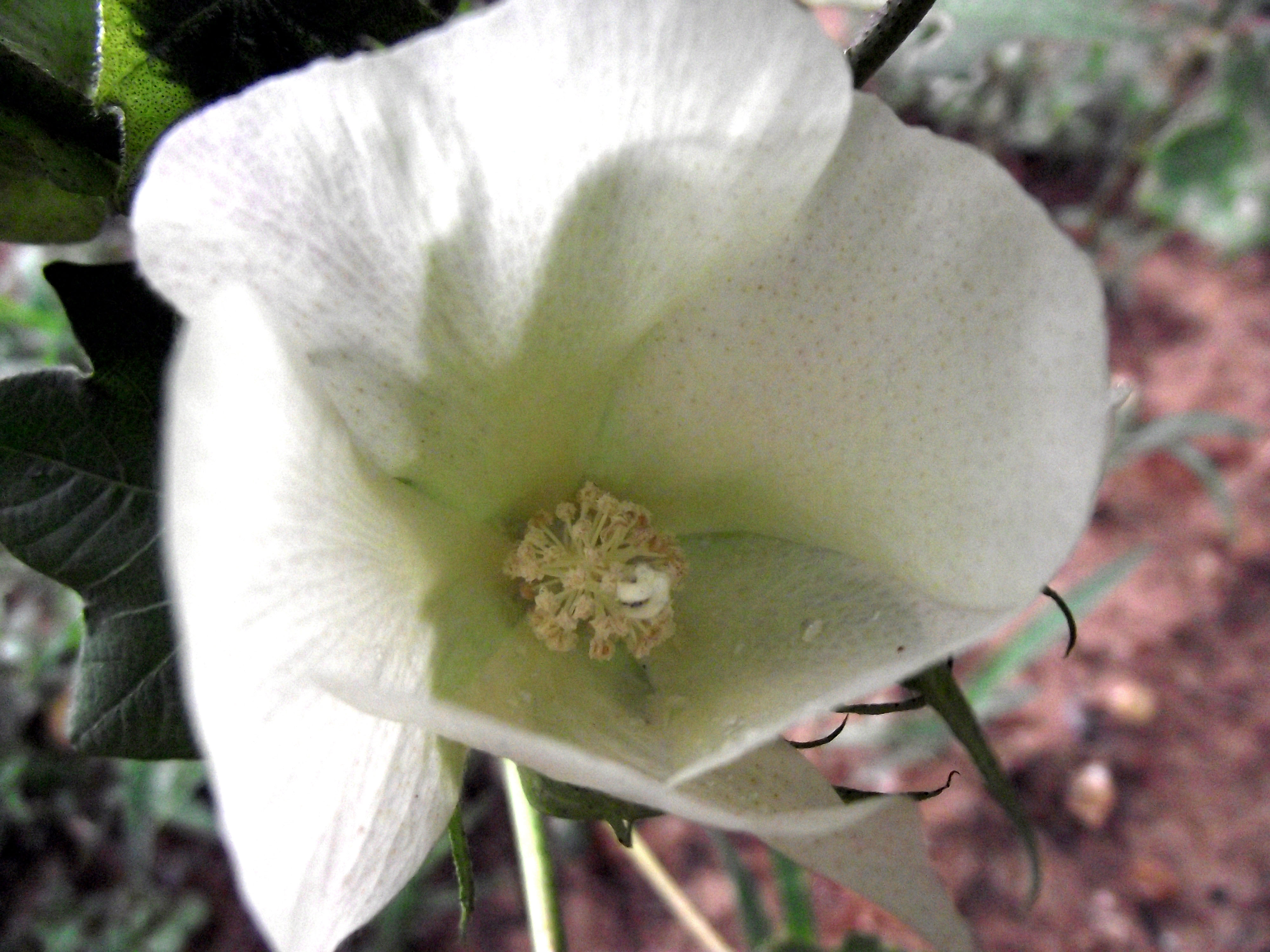
Jardin botanique textile

== See also ==
- List of botanical gardens in France
