= Army of William IX on the Crusade of 1101 =

The army of William IX on the Crusade of 1101 was formed by William IX “the Troubador,” Duke of Aquitaine, to fight in the minor Crusade of 1101. His army was destroyed by the Turks at Heraclea. Defeated, he reached Antioch with only six companions still alive.

The known members of the army included the ones listed below, as reported in histories of the first crusades. Unless otherwise noted, references are to the on-line database of Riley-Smith, et al, and the hyperlinks therein provide details including original sources. The names below are also referenced in the Riley-Smith tome, Appendix I: Preliminary List of Crusaders. Those references are not shown unless they appear elsewhere in the text of the book. Articles that are hyperlinked to a more detailed article in this encyclopædia rely on the latter for references. The members of William's army include:

- Arduin of Saint-Médard (St. Mars)
- Berlai of Passavant-sur-Layon
- Geoffrey III, Viscount of Thouars
- Herbert II of Thouars, brother of Geoffrey III, went on the crusade out of concern for his father's soul. Upon hearing of his brother's death (which was untrue), he had a stroke or heart attack at Jaffa in 1102. He was associated with the abbey of St. Florent-les-Saumur.
- Fantin Incorrigiatus and his son Godfrey, followers of Herbert II of Thouars
- Geoffrey, a doctor
- Geoffrey Burel of Amboise
- Corba of Thorigne, Lady of Amboise, wife of Geoffrey Burel, carried off by the Turks
- Geoffrey Jordan I (II), Count of Vendôme, killed in Arab hands after the Battle of Ascalon
- Ulric Bucel, travelled in the company of Geoffrey, Count of Vendôme
- Gerald of Tuda, Lord of Montmoreau, and his brother Itier. Gerald had left a bordery to the abbey of Saint-Jean-d'Angély in his will, but his brother gave it outright to the abbey after Gerald left on the crusade.
- Hugh VI “the Devil”, Lord of Lusignan, half-brother of Raymond IV, Count of Toulouse, a leader of the First Crusade (see the Army of Raymond of Saint-Gilles) and Berenguer Ramon II, Count of Barcelona (a crusader, but affiliation unknown).
- Leodegar, canon of Chartres
- Peter of La Garnache
- Rainald of Thiviers, Bishop of Périgueux, under the regency of Peter, Bishop of Limoges, and was described as "carrying Christ's cross to Jerusalem". Rainald died at Antioch.
- Ralph of Saintonge, a relative of William IX
- William of Apremont
- William Battle of Clermont-Ferrand, Bishop of Clermont
- William of the Camera. William was made a prévôt by William IX. He attacked the monks of Nouaille in order to take some of their mills. He later died in trial by combat.

== Sources ==
- Runciman, Steven, A History of the Crusades, Volume One: The First Crusade and the Foundation of the Kingdom of Jerusalem, Cambridge University Press, London, 1951
- Riley-Smith, Jonathan, The First Crusaders, 1095-1131, Cambridge University Press, London, 1997
- Riley-Smith, Jonathan, The First Crusade and the Idea of Crusading, University of Pennsylvania Press, 1986 (available on Google Books)
- Prof. J. S. C. Riley-Smith, Prof, Jonathan Phillips, Dr. Alan V. Murray, Dr. Guy Perry, Dr. Nicholas Morton, A Database of Crusaders to the Holy Land, 1099-1149 (available on-line).
