= Château de Gevrey-Chambertin =

Coordinates: 47°13′46″N 4°57′56″E

The Château de Gevrey-Chambertin is a castle located in Burgundy, 12 km from Dijon and 30 km from Beaune. Both, the castle and 5 acres (2.0 ha) of associated vineyard land, were purchased in 2012 by a businessman named Louis Ng of Macao, for the price of $10 million ($13.7 million in 2024 dollars).

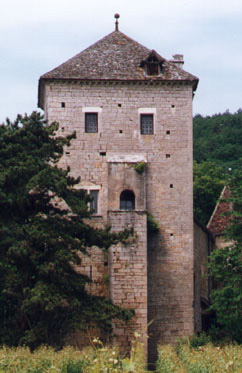
Château de Gevrey-Chambertin : the big square tower

== History ==
The castle of Gevrey-Chambertin, was certainly considerably revised in the second half of the 13th century, and was, during St Bernard lifetime, and even probably slightly earlier, a priory belonging to the Abbey of Cluny. Hughes, bishop of Auxerre, and his sister Maheldis – both descendants of Manasses of Vergy, a powerful leader of Burgundy in the 9th century, in 1015 and 1019 donated the "CURTIS" called Gevrey to the monastery of Cluny of which abbot was then St Odilon.

Then, Yves de Poisey and his nephew Yves de Chazan; both abbots of Cluny and born of the lords of Vergy, gave its first official appearance to the building, between 1257 and 1275 – a vast rectangle, surrounded with moats. The southwest entrance was composed of a stone bridge, and further a drawbridge, flanked by two square towers. A big square tower stood at the southeast corner, and at the northeast was a dovecote on top of a small "cul de lampe" tower. In the northwest, a gallery could be seen on top of a round tower. The wall with its covered way allowed to walk from a tower to the other. Plundering, wars, fires and time have all contributed to the destruction of the fortress. The only remaining parts of the original buildings are the drawbridge (considering that one of the towers and the drawbridge system are lacking), the big square tower, and the living quarters next to the drawbridge. Several remnants of the wall allow one to have an idea of what the castle used to look like.

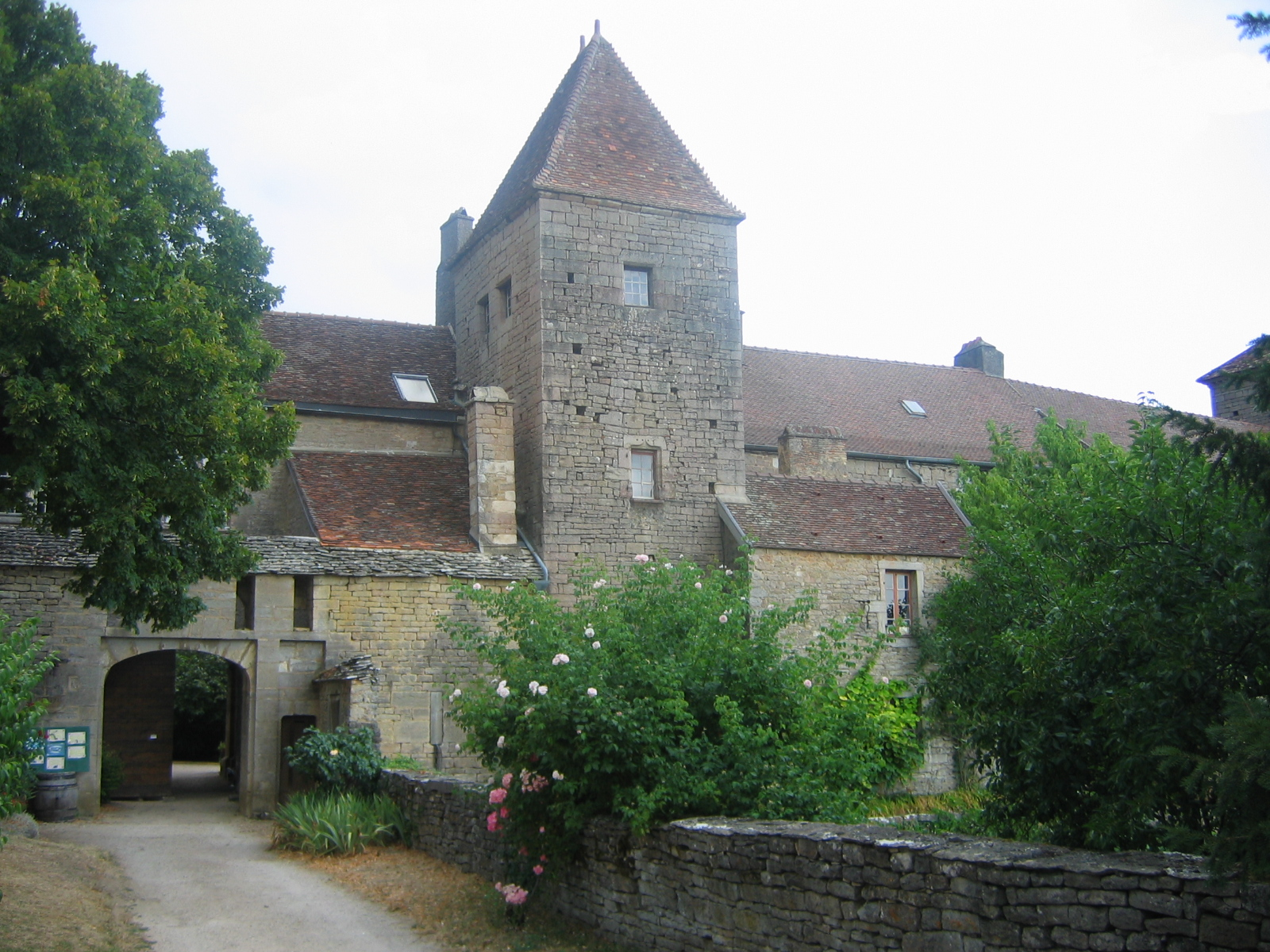
Château de Gevrey-Chambertin

Among the many works done since 1791, the date of sale of the castle as a national estate and until the end of the 19th century, the conversion of the middle floor of the square tower was probably the cause of the destruction of the exceptional tiled floor, dating from the time of St Bernard or maybe Yves de Poisey. This tiled floor, which probably already needed repairing, was not preserved as it should have been, considering its age and its artistic value. It was thrown away in what was called the "arsenal", and which is now a grass-covered terrace. Pieces of these glazed tiles, some intact and some broken, were found from place to place in the lime mortar of some walls, hardly buried in the immediate surroundings of the building, or found in the terrace while working on partly fallen walls. The castle has been the property of the Masson family since 1858, and is open for wine tasting and visits.

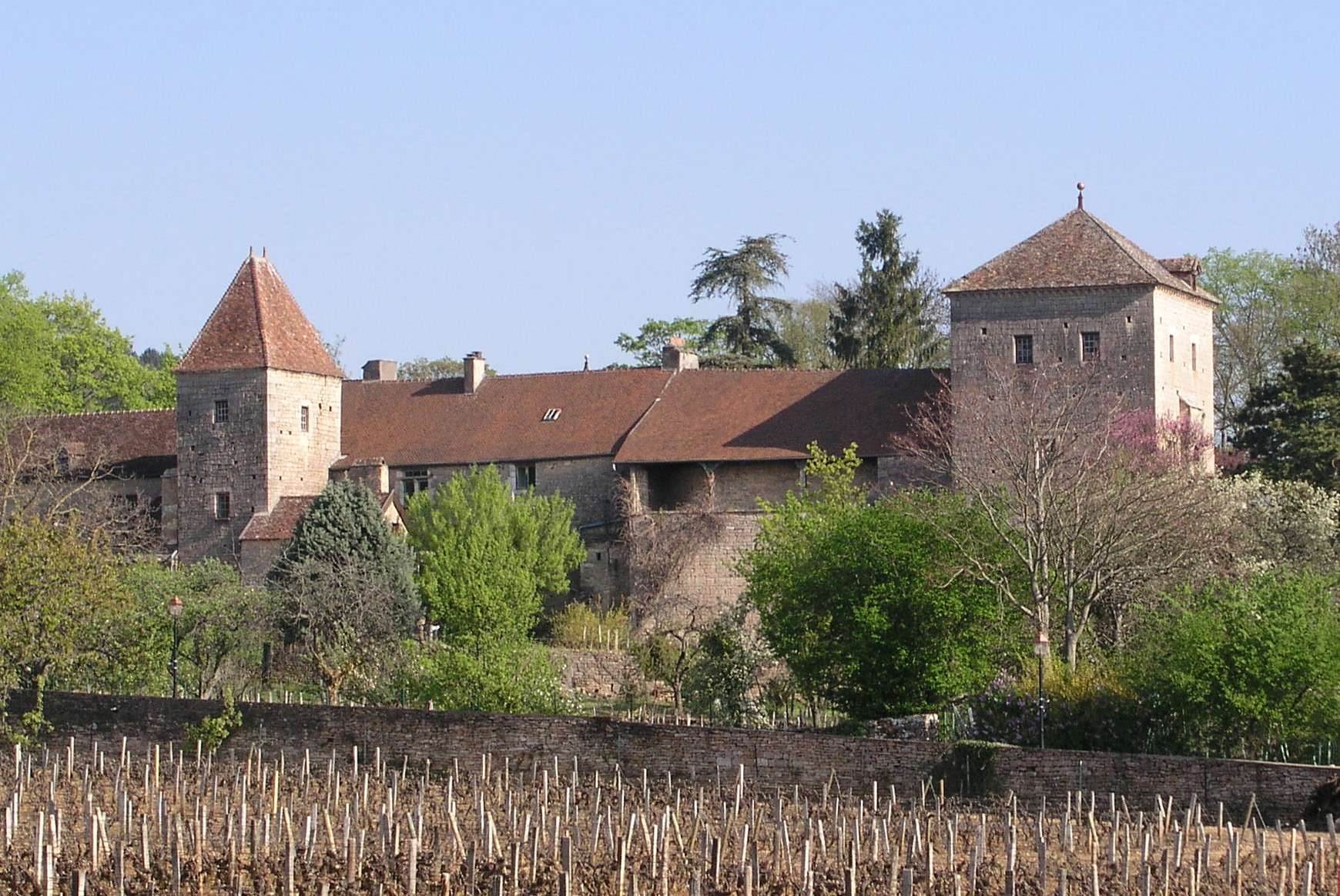

== See also ==
- Cluny Abbey
- Gevrey-Chambertin
