= Corba of Thorigne =

Corba of Thorigne, Lady of Amboise, daughter of Elisabeth of Amboise, sister of Suplice I Lord of Amboise, and Francis of Thorigné. Hugh I, Lord of Amboise and son of Suplice I, had married Elisabeth of Sauvigny, Lady of Jaligny and step-daughter of Fulk IV, Count of Anjou through his second wife Ermengarde de Bourbon. She inherited one of the three chateaux of Amboise.

Fulk arranged for Corba’s marriage to Aimery of Courran. Corba’s husband and her cousin Hugh participated in the First Crusade, but her husband was killed at the siege of Nicaea. Hugh returned wounded but alive.

Widowed, Fulk arranged the marriage of Corba to a very old man, Achard de Saintes. Not happy with the marriage, Corba successfully planned her abduction, and Achard, ailing, died soon afterwards. Fulk then had Corba marry a prominent knight named Geoffrey Burel, who became Lord of Amboise.

Geoffrey joined the army of William IX in the Crusade of 1101, and typical of William’s army, he brought his wife Corba with him. William’s prowess in battle was limited and the Turks quickly put an end to his endeavor. One hundred thousand Christians were captured and assumed killed or sent to slavery, including Geoffrey. Corba was abducted by the Turks and her fate remains unknown.

== Sources ==
- Duby, Georges, The Knight, the Lady and the Priest: The Making of Modern Marriage in Medieval France, University of Chicago Press, 1983, pgs 246-7 (available on Google Books)
- Riley-Smith, Jonathan, The First Crusaders, 1095-1131, Cambridge University Press, London, 1997, pgs. 88, 119, 156.
- Prof. J. S. C. Riley-Smith, Prof, Jonathan Phillips, Dr. Alan V. Murray, Dr. Guy Perry, Dr. Nicholas Morton, A Database of Crusaders to the Holy Land, 1099-1149 (available on-line)
- Riley-Smith, Jonathan, The First Crusade and Idea of Crusading, A&C Black, 2003 (available on Google Books)
