= Hugh II of Burgundy =

Hugh II
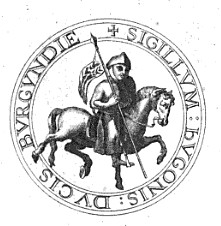
- Seal of Duke Hugh

Duke of Burgundy
- Reign: 1103 – 1143
- Predecessor: Odo I
- Successor: Odo II
- Born: 1084
- Died: 6 February 1143 (Aged 58-59)
- Spouse: Matilda of Mayenne
- Issue detail: Odo II, Duke of Burgundy; Sibylla of Burgundy; Aigeline of Burgundy; Clemence of Burgundy; Gauthier, Archbishop of Besançon; Hugh le Roux; Robert, Bishop of Autun; Henry, Bishop of Autun; Raymond, Count of Grignon; Matilda of Burgundy
- House: Burgundy
- Father: Odo I, Duke of Burgundy
- Mother: Sibylla of Burgundy

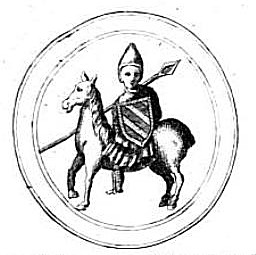
Seal of Hugh II of Burgundy

Hugh II (1084 – c. 6 February 1143) was Duke of Burgundy between 1103 and 1143. Hugh was son of Odo I, Duke of Burgundy. Hugh was selected custos for the monastery of St. Benigne, and this office would be held by his descendants until the end of the twelfth century.

In 1124, Hugh and his brother-in-law, William III, Count of Ponthieu, dispatched forces to Reims to support their overlord, King Louis VI of France, in his conflict with Emperor Henry V.

== Marriage and issue ==
In c.1115, Hugh married Matilda of Mayenne, daughter of Walter, Count of Mayenne and Adelina de Presles.

They had the following:

- Aigeline (b.1116), married Hugh I, Count of Vaudemont
- Clemence (b.1117), married Geoffrey III of Donzy
- Odo II, Duke of Burgundy, (1118–1162) married Maria of Champagne
- Gauthier, Archbishop of Besançon (1120–1180)
- Hugh le Roux (1121–1171) married Isabel of Chalon
- Robert, Bishop of Autun (1122–1140)
- Henry, Bishop of Autun (1124–1170)
- Raymond, Count of Grignon (1125–1156) married Agnes of Montpensier
- Sibylla (1126–1150), married Roger II of Sicily
- Ducissa (b.1128), married Raymond de Grancy
- Matilda (1130–1159), married William VII of Montpellier
- Aremburge (b.1132), Nun

== Sources ==
- Bouchard, Constance Brittain (1987). Sword, Miter, and Cloister: Nobility and the Church of Burgundy, 980-1198. Cornell University Press.
- Houben, Hubert (2002). Roger II of Sicily: A Ruler Between East and West. Cambridge University Press.
- Power, Daniel (2004). The Norman Frontier in the Twelfth and Early Thirteenth Centuries. Cambridge University Press.
- Thompson, Kathleen (1994). "William Talvas, Count of Ponthieu, and the Politics of the Anglo-Norman Realm". In Bates, David; Curry, Ann (eds.). England and Normandy in the Middle Ages. Hambledon Press.

== See also ==
- Dukes of Burgundy family tree

Preceded by Odo I	Duke of Burgundy; 1103–1143	Succeeded by Odo II
