= Flavigny-sur-Ozerain =

Commune in Bourgogne-Franche-Comté, France

- Commune
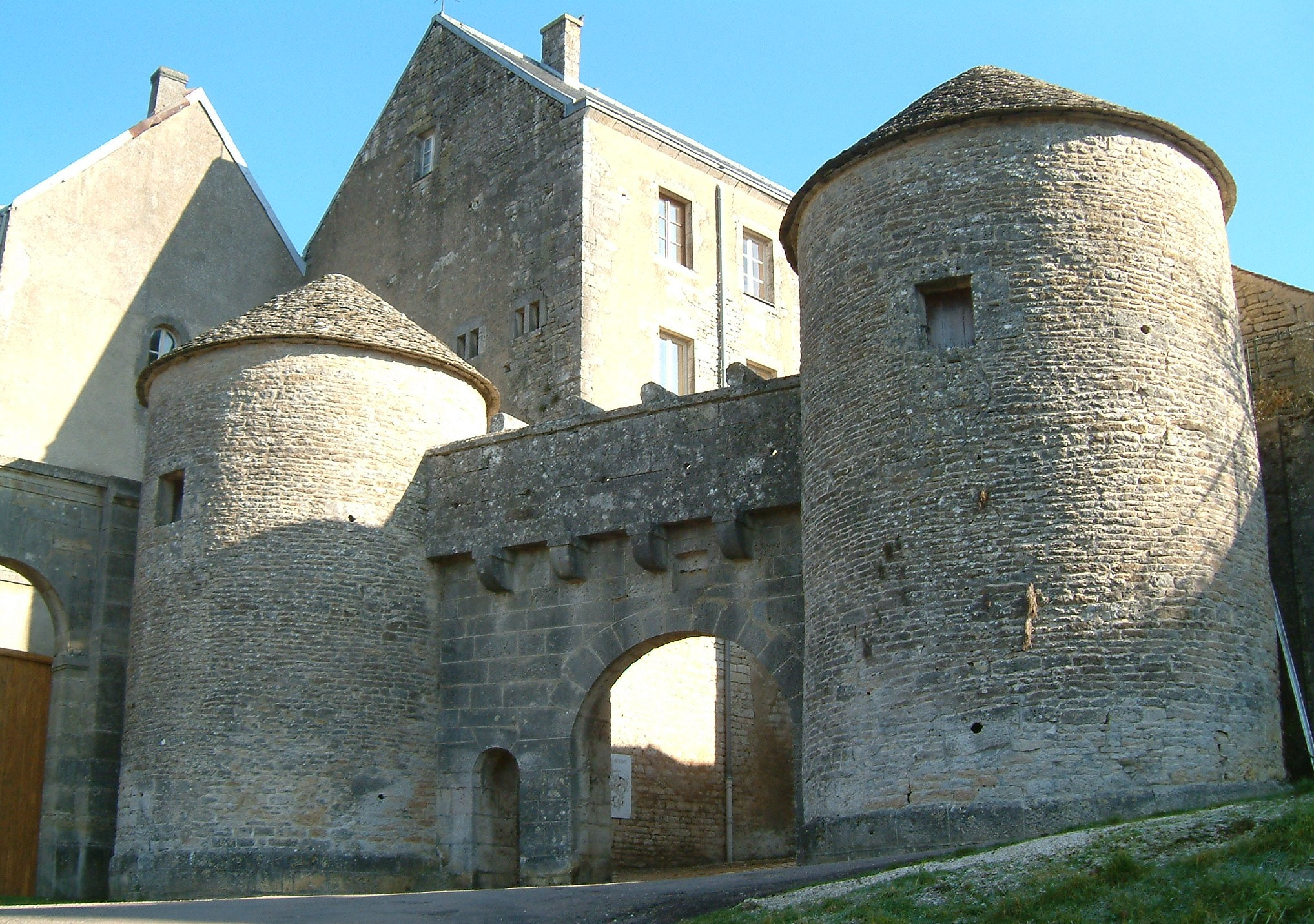
- The town gates in Flavigny-sur-Ozerain

- Coat of arms
- Location of Flavigny-sur-Ozerain
- Location within France Location within Bourgogne-Franche-Comté
- Coordinates: 47°30′46″N 4°31′55″E
- Country: France
- Region: Bourgogne-Franche-Comté
- Department: Côte-d'Or
- Arrondissement: Montbard
- Canton: Montbard

Government
  - Mayor (2020–2026): Dominique Bondivena
- Area^{1}: 27.79 km^{2} (10.73 sq mi)
- Elevation: 426 m (1,398 ft)
- Highest elevation: 482 m (1,581 ft)
- Lowest elevation: 239 m (784 ft)
- Population (2023): 274
  - Density: 9.86/km^{2} (25.5/sq mi)
- Time zone: UTC+01:00 (CET)
  - Summer (DST): UTC+02:00 (CEST)
- INSEE/Postal code: 21271 /21150
- ^{1} French Land Register data, which excludes lakes, ponds, glaciers > 1 km^{2} (0.386 sq mi or 247 acres) and river estuaries.

Flavigny-sur-Ozerain (French pronunciation: [flaviɲi syʁ ozʁɛ̃]) is a commune in the French department of Côte-d'Or, in Bourgogne-Franche-Comté.

The village was awarded membership in Les Plus Beaux Villages de France ("France's most beautiful villages").

== Geography ==
The medieval village of Flavigny is situated on a rocky spur, surrounded by three streams: the Ozerain, the Recluse and the Verpant.

== History ==
The first written mention of the village of Flavigny was in the Latin form of its name, Flaviniacum, which appears in the cartulary (or charter) of the Benedictine abbey founded on the site by a certain Widerard in 719. In the mid-9th century, in response to the increasing frequency of Viking raids, the relics of Saint Reine (or Santa Regina) were removed from the nearby town of Alise to Flavigny in the hopes that they could be better protected in a more fortified setting. The relics remain in Flavigny to this day, although they travel back to Alise every autumn for the celebration of the saint's feast day in early September.

The town was prosperous during the Middle Ages, catering to large numbers of pilgrims, both those who came to visit the relics of Saint Reine and those on their way to Santiago de Compostela. By the 10th century, the abbey had grown into a town, with a parish church dedicated to St. Genest in addition to the abbey church (dedicated to St. Peter). During the 12th and 13th centuries, extensive fortifications were raised around the town. Large sections of these walls still surround the village to this day, including the Porte du Val, which includes both an inner gate dating to the 13th century and a 16th-century outer gate, and the 15th-century Porte du Bourg, with a statue of the Virgin. Despite these fortifications, Flavigny was taken and occupied by the English during the Hundred Years' War.

In 1632 the Ursuline convent of Flavigny was founded, and in the early 18th century a new residence for the Abbot of Flavigny was constructed. However, by that time the abbacy had become corrupt and was held by a layman who had little to do with the town. At the time of the French Revolution, there may have been as few as five monks in residence. The abbey church was probably already in ruins, although local tradition holds that it suffered damage at the hands of revolutionaries. The parish church, St. Genest, emerged from the Revolution more or less unharmed.

In the 21st century, Flavigny has fewer than 400 year-round residents, although this number increases in the summer due to the substantial number of foreigners (British, Swiss, American, Australian, German) who have summer homes in the village. The abbey now houses the factory which manufactures Les Anis de Flavigny, small aniseed-flavored pastilles distributed worldwide. Various artists and artisans make their homes in the village, and it has become a popular tourist destination.

== Population ==
Historical population
Year	Pop.	±% p.a.
1968	437	—
1975	385	−1.79%
1982	435	+1.76%
1990	411	−0.71%
1999	341	−2.05%
2007	332	−0.33%
2012	305	−1.68%
2017	302	−0.20%
2023	274	−1.61%
Source: INSEE

== Sights ==
- Flavigny Abbey
- The Jardin botanique textile is a botanical garden specializing in plants used for textiles, baskets, and rope.

== Economy ==
Flavigny is the sole producer of the anise-flavored candy Anise de Flavigny, which was first produced by the monks.

== Film ==
Chocolat (2000) was shot in Flavigny-sur-Ozerain.

== Religion ==
Flavigny-sur-Ozerain is home to Saint Joseph de Clairval Abbey. The Benedictine monks there live according to the rule of St. Benedict and offer retreats for lay Catholics and workshops on desk top publishing and the manufacturing of icons. Flavigny also has a seminary of the Society of St. Pius X, a Traditionalist Catholic organisation, the Séminaire International Saint Curé d'Ars.

== See also ==
- Communes of the Côte-d'Or department
