= Geoffrey Burel of Amboise =

Geoffrey Burel of Amboise (d. 1101) was Lord of Amboise jure uxoris and a knight in the Crusade of 1101, fighting in the army of William IX. Note that this individual is not the same as the Geoffrey Burel who was a commander in the service of Peter the Hermit.

Geoffrey was arranged to be married to Corba of Thorigne, Lady of Amboise, the daughter of the son-in-law of Fulk IV le Réchin, Count of Anjou. Widowed twice, Corba's marriage was arranged by Fulk to maintain control of the estates of Amboise.

As was typical of the army of William, in which wives accompanied their husbands on crusade, Corba went with Geoffrey to the Holy Land. Geoffrey was killed at the battles of Heraclea and Corba was abducted by the Turks and never heard from again.

== Sources ==
- Riley-Smith, Jonathan, The First Crusaders, 1095-1131, Cambridge University Press, London, 1997
- Prof. J. S. C. Riley-Smith, Prof, Jonathan Phillips, Dr. Alan V. Murray, Dr. Guy Perry, Dr. Nicholas Morton, A Database of Crusaders to the Holy Land, 1099-1149 (available on-line)
- Duby, Georges, The Knight, the Lady and the Priest: The Making of Modern Marriage in Medieval France, University of Chicago Press, 1983, pgs 246-7 (available on Google Books)
- Riley-Smith, Jonathan, The First Crusade and Idea of Crusading, A&C Black, 2003 (available on Google Books)
