= Anise of Flavigny =

Candy from Burgundy, France

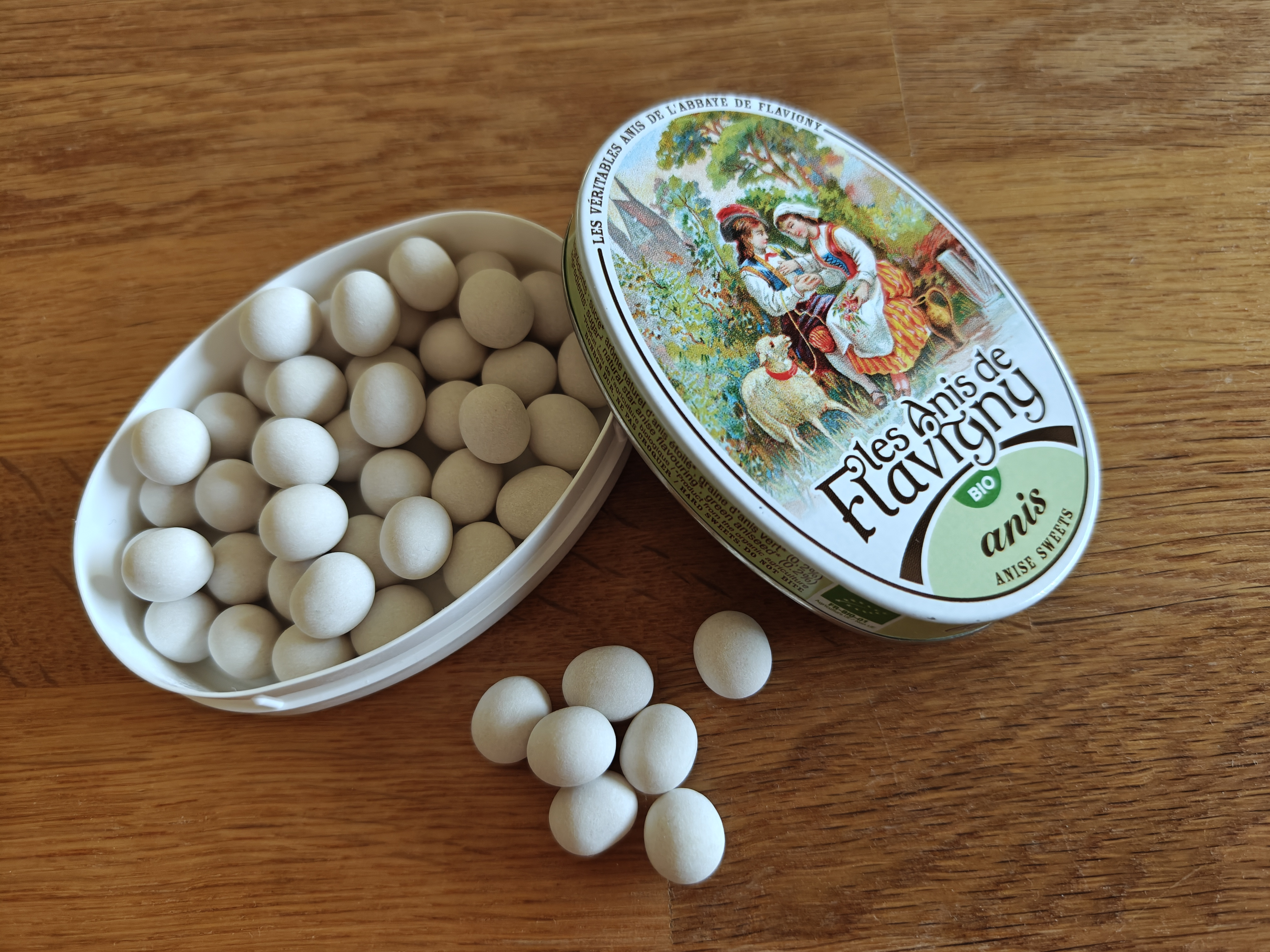
- Type: aniseed dragée
- Place of origin: France
- Region or state: Burgundy
- Created by: Order of Saint Benedict
- Main ingredients: anise, sugar syrup, natural flavorings

Anise of Flavigny is a candy from Flavigny-sur-Ozerain in Burgundy.

Anise candies were first made by the Benedictine monks at the Flavigny Abbey, founded in 719, as reported by the Roman traveller Flavius. After the French Revolution, several confectioners began making this delicacy using the same recipe. Only one manufacturer remains today at the abbey, Maison Troubat, who claims to follow a recipe which has been in use since 1591.

Each candy is made in a dragée process starting with a single anise seed. Over a 15-day period, the seed is coated with successive layers of inverted sugar syrup, derived from either sugar beet or ECOCERT-certified organic sugarcane. The candy is always labelled Anis de Flavigny by its makers. While the name suggests anise, other flavors such as violet, rose, mint, jasmine, cassis, liquorice, or cinnamon and orange are also available and are specified after the name.

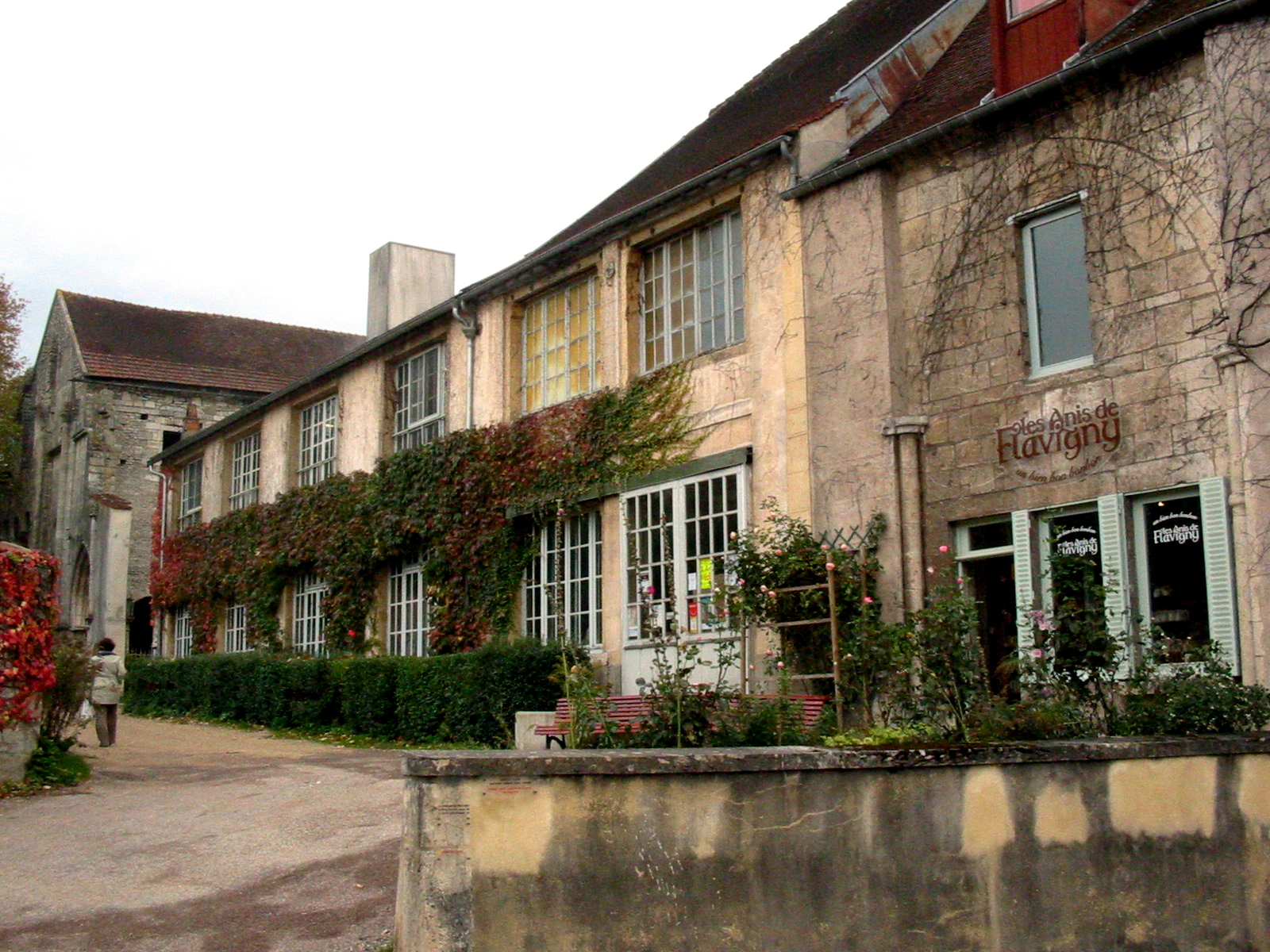
The candy maker Anis de Flavigny.

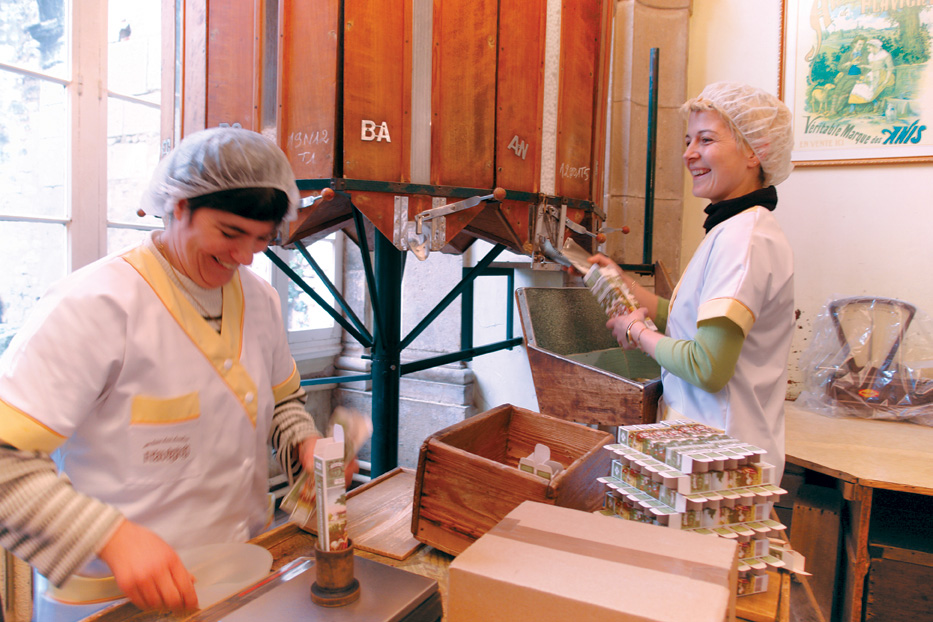
Inside the aniseed candy factory.
