= Florine of Burgundy =

Princess consort of Denmark

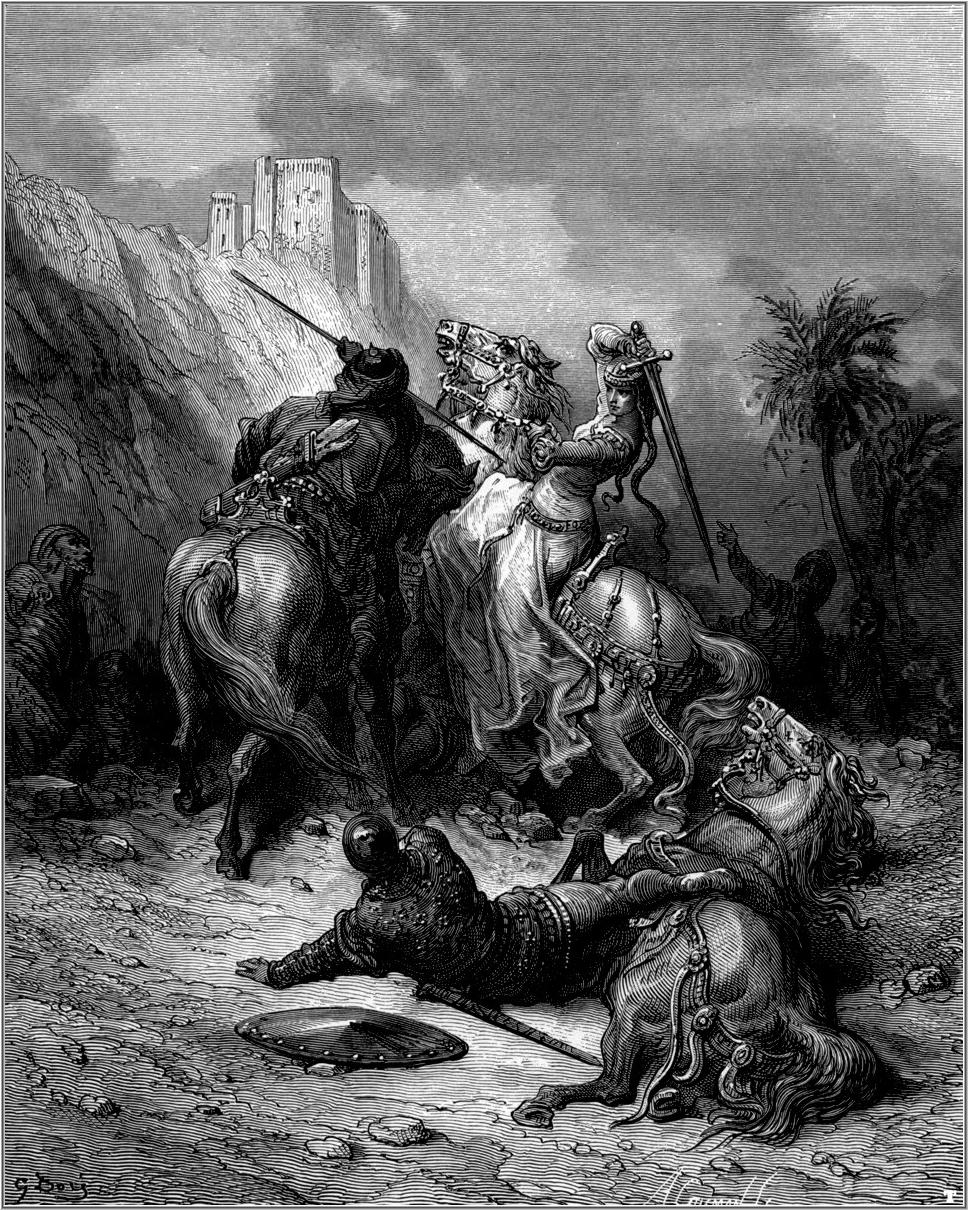
- Engraving of Florine of Burgundy in battle by Gustave Doré, 19th century
- Born: 1083
- Died: 1097 (aged 13–14); Philomelium (modern-day Akşehir, Turkey)
- Spouse: Sweyn the Crusader
- House: House of Burgundy
- Father: Odo I, Duke of Burgundy
- Mother: Sibylla of Burgundy

Florine of Burgundy (1083–1097 at Philomelium, modern-day Akşehir, Turkey) was a French crusader.

Florine was the daughter of Duke Odo I of Burgundy and Sybilla of Burgundy. Supposedly, she married Sweyn the Crusader.

== Legend ==
According to legend, Florine and her husband Sweyn led an army of 1500 Danish knights on to a crusade, as the couple had planned to get married in Jerusalem. However, they were ambushed by the Turks in Cappadocia, Anatolia, and were severely outnumbered. According to one tradition, the couple fought valiantly until Florine was pierced by either 6 or 7 arrows. Another rendition is that Florine was captured by the Turks, before getting beheaded in front of the Sultan.

== Authenticity ==
Historians are sceptical of Florine's existence, as only one chronicle mentions her name, which was written by Albert of Aix. William of Tyre, one of the chroniclers of the crusades, mentions her husband Sweyn, but not her.

== Fiction ==
Florine's life was dramatized by William Bernard McCabe in the novel Florine, Princess of Burgundy: A Tale of the First Crusaders, published in 1855.
