= Hugh of Flavigny =

Benedictine monk and historian

Hugh or Hugo (born c. 1064) was a Benedictine monk and historian. He served as abbot of Flavigny from 1097 to 1100.

== Life ==
Hugh was born about 1064, probably at Verdun. According to his own testimony, his mother was Lady Dada of Montfaucon, daughter of Chlotildis, daughter of the Emperor Otto III. In any case, he belonged to a prominent family, and received his education at the Abbey of St-Vannes near Verdun, where he afterwards took the habit of a Benedictine novice. As Theoderic (bishop of Verdun), was a supporter of the Holy Roman emperor Henry IV and antipope Clement III, in 1085, the Abbot of St-Vannes, who supported the pope, was forced to leave his monastery.

He went to the Abbey of St-Bénigne at Dijon, where he was followed by nearly all of his monks, including Hugh. While at Dijon, the latter made his vows before the Abbot Jarento, a strong adherent of the ecclesiastical party and an enthusiastic personal friend of Pope Gregory VII. Abbot Jarento soon gave Hugh his entire confidence; He accompanied Jarento on a diplomatic mission to Normandy and England in 1096 to negotiate peace between King William Rufus of England and his brother, Duke Robert of Normandy.

Hugh, the Archbishop of Lyon, was also most friendly towards the young monk and often requisitioned his services. In 1096, notwithstanding his youth, Hugh was elected Abbot of Flavigny, but soon became involved in disputes, not only with the Bishop of Autun, in whose diocese he was, but also with his own monks, who wished to make use of all, even dishonest, means in the pope's behalf. On account of these differences, he was obliged on two occasions to flee, and finally to abdicate, although the Sixth Council of Valence (in 1100) ordered him to be reinstated. These bitter experiences gradually brought about a complete change in his politico-religious views on the question of investitures. From a zealous, self-sacrificing champion, he became a determined adversary of the papal claims, even going so far in his opposition as to accept from Bishop Richard of Verdun, a follower of the emperor, the dignity of Abbot of Verdun, after Abbot Laurentius, who supported the pope, had been quite illegally dispossessed. But he only succeeded in maintaining this position from 1111 to 1114, after which he seems to have lived in strict seclusion at Verdun as a simple monk.

== Work ==
As early as his sojourn at Dijon, probably at the instance of Abbot Jarento and Archbishop Hugh, he had begun a Latin chronicle of the world's history from the birth of Christ down to his own times (Chronicon Virdunense seu Flaviniacense). The first book, which extends to the year 1002, is little more than a loosely planned compilation, and its importance is entirely due to the fragments of older lost works which it contains. The second covers the years from 1002 to 1112 and is valuable especially for the history of Lorraine, and also for the ecclesiastical history of France.

With wide erudition Hugh collected a great mass of materials, and where his facts became too unwieldy he abandoned the annalistic form for full and detailed narrative. In this manner he brings out in relief the "Acta Gregorii VII" (papal biography of Gregory VII); "Series Abbatum Flaviniacensium" (on his predecessors as abbot of Flavigny); "Vita beati Richardi, abbatis S. Vitori" and "Vita S. Magdalvei" (two hagiographies). His account of the papal election of Victor III is a masterpiece for his period.

The 1913 Catholic Encyclopedia criticizes Hugh's lack of organization, and considers him too credulous of second-hand accounts.

== Sources ==
- A complete edition of Hugh's Chronicle is given by Georg Heinrich Pertz in the Monumenta Germaniae historica, VIII, 288–502, and in J.P. Migne's Patrologia Latina, CLIV, 21–404.
- Patrick Healy: The chronicle of Hugh of Flavigny: reform and the investiture contest in the late eleventh century. Aldershot: Ashgate, c 2006. ISBN 0-7546-5526-1; ISBN 978-0-7546-5526-8.
