= Dalmas I of Semur =

Burgundian nobleman (died 1048)

Dalmas I of Semur (French: Dalmace I^{er} de Semur, c. 980/985 - 1048) was a Burgundian nobleman.

He was the eldest son of Geoffroy I of Semur (c. 942 - c. 1000), lord of Semur-en-Brionnais, and his second wife, a daughter of Dalmace II, Viscount of Brioude (c. 935/950 - 985). Dalmas I died in 1048, at the hands of his son-in-law.

== Early life ==
He had one brother, Renaud de Semur (c. 981/985 - c. 1040) and four half-siblings:

- Geoffroy II of Semur (987 - 1037), known as "Geoffroy I de Donzy." He married Adelaide de Guînes. Geoffrey II was said to have suffered from mental illness, but recovered during a pilgrimage to visit the relics of Saint Benedict at the priory of Perrecy-les-Forges. He was the father of Raingarde de Semur
- Lambert of Semur (990 - 1065 in Toulouse)
- Thibaut de Semur, count of Chalon
- Blanche (c. 1015 - ?), in 940, married Étienne II, Vicomte of Thiern (1020 - 1060)

The contemporaries of Dalmas I thought him a man of great qualities and dubbed him "the Great." By all accounts, he had a passion for justice and was a fervent Christian. Unlike many of the local nobles, he refused to participate in the plundering of the Benedictine Abbey of Cluny. This looting was condemned by Pope Benedict VIII, who excommunicated many of the vandals.

== Murder ==
Dalmas's son-in-law was Robert I of Burgundy, a man with a violent and explosive temper. It is certain that Robert killed Dalmas in a dispute, but its root cause remains uncertain. It is unclear which method was used to kill Dalmas, but Hildebert de Lavardin, a contemporary, reported that the Duke killed his father-in-law "propia manu," which has led some historians to suppose Dalmas lost his life in battle over the territory around Auxerre. However, given that Dalmas's son Josserand was also killed by "two of the Duke's soldiers" while trying to break up a fight between Robert and his father, it seems the scene of the murder may have been more intimate. It has also been theorized - based on figures on the tympanum on the gates of Notre-Dame de Semur-en-Auxois, built sometime after 1250 - that Dalmas was poisoned during a banquet attended by his son-in-law. The construction of Notre-Dame de Semur-en-Auxois was funded by Robert I, and some wonder whether he did so in order to assuage his guilt and atone for killing his wife's father.

== Marriage and children ==
He married Aramburge, sometimes called Aramburga, de Vergy. The two of them had several children:

- 1. Héliette de Semur, also known as Helie, and sometimes mistakenly called Elvie or Hermengarde.(born about 1015 in Semur - died after 1055). In 1032, she married Robert I of Burgundy, who would later murder her father. Thereafter, she entered the Cluniac convent of the Holy Trinity at Marcigny.
- 2. Geoffroy III de Semur (born 1018/1025 - died c. 1090), 5th Count of Semur, married Alice de Guînes (c. 1030), daughter of Baldwin I, Count of Guînes. He would retire from court to the same priory as his sister, along with one of his sons and three of his daughters. He would eventually be named Holy Trinity's prior.
- 3. Hugh of Cluny (May 13, 1024 – April 28, 1109), one of the most powerful monks of the Middle Ages, and a Catholic Saint.
- 4. André de Semur, who was granted territory in the Morvan in 1063 by his brother Geoffroy, who created him Lord of Larochemillay.
- 5. Josserand de Semur (died 1048), killed by a Burgundian soldier as he tried to intervene in the dispute between his father and Robert I, the Duke of Burgundy. His killer, filled with remorse, escaped justice by confessing to Saint Hugh at Cluny, who pardoned him and admitted him to join the monastic order.
- 6. Dalmas II of Semur (died 1136 in Auxerre), called "The Younger," Lord of the Montaigu branch of Oyé and Trémont. He is often cited in the charters of his older brother Geoffroy. He had two children with an unnamed wife: Renaud de Semur, who would succeed his father as Lord Montaigu, and Hugh of Montaigu, who would become the abbot of the priory of Saint-Germain d'Auxerre, then bishop of Auxerre.
- 7. Adelaide of Semur (born c. 1055), wife of Baron Dalmas of Châtel-Montagne in Bourbonnais. Her dowry included the fiefdom of Vitry-en-Charollais and some large parcels near Briennon, much of which she donated to the Holy Trinity Priory when she joined the convent with the consent of her son Pierre de Châtel.
- 8. Matilda of Semur, called "Mahaut" (born c. 1030), who married Guichard de Bourbon-Lancy, Lord of La Motte-Saint-Jean. Once widowed, she joined the Holy Trinity Priory at Marcigny.
- 9. & 10. Cecilia and Evelle, about whom little is known.
- 11. Hermengarde of Semur, first prioress of Marcigny in 1061.
- 12. Renaud of Semur (c. 1016 - c. 1040), married to Adele of Bar-sur-Aube (c. 1010 - 1053), countess of Bar-sur-Aube.
