= Flavigny Abbey =

Abbey in Côte-d'Or, France

Coordinates: 47°30′41″N 4°31′47″E

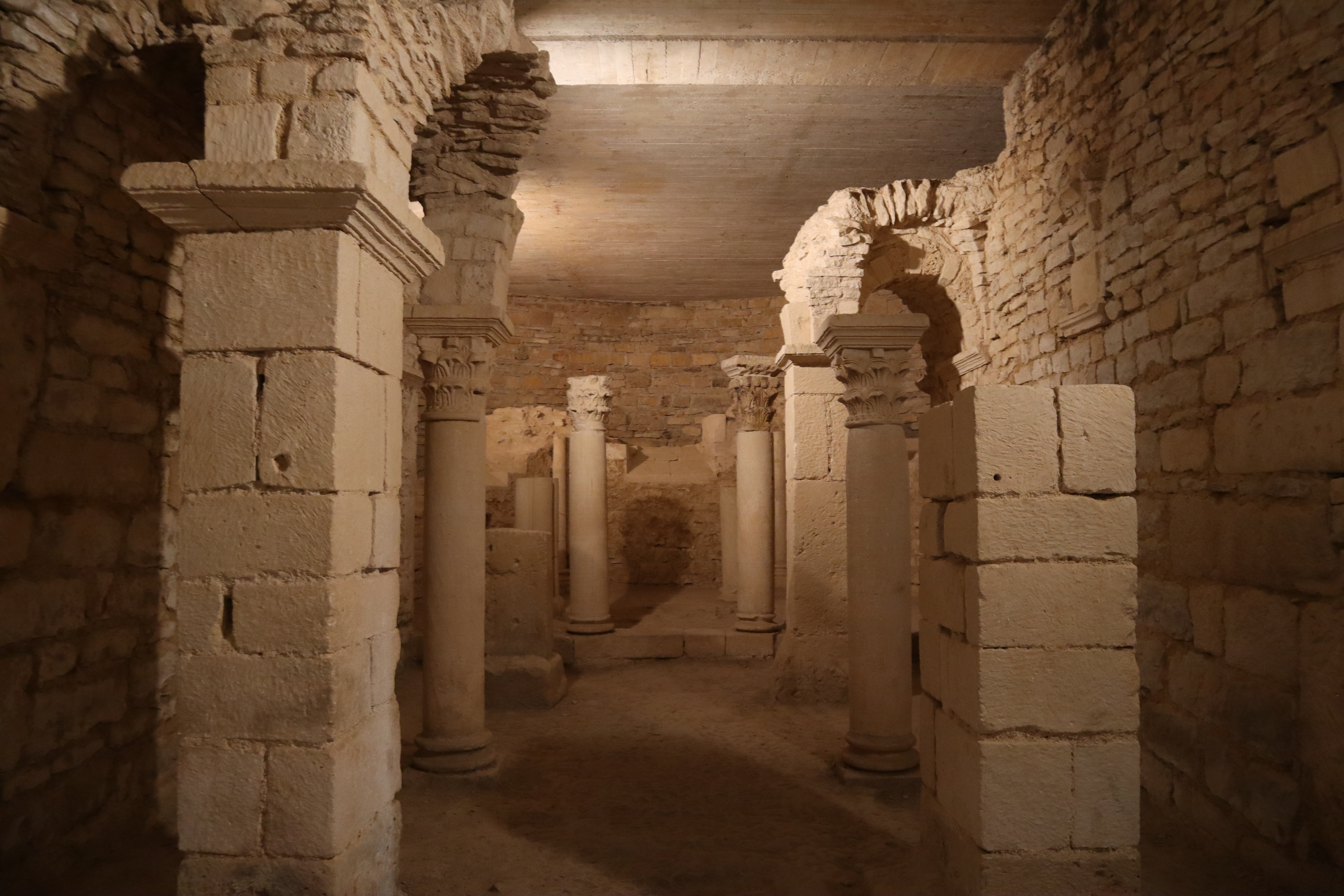
Carolingian crypt, abbey church

Flavigny Abbey is a former Benedictine monastery in Flavigny-sur-Ozerain, Côte-d'Or, France. The site is now occupied by a handcrafted candy making business.

== Benedictines ==
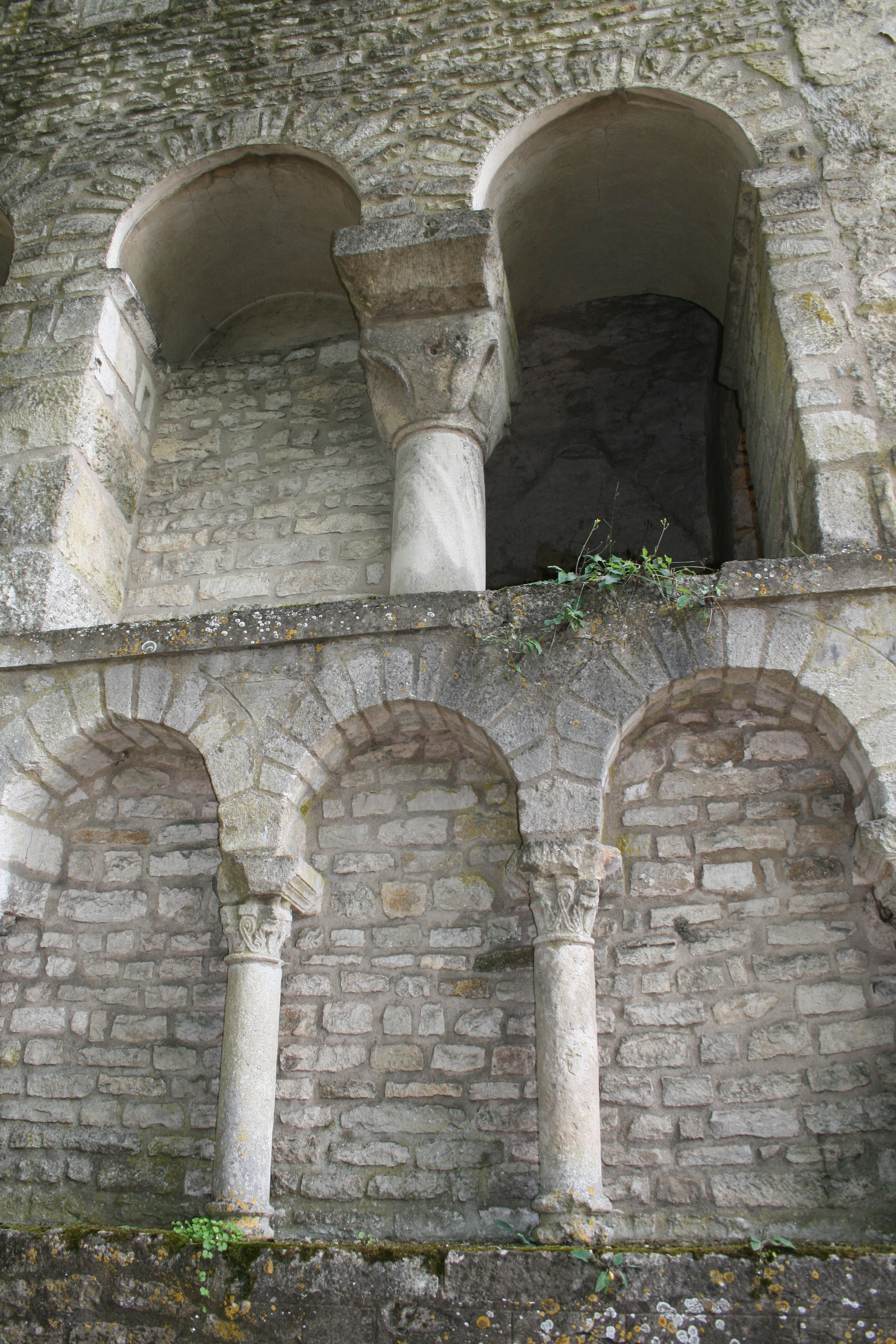
Elevations of the Carolingian crypt

This monastery was founded in 717 by Widerad, who richly endowed it. According to the authors of the Gallia Christiana the new abbey, placed under the patronage of Saint Praejectus (Prix), Bishop of Clermont, and martyr, was erected on the site of an ancient monastic foundation, dating, it is said, from the time of Clovis, and formerly under the patronage of Saint Peter, who as patron eventually overshadowed and superseded Saint Prix. Pope John VIII dedicated the new church about the year 877, from which time the patronage of Peter appears to have prevailed definitively.

The fame of Flavigny was due partly to the relics which it preserved, and partly to the piety of its monks. The monastery was at the height of its reputation in the eighth century, in the time of the Abbot Manasses, who was appointed by Pippin the Short. In 755 Manasses transferred from Volvic to Flavigny the relics of Saint Praejectus. In 760/62, Manasses attended the council of Attigny. Pippin's successor, Charlemagne, authorized Manasses to found the Carolingian style monastery of Corbigny.

Abbot Apollinaris, appointed by Charlemagne in 802, was also abbot of Saint-Bénigne de Dijon and Môutier-Saint-Jean. Charlemagne's son, Louis the Pious, used Abbot Adrevaldus as an envoy to Septimania in 834 and 838, according to the Historia Hludowici imperatoris. However, these dates do not correspond to those given in the abbey's only list, which says that Adrevaldus became abbot in 839 and ruled for three years. Eygilo, the founder of Prüm Abbey, left his own establishment to become abbot of Flavigny in 860. He set up monks at Corbigny, but later left Flavigny when he was appointed Archbishop of Sens. His successor, Geylo, resigned to become abbot of Tournus and was later appointed bishop of Langres.

At Flavigny were preserved the relics of Saint Regina, whom her acts represent as having been beheaded as a martyr in the town of Alise (since called after her Alise-Sainte-Reine). The translation of Regina (21–22 March 864) is narrated in a contemporary account.

In 877, Adalgar, the bishop of Autun (875–94), took control of Flavigny and appointed Wolfard as its abbot. This man was a brother-in-law of Louis II of Italy and had been ordained by the pope. In 880 or 881 he signed a charter of King Carloman II as the royal "protochancellor". After his death, only rectors were appointed to rule Flavigny on the bishop's behalf. The rector Girfred was accused of poisoning Adalgar at Tournus on his way to Rome. Adalgar's successors, Walo (894–919) and Hervé (919–935), continued to rule Flavigny. Walo and Hervé were the brother and son, respectively, of Count Manasses of Autun.

Episcopal rule at Flavigny continued under Bishops Rotmund (935–68), Gerald (968–77) and Walter (977–1018). Rotmund returned to the practice of appointing abbots, and of these he himself appointed no less than four. One abbot, Fulcher, was also abbot of Saint-Bénigne. Another, Milo, a nephew of the prelate Adrald, continued on as abbot under Bishops Gerald and Walter. When Milo died, Walter appoint Robert, a relative of the counts of Nevers, in his place, but Robert was removed for incompetence and transferred to the priory of Corbigny. The next abbot to be appointed, Heldric, was a Cluniac monk who restored regular monastic life to Flavigny. He was simultaneously abbot of Môutier-Saint-Jean and Saint-Germain-d'Auxerre.

Heldric's successor, Amadeus, restored abbatial control over Corbigny and established new monastic houses at Couches, Beaulieu, and Semur-en-Auxois (on the site of the present-day Collégiale). His successor, Aymo (c. 1040), was forced to resign by Pope Leo IX on account of simony. Aymo died on 26 December, year unknown. His successor, Odo I, a monk from Montiéramey, resigned after only two years in office and died on 26 August, year unknown. After the abbacy of Raynald (1084–90), a brother of Duke Odo I of Burgundy, the post was vacant for seven years, except for the two-month rule of Elmuin.

After this interregnum, the Abbot Hugh succeeded to the office. He wrote a Chronicle, a Martyrology and a Necrology, but according to church historian Henri Leclercq they "have either perished or contain few facts of real interest". Hugh owed his appointment to the influence of Archbishop Hugh of Lyon and Bishop Agano of Autun. After many conflicts, Abbot Hugh was forced to resign in 1100. His replacement was the prior, Girard.

The monastery was rebuilt in the 17th century and occupied by Benedictines of the Congregation of Saint Maur, who were actively employed in research concerning the historical documents of the abbey, but the results of their studies were lost during the French Revolution, when the abbey was dissolved.

== Anise confectionery ==
The monks at the abbey were the original makers of the aniseed confectionery. Two years after the French Revolution, the monks fled from the abbey which was sold and divided into various private properties. The former abbey was inhabited by the villagers, and some of them continued the monks' artisanal production of anise sweets. There were up to eight anise sweet producers operating at the same time, mostly in the abbey, with some others in the village.

Between 1896 and 1909, Edmond Galimard, one of the anise sweet producers, acquired the various production units and combined them to create a single workshop within the former abbey, as there had been under the monks. The name Troubat first appears in the history of Anis de Flavigny in 1923 when Jean acquired the factory. His son Nicolas Troubat took over in 1965, and Catherine Troubat took over in 1990 as the third generation.

== Abbots ==
- Magoald, abbot from 717, died on 24 July year unknown
- Gayroinus, abbot in 748, died 6 July 755. According to Hugh of Flavigny, he died on a mission for Charlemagne.
- Manasses, abbot from 755, died in office 5 November 787
- Adaloald, abbot 787–91
- Zacho, abbot from 791, died in office 9 May 795
- Alcuin, abbot 795–802, resigned
- Apollinaris, abbot from 802, died in office 1 April 826
- Vigilius, abbot from 828 after a two-year vacancy
- Adrevaldus, abbot from 834 or 839, perhaps until 842
- Marianus, abbot from 840/41 or 845
- Vulfald, dates unknown, succeeded Marianus
- Warin, lay rector in 849
  - Sarulf, dean under Warin
- Goser, died 855
- Hugh, abbot 856–60
- Eigil, abbot 860–865
- Geylo, abbot 866–70
- Sigard, abbot from 870 until at least 872
- Abbey controlled by the Diocese of Autun from 877 until 992
  - Wolfard, abbot circa 880, died 6 September year unknown
  - Girfred, rector in 894
  - Otbert, prelate during 894–919
  - Raingus, prelate during 894–919
  - Gausarius, prelate during 919–35
  - Raino, abbot during 935–68
  - Wichard, abbot during 935–68, died 14 June year unknown
  - Fulcher, abbot after 935, died 28 April 955
  - Adrald, prelate in 966
  - Milo, abbot during 955–92, died 5 December year unknown
  - Robert, abbot during 977–92
- Heldric, abbot from 992, died in office 14 December 1009
- Amadeus, abbot from 1010 until at least 1037, died 19 March year unknown
- Aymo, abbot until 1049
- Odo I, abbot 1049–51
- Odo II, abbot from 1051, died in office 9 August 1084
- Raynald, abbot from 1084, died in office 10 February 1090
- Elmuin abbot for two months during 1090–97
- Hugh, abbot 1097–1100
- Girard, abbot from 1100 until at least 1113
