= Sweyn the Crusader =

11th-century Danish prince

- Born: c. 1050
- Died: 1097; Philomelium (modern-day Akşehir, Turkey)
- Spouse: Florine of Burgundy
- House: Estridsen
- Father: Sweyn II of Denmark

Sweyn the Crusader (Danish: Svend Korsfarer); c. 1050 – 1097 at Philomelium (modern-day Akşehir, Turkey) was a Danish crusader.

== Biography ==
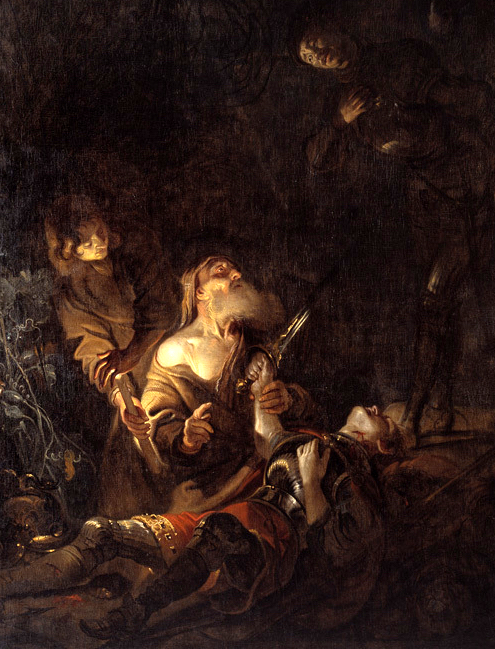
Prince Sweyn's body was found around 1645, a painting by Karel van Mander III, at the National Gallery of Denmark

Sweyn was born in Denmark, a son of King Sweyn II of Denmark, and husband of Florine of Burgundy. He is famous for his participation in the First Crusade, which he primarily spent fighting the Turks. On his way to Jerusalem in 1097, he and 1,500 other Danish knights were attacked by the Turks. The Danes lost the battle, and Sweyn the Crusader with his wife Florine of Burgundy was killed.

== Source ==
- Albert von Aachen (12th century). Historia Hierosolymitanae expeditionis. Recueil des historiens des croisades (1879).
