= Sibylla of Burgundy, Duchess of Burgundy =

Sybilla
- Duchess consort of Burgundy
- Born: 1060
- Died: 1103 (aged 42–43)
- Noble family: House of Ivrea (by birth); House of Burgundy (by marriage)
- Spouse: Eudes I, Duke of Burgundy
- Issue: Florine of Burgundy; Helie of Burgundy; Hugh II, Duke of Burgundy
- Father: William I, Count of Burgundy
- Mother: Stephanie

Sybilla of Burgundy (c. 1060–1103), was a French noble, Duchess consort of Burgundy by marriage to Eudes I, Duke of Burgundy.

She was a daughter of William I, Count of Burgundy and Stephanie. She was married to Eudes I, Duke of Burgundy in 1080.

Children:

- Florine of Burgundy
- Helie of Burgundy
- Hugh II, Duke of Burgundy
- Henry (died 1131)
- Emma of Burgundy (1082–1120)
- Alix of Burgundy (1102–1142)

| Preceded by Sibille of Nevers | Duchess of Burgundy; 1080–1103 | Succeeded by Felicia-Matilda of Mayenne |
