= Robert I of Burgundy =

Duke of Burgundy from 1032 to 1076

Robert I
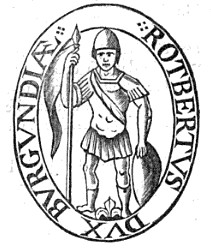

Duke of Burgundy
- Reign: 1032–1076
- Predecessor: Henry
- Successor: Hugh I
- Born: 1011
- Died: 21 March 1076; Fleurey-sur-Ouche
- Spouse: Helie of Semur; Ermengarde of Anjou
- Issue detail: Henry of Burgundy; Constance, Queen of León; Hugh; Robert; Simon; Hildegarde, Duchess of Aquitaine
- House: House of Burgundy (founder)
- Dynasty: Capetian Dynasty
- Father: Robert II of France
- Mother: Constance of Arles

Robert I (1011 – 21 March 1076), known as the Old or the Headstrong (Old French: Tête-Hardi), was Duke of Burgundy from 1032 to his death. Robert was the third son of King Robert II of France and Constance of Arles. His brother was Henry I of France.

== Life ==
In 1025, with the death of his eldest brother Hugh Magnus, he and Henry rebelled against their father and defeated him, forcing him back to Paris. In 1031, after the death of his father the king, Robert participated in a rebellion against his brother, in which he was supported by his mother, Constance of Arles. Peace was only achieved when Robert was given Burgundy (1032).

Throughout his reign, he was little more than a robber baron who had no control over his vassals, whose estates he often plundered, especially those of the Church. He seized the income of the diocese of Autun and the wine of the canons of Dijon. He burgled the abbey of St-Germain at Auxerre. In 1048, he repudiated his wife, Helie of Semur followed by the assassination of her brother Joceran and the murdering of her father, Lord Dalmace I of Semur, with his own hands. In that same year, the bishop of Langres, Harduoin, refused to dedicate the church of Sennecy so as not "to be exposed to the violence of the duke."

His first son, Hugh, died in battle at a young age and his second son, Henry, also predeceased him. He was succeeded by Henry's eldest son, his grandson, Hugh I.

== Family ==
He married his first wife, Helie of Semur, about 1033, and repudiated her in 1048. Helie was the daughter of Dalmas I of Semur. Robert and Helie had five children:

1. Hugh (1034–1059), killed in battle
2. Henry (1035–ca.1074). He died shortly before his father. His children included Hugh I, Duke of Burgundy (1057–1093), Odo I, Duke of Burgundy (1058–1103), and Henry, Count of Portugal (1066–1112), among others
3. Robert (1040–1113), poisoned; married Violante, daughter of Roger I of Sicily
4. Simon (1045–1087)
5. Constance (1046–1093), married Alfonso VI of León and Castile

From his second wife, Ermengarde, daughter of Fulk III of Anjou, he had one daughter:

1. Hildegarde (c.1056–1104), married William VIII of Aquitaine

== Sources ==
- Bouchard, Constance Brittain (1987). Sword, Miter, and Cloister: Nobility and the Church of Burgundy, 980-1198. Cornell University Press.
- Duby, Georges (1981). The Knight, the Lady and the Priest. University of Chicago Press.
- Hallam, Elizabeth (1980). Capetian France:987-1328. Longman Group Ltd.
- Gwatking, H. M., Whitney, J. P., et al. Cambridge Medieval History: Volume III—Germany and the Western Empire. Cambridge University Press: London, 1930.

Robert I of Burgundy House of Burgundy Cadet branch of the Capetian dynasty Born: 1011 Died: 2 March 1076
Preceded by Henry	Duke of Burgundy; 1032 – 1076	Succeeded by Hugh I
