= Primat of Saint-Denis =

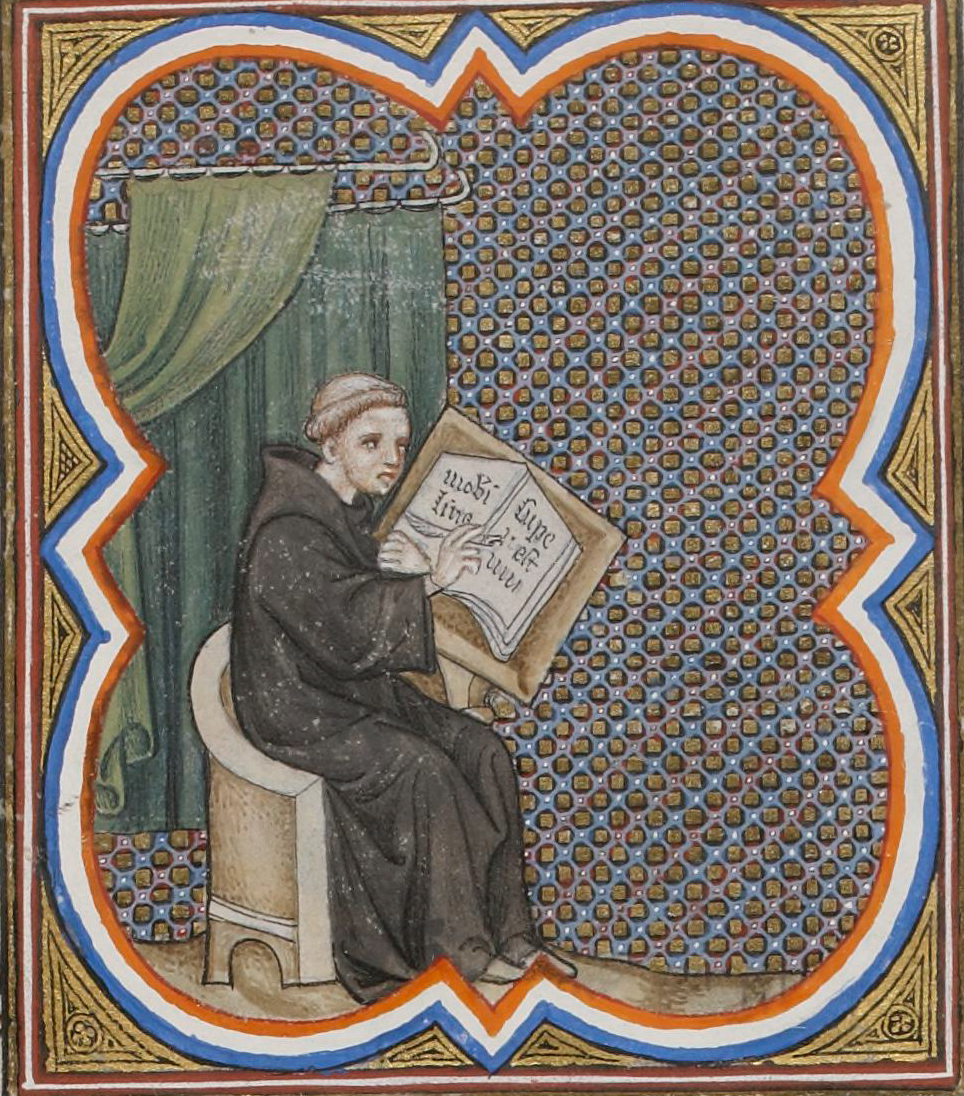
Primat writing the Roman des rois, from the Grandes Chroniques de France, BnF, MS fr. 2813, folio 265v (c.1375×c.1380)

Primat (died c. 1277) was a French Benedictine monk and historian of the abbey of Saint-Denis near Paris. He composed two histories of France with a royal focus, one in Latin and the other in Old French. His Latin chronicle covers the years 1248 to 1277 but now survives only in an Old French translation and in excerpts incorporated into the works of others. It contains a detailed account of the reign of Louis IX, making it one of the most important contemporary sources for that reign. His French chronicle, the Roman des rois, covers the entire history of France down to 1223. It was completed around 1274 for Philip III and its presentation copy is extant. It is the earliest version of what would become the Grandes Chroniques de France, the first official history of France.

Long regarded as a mere scribe or translator, the 20th-century discovery that he authored a Latin chronicle spurred a reassessment of his role in creating the Grandes Chroniques. Together the influence of these works make him one of the most important authors in 13th-century France.

== Life ==
Of the life of Primat, almost nothing is known. Given the rarity of his name, the translator is almost certainly the same person as the Robert Primat who witnessed a charter of Saint-Denis in 1270. A wife of Primat, almost certainly the translator, was receiving an annual pension worth 50 sous from the abbey between 1284 and 1297. This notice suggests that Primat had separated from his wife to become a monk. That his Latin chronicle appears to have ended abruptly in 1277 in the middle of the reign of Philip III suggests that Primat died at that time or shortly after.

== Works ==
=== Latin chronicle ===
Primat's Latin history survives only in part in an Old French translation by Jean de Vignay. The original Latin is lost. Jean's translation was made for Queen Joan the Lame around 1335. It survives in a single manuscript, now in London, British Library, Bibl. Reg. 19 D.i. It appears that Primat's chronicle only covered the years 1248–1277 and was a continuation of the chronicle of Gilon of Reims. It was thus part of a series of royal histories produced at Saint-Denis.

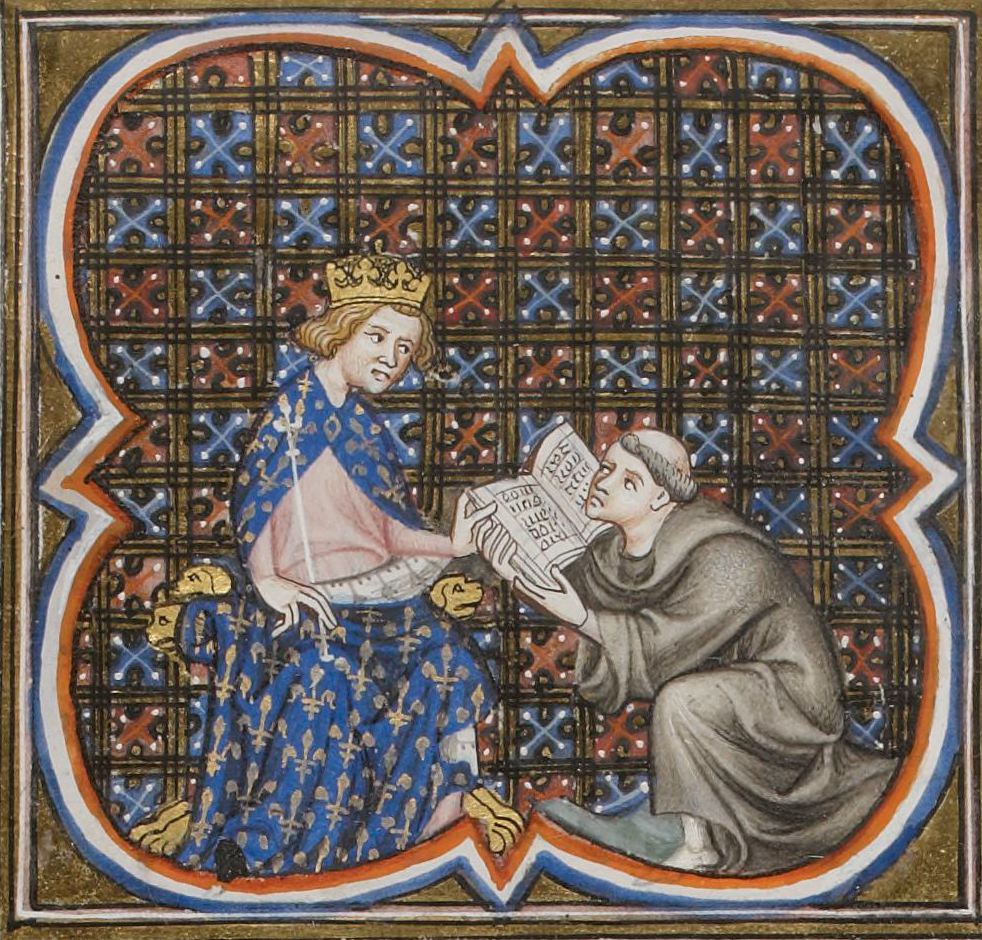
A presentation miniature showing Primat giving the Roman des rois to Philip III, from the Grandes Chroniques de France, BnF, MS fr. 2813, folio 260v (c.1375×c.1380)

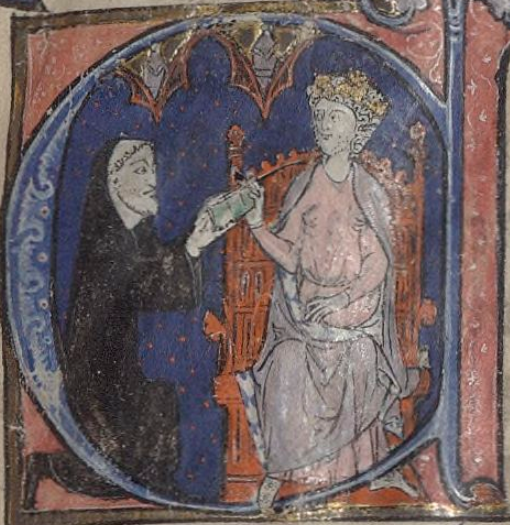
A presentation miniature showing Primat giving the Roman des rois to Philip III, from the original presentation copy of the Grandes Chroniques de France, Bibliothèque Sainte-Geneviève, MS 782, folio 1r (1274)

Jean translated Primat as an addendum to his translation of the Speculum historiale of Vincent of Beauvais running from 1250 until 1277, but it does not actually appear alongside the Speculum in any manuscript. The anonymous Chronicle of Baldwin of Avesnes also uses Primat as a source in this way. Guillaume de Nangis, in his Vita Ludovici IX, borrows directly from Primat without citing him, apparently because he considered his work just an extension of Gilon's. Although Jean de Vignay states that Primat's chronicle ran down to 1285, it appears from comparison with Baldwin of Avesnes and Guillaume de Nangis that the work of Primat ended in 1277 and what Jean had in front of him was a copy of Primat with a short continuation down to 1285. It was once commonly thought that the first part of Primat's chronicle, covering the first half of the reign of Louis IX, was lost, but it is as likely that his chronicle began where that of Gilon ended.

Gabrielle Spiegel proposes that a first redaction of Primat's work, limited to the reign of Louis IX, appeared in the year of the monarch's death (1270); that Primat's death prevented him from completing a history of the reign of Philip III; that a second redaction of his chronicle down to 1277 was put together after his death but before 1280; and that a third and final redaction down to the end of Philip's reign in 1285 was only completed after 1307 by borrowing material from Guillaume de Nangis's Chronicon. Auguste Molinier suggests that the original chronicle ended with the disgrace of Pierre de la Broce in 1278.

=== Old French chronicle ===
Primat's Old French chronicle, Roman des rois ("Romance of Kings"), was presented to Philip III in about 1274. It was probably commissioned by the king's father, Louis IX. Primat's abbot, Matthew of Vendôme, also had a large role in its production and is a more imposing figure than the king in the original presentation miniature. It was created by translating and adapting excerpts from various Latin histories in the archives of Saint-Denis.

The main source was a compendium of Latin histories from Saint-Denis copied about 1250 and now in Paris, Bibliothèque nationale de France, lat. 5925. This contained the Liber historiae Francorum; the Gesta Dagoberti; two works by Sigebert of Gembloux, the Chronographia and the Vita Sigeberti III; Aimon of Fleury's De gestis regum Francorum with its continuation; Einhard's Vita Karoli Magni and Annales; the chronicle of Pseudo-Turpin; Hugh of Fleury's Historia regum Francorum with its continuation; William of Jumièges's Gesta Normannorum ducum with its continuation; Suger's lives of Louis VI and Louis VII; Rigord's life of Philip Augustus; and William the Breton's Gesta Philippi Augusti.

The original presentation copy of the Roman des rois is generally thought to be Paris, Bibliothèque Sainte-Geneviève, MS 782, which is illustrated with thirty-four miniatures. This manuscript was certainly owned by Charles V, who had a continuation added to it. Primat's text thus came to be the earliest version of the Grandes Chroniques de France. Only three copies of his Roman survive without continuations: London, British Library, Add. MS 38128; Brussels, Bibliothèque royale, MS 4; and a manuscript in a private Swiss collection. The first two were made between 1285 and 1314, while the Swiss copy was made in the 1320s or 1330s.

The Roman des rois was organized around genealogy with an eye to demonstrating political continuity in France. It covers the Merovingian, Carolingian and Capetian dynasties down to the end of the reign of Philip Augustus (1223). It therefore did not overlap with his Latin chronicle. Its reliability is highly dependent on Primat's sources. The Roman becomes simpler from the early 11th century, when the complex account of Aimoin comes to an end. Thereafter it tends to rely on a single source for its narrative at any time. From the reign of Louis VI on, it relies on contemporary histories.

Primat's Latin chronicle became a source for the first continuation of the Grandes Chroniques de France, much of its text appearing verbatim (in translation) there.

== Bibliography ==
- Brun, Laurent (2016). "Primat". In Graeme Dunphy; Cristian Bratu (eds.). Encyclopedia of the Medieval Chronicle. Brill Online. doi:10.1163/2213-2139_emc_SIM_02098.
- Caillet, Jean-Pierre (2015). "Le Roman des rois de Primat (Paris, Bibliothèque Sainte-Geneviève, ms. 782): une première interprétation imagée de l'histoire de France". Hortus Artium Medievalium. 21: 41–53. doi:10.1484/j.ham.5.107377.
- Hedeman, Anne D. (1991). The Royal Image: Illustrations of the Grandes Chroniques de France, 1274–1422. University of California Press.
- Jones, Chris (2007). Eclipse of Empire? Perceptions of the Western Empire and its Rulers in Late-Medieval France. Brepols.
- Jordan, William Chester (2009). A Tale of Two Monasteries: Westminster and Saint-Denis in the Thirteenth Century. Princeton University Press.
- Knowles, Christine M. (1953). The Life and Work of Jean de Vignay (PhD dissertation). Birkbeck College, University of London.
- Molinier, Auguste (1903). "Primat, moine de Saint-Denis (note bibliographique)". Collections numériques de la Sorbonne. 3: 101.
- Spiegel, Gabrielle M. (1974). Studies in the Chronicle Tradition of Saint-Denis (PhD dissertation). The Johns Hopkins University. ProQuest 7429017
