= Saint Dagobert =

Saint Dagobert may refer to:

- Dagobert II, king of Austrasia from 675/6 until 679. He was assassinated and came to be regarded as a martyr. He was buried at Stenay, where a basilica was erected in the 9th century. He appears in some martyrologies from the later 10th century. No later than the 11th century, he had a hagiography, the Vita Dagoberti.
- Dagobert I, king of the Franks from 623 until 639. The only evidence of his cultus is the Gesta Dagoberti, written at the abbey of Saint-Denis in the early 830s. He was seemingly not regarded as a saint anywhere else.
