= Helinand =

Helinand (Latin: Helinandus) may refer to:

- Helinand of Froidmont (fl. c. 1150 – c. 1230), monk, poet and chronicler
- Helinand of Laon, bishop (1052–1096)
- Helinand of Perseigne (fl. c. 1200), monk and theologian

== See also ==
- Elinand of Tiberias, Prince of Galilee
