= Matthew of Vendôme (abbot) =

French abbot

A presentation miniature depicting Matthew (centre, mitred) standing over the monk Primat (kneeling), who wrote the text and hands it to the king (seated, crowned) while the royal court and three monks look on.

Matthew of Vendôme (French: Mathieu de Vendôme) was the abbot of Saint-Denis from 1258 until 1286 and one of the regents of France from 1270 until 1271.

Born around 1222, Matthew was a native of Vendôme. Although he is often said to have been a relative of the counts of Vendôme, there is no evidence of this. He most likely entered Saint-Denis out of devotion to Saint Denis, whose cult was kept at the parish church of Thoré in the Vendômois. This church had once been a property of Saint-Denis, but in 1060 it was acquired by the Abbey of La Trinité in Vendôme. It is possible that Matthew first professed as a monk at La Trinité before transferring to Saint-Denis. He was at Saint-Denis by the mid-1240s, for in 1282 he testified to a commission of inquiry into the sainthood of King Louis IX that the king had visited the abbey before the Seventh Crusade (1248–1254).

In 1258, Matthew was elected to succeed Abbot Henri Mallet, under whose rule the monastery had gained a reputation for laxity. He sent a delegation to Rome to obtain confirmation, as required of abbeys directly subject to the Holy See. Pope Alexander IV also released him from the debts racked up by his predecessor, while Louis IX relieved the abbey of the duty of providing hospitality (gîte) to the king and his household. Before the end of the year Matthew had received consecration from the archbishop of Sens.

Along with Simon of Nesle, Matthew acted as regent of France during Louis IX's absence on the Eighth Crusade in 1270. Louis set out on his crusade from the abbey, taking the Oriflamme from the altar and receiving the abbot's blessing. Matthew continued as regent after Louis's death on crusade until the return of his son, Philip III. He served as Philip's chief minister and "handled the day-to-day administration" until the king's death in 1285.

Matthew was a notable patron of art and letters. He initiated a program of tomb refurbishment, possibly at the instigation of Louis IX, to bolster Saint-Denis's position as the royal necropolis. The tombs were completed in 1267, safeguarding the abbey as the preferred site for royal burial against the claims of Royaumont Abbey. Under Matthew, Saint-Denis produced the first redaction of the illustrated vernacular royal history of France, the Grandes Chroniques de France. The presentation copy given to Philip III in 1274 still survives. The production of this work was certainly overseen personally by Matthew.

== Bibliography ==
- Caillet, Jean-Pierre (2015). "Le Roman des rois de Primat (Paris, Bibliothèque Sainte-Geneviève, ms. 782): une première interprétation imagée de l'histoire de France". Hortus Artium Medievalium. 21: 41–53. doi:10.1484/j.ham.5.107377.
- Hedeman, Anne D. (1991). The Royal Image: Illustrations of the Grandes Chroniques de France, 1274–1422. University of California Press.
- Jordan, William Chester (2009). A Tale of Two Monasteries: Westminster and Saint-Denis in the Thirteenth Century. Princeton University Press.
- Lower, Michael (2018). The Tunis Crusade of 1270: A Mediterranean History. Oxford University Press.
- Wright, Georgia Sommers (1974). "A Royal Tomb Program in the Reign of St. Louis". The Art Bulletin. 56 (2): 224–243. doi:10.1080/00043079.1974.10790033.
