= Speculum literature =

Medieval literary genre

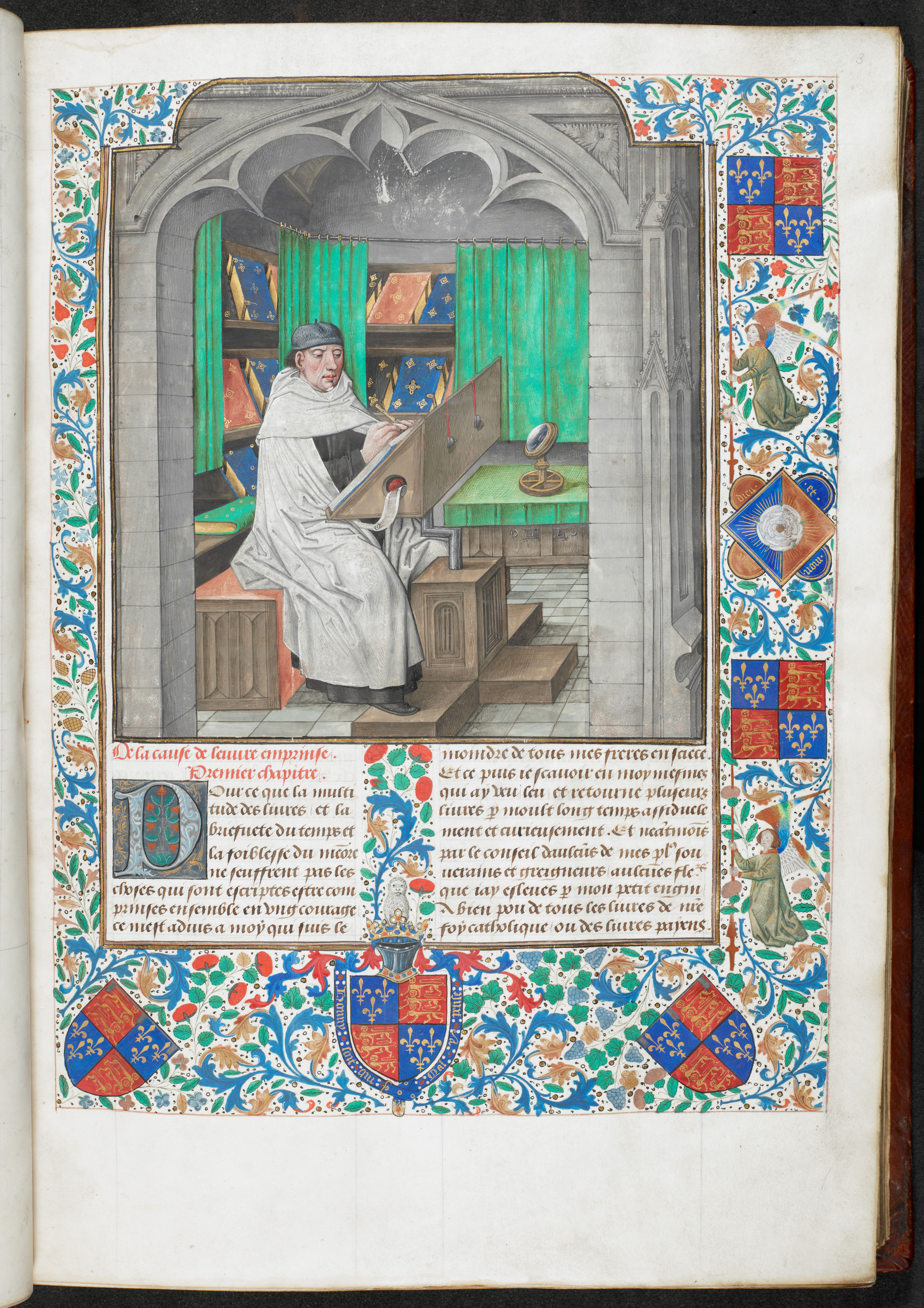
This author portrait of Vincent of Beauvais in a manuscript of his Speculum Historiale, contains an actual convex mirror as a visual pun. French translation by Jean de Vignay, Bruges, c. 1478–1480, for Edward IV; British Library

The medieval genre of speculum literature, popular from the twelfth through the sixteenth centuries, was inspired by the urge to encompass encyclopedic knowledge within a single work. However, some of these works have a restricted scope and function as instructional manuals. In this sense, the encyclopedia and the speculum are similar but they are not the same genre.

== Specula as a genre ==
Specula often offered mirrors of history, doctrine, or morals. Vincent of Beauvais' Speculum Maius which included the Mirror of Nature, Mirror of History, and Mirror of Doctrine is not often described as a core representative of the genre. One historian has surmised that this is because Vincent's work was intended to be an objective work which is at odds with speculum literature, since it "is a subjective genre". More usual members are found in this list:

- Honorius Augustodunensis' Imago mundi (cited by Vincent of Beauvais as Speculum mundi) and Speculum Ecclesiae (different than the Speculum Ecclesiae by Edmund Rich)
- An anonymous Speculum virginum
- William of Saint-Thierry's Speculum fidei
- Nigel de Longchamps's Speculum stultorum

== Specific works whose titles include the word speculum ==
- Speculum Alchimiae, the "Mirror of Alchemy", written by Roger Bacon.
- Speculum astronomiae, written by Albertus Magnus.
- Speculum ecclesiae, the "Mirror of the Church", written by Edmund Rich.
- Speculum Humanae Salvationis, the "Mirror of human salvation", written c. 1309–24, perhaps by Ludolph of Saxony.
- Speculum judiciale, or Speculum iuris, the "Mirror for Judges", written by Guillaume Durand.
- Speculum meditantis, the "Mirror of Meditations" (usually known by its French title Mirour de l'Omme), written by John Gower.
- Speculum perfectionis, written by Brother Leo.
- Speculum stultorum, the "Mirror of Fools" written by Nigel de Longchamps
- Speculum Vitae Humanae, written by Rodericus Zamorensis (Rodrigo Sanchez de Arevalo)
- Speculum Regale, King's mirror, Konungs skuggsjá, written in the mid 13th century in Norway

Ormulum, written by a certain Orm in Central England, bears an indirect reference to speculum and may be translated as "Orm's Mirror". It is universal in contents in that it contains the appropriate homiletic materials throughout the Church calendar.

The English word mirror appears in William Caxton's Myrrour of the Worlde (1490), one of the first illustrated books printed in English (a translation of L'image du Monde, an overview of the sciences); in the oft-republished A Mirror for Magistrates (1559); and in The Miroir or Glasse of the Synneful Soul, a manuscript translation from the French by the young Queen Elizabeth I of England. The fourteenth-century mystic Marguerite Porete's Mirouer des simples âmes, The Mirror of Simple Souls is a devotional work that explores the seven stages of the soul's mystical "annihilation" through meditation and prayer.

The Speculum Romanae Magnificentiae ("Mirror of the Magnificence of Rome") was a Renaissance "coffee table book" of prints of the sights of Rome, especially the antiquities, produced by the French print seller and publisher Antonio Lafreri (1512–1577). He had been publishing and distributing such prints, and selling them at his shop in Rome, since the 1540s. In the 1570s he hit on the idea of producing a title page for the albums of prints he also sold. Each copy of the Speculum may have had different contents, as the customer in Rome could make his own selection in the shop and have them bound up.

In modern times, the journal Speculum, published by the Medieval Academy of America, covers every aspect of the medieval world.

== See also ==
- Mirrors for princes or specula principum
