= Vita Dagoberti =

The Vita Dagoberti ('Life of Dagobert') is an anonymous Latin biography of Dagobert III, king of the Franks (711–716). It is unreliable as a historical source. Confusing Dagobert III and the assassinated Dagobert II, the author mistakenly treats Dagobert III as a Christian martyr. The Vita is thus a saint's life, although its subject was not a saint.

== Manuscripts and dating ==
The Vita is preserved in two manuscripts, one of the twelfth century and one of the thirteenth. The earlier is Paris, BnF, MS lat. 6263, and the Vita is the only work it contains. The second is Paris, BnF, MS lat. 9422. According to its prologue, it was written for the "brothers" of the basilica of Saint-Dagobert in Stenay so that they would have something to read every year on their patron saint's feast, 23 December. The brothers claimed that they knew nothing of his martyrdom and feared that all knowledge of his life would soon be lost.

There are different theories on the dating of the Vita. Paul Fouracre argues that it was composed after 1069, the year in which the church of Stenay was transferred to the monastery of Gorze, upgraded to a priory and its secular canons replaced by Benedictine monks. He bases this on a note added to the twelfth-century manuscript: scripta a monacho Satanaco ('written by a monk of Stenay'). Claude Carozzi, on the other hand, argues that it was written between 893 and 900, that is, between the coronation of Charles the Simple and the death of Archbishop Fulk of Reims. He bases this largely on internal considerations, especially the text's interest in the abbey of Saint-Wandrille and its dependence on sources from the abbey of Saint-Bertin, of which Fulk had been abbot. Ian Wood dates it to the late tenth century.

== Sources and synopsis ==
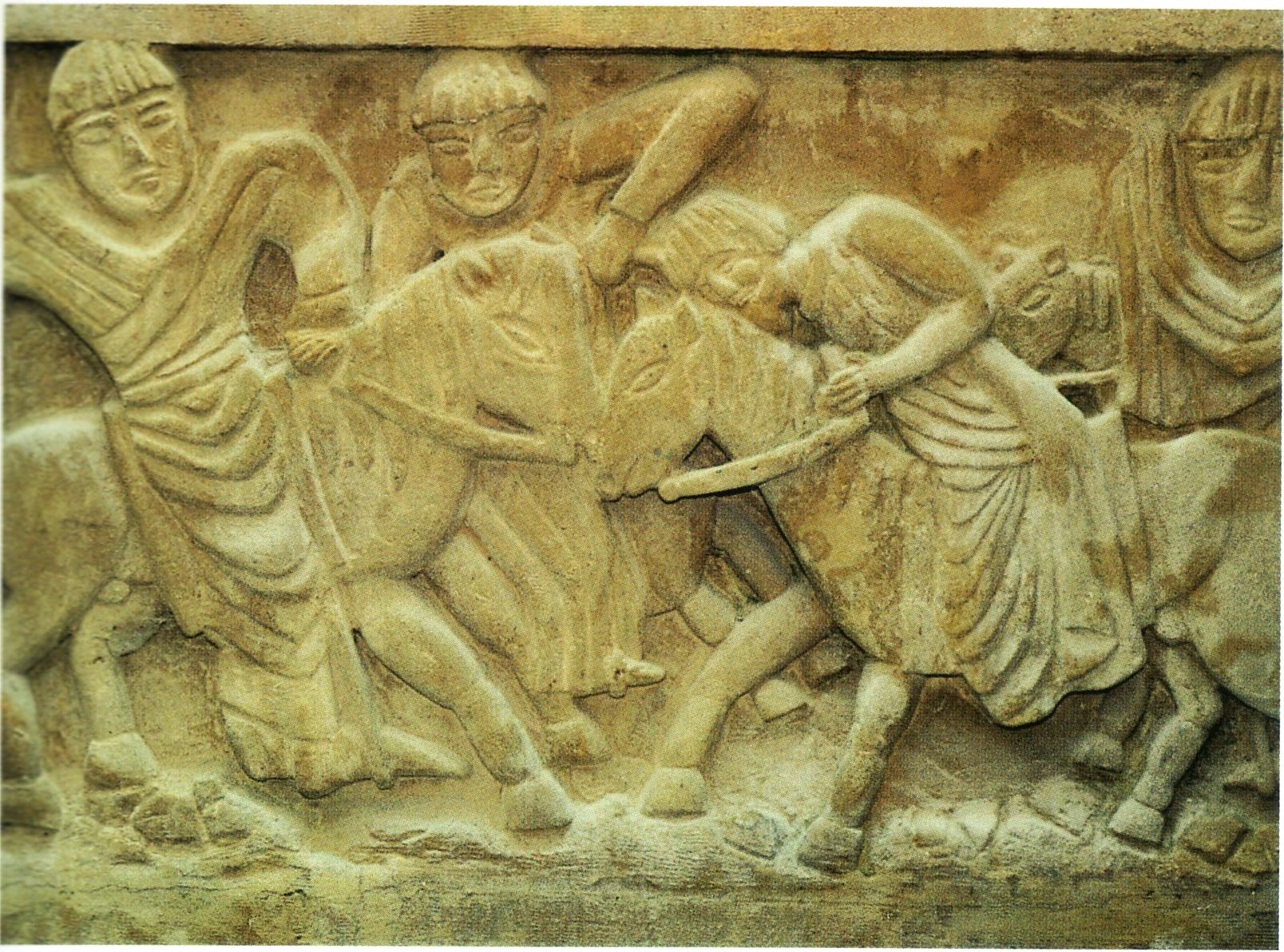
Carving depicting the murder of Dagobert from the crypt of the Saint-Dagobert in Stenay. This scene is not that of the Vita.

The author of the Vita quotes directly from the Deeds of Dagobert I, the first continuation of the Chronicle of Fredegar, the Liber Historiae Francorum, Paul the Deacon's History of the Lombards and the Deeds of the Abbots of Saint-Wandrille. Other sources which the author used but does not quote or cite explicitly include the Earlier Annals of Metz, Einhard's Life of Charlemagne, Willibald's Life of Boniface and Alcuin's Life of Willibrord.

The Vita begins with an account of Dagobert III's father, Childebert III, drawn from the Liber Historiae. He is said to have built many churches and won many victories. Dagobert was raised by Balthild, whom the Vita calls his grandmother. He is described as pious, wise, vigorous and beautiful. He was crowned at Reims and his reign was one of internal peace. He made a gift to Saint-Denis and awarded the disputed abbey of Fleury-en-Vexin to Abbot Hugh of Saint-Wandrille after it had been taken by the mayor of the palace Childeric. He accompanied Charles Martel on an expedition into Frisia in support of the missionary Willibrord. There he miraculously freed some prisoners-of-war with the help of his archchaplain Boniface. He is also credited with a miraculous growth of wheat.

One day, while hunting in the Ardennes, Dagobert and his godson became separated from their companions. While taking a nap, Dagobert dreamed that, while walking in a meadow, he crossed a stream over an iron bridge and came upon a building full of treasure. When he awoke, he told his godson of the dream. His godson told him that while he was asleep, a reptile came out of his mouth. The godson helped the reptile cross a stream by laying down his sword. The reptile then entered an oak tree before returning to Dagobert's mouth. When Dagobert fell back to his sleep, his godson stabbed him with a spear and went in search of the treasure. He could not enter the oak tree and was struck down and died.

The Vita contains only one posthumous miracle brought about by the intercession of Dagobert. A woman whose hand got stuck to the distaff while spinning on his feast day was miraculously saved.

== Analysis ==
The Vita contains many historical inaccuracies. At root, it is based on a misconception. The Dagobert who had given rise to a martyr cult was the obscure Dagobert II (675–679), but the author of the Vita did not even know of the existence of another Dagobert between Dagobert I (623–639) and Dagobert III. His work thus assumes Dagobert III to have been martyred.

In other respects, the author was "cavalier with his material". Balthild could not have raised Dagobert III, as she was in fact his great-grandmother and was dead before he was born. Fleury was taken by King Childeric II and the dispute over it was resolved after Dagobert III's death. Hugh did not even become abbot until 723. That Dagobert III's reign was peaceful is contradicted by the Liber Historiae, which records how a Frankish civil war broke out in 714 after the death of the mayor of the palace Pippin II. Indeed, the reference to peace may be the only information in the work actually derived from a source about Dagobert II. In the History of the Lombards, it is recorded how in 676 Dagobert II made peace with the Lombards. The martyrdom of Dagobert III is directly contradicted by the Liber Historiae, which says that he "took ill and died". The account of Dagobert's dream is based on the account of King Guntram's dream in the History of the Lombards. In the latter source, however, Guntram awakes and finds the treasure.

The Vita is notable for its "post-Carolingian" outlook. It ignores all the Carolingian historiography that sought to denigrate the Merovingian dynasty of the Dagoberts in favour of the Carolingian mayors of the palace. Its presentation of the Merovingians as a "most robust people" (gens robustissima) is totally at odds with the standard Carolingian view. The interpretation of the complete sidelining of the Carolingians depends in part on the dating of the work. Carozzi, dating it to the 890s, considered it a "political testament" of Fulk in favour of the Carolingian Charles the Simple. If correct, this would show that the earlier discourse on Carolingian origins was largely irrelevant by the late Carolingian period. On the other hand, a late date may show that an anti-Carolingian spirit pervaded the region after the failed attempts of the Carolingian duke Charles of Lower Lorraine to seize the French throne with German support after 987.

In its presentation of Dagobert as a saint and miracle-worker, the Vita Dagoberti is "the text that comes closest to showing us a Merovingian sacral king".

== Editions ==
- Krusch, Bruno [in German], ed. (1888). Vita Dagoberti III regis Francorum. MGH. Vol. Scriptores rerum Merovingicarum 2. Hanover. pp. 509–524.

== Bibliography ==
- Carozzi, Claude [in French] (1984). "La vie de saint Dagobert de Stenay: histoire et hagiographie". Revue belge de Philologie et d'Histoire. 62 (2): 225–258. doi:10.3406/rbph.1984.3460.
- Dierkens, Alain (1984). "Note sur un passage de la Vita Dagoberti: Dagobert II et le domaine de Biesme" (PDF). Revue belge de Philologie et d'Histoire. 62 (2): 259–270. doi:10.3406/rbph.1984.3461.
- Fouracre, Paul J. (2008). "Forgetting and Remembering Dagobert II: The English Connection". In Paul J. Fouracre; David Ganz (eds.). Frankland: The Franks and the World of the Early Middle Ages. Manchester: Manchester University Press. pp. 70–89.
- Wood, Ian N. (2003). "Deconstructing the Merovingian Family". In Richard Corradini; Maximilian Diesenberger; Helmut Reimitz (eds.). The Construction of Communities in the Early Middle Ages: Texts, Resources and Artefacts. Leiden: Brill. pp. 149–171. ISBN 9789004118621.
