= Guillaume de Nangis =

Guillaume de Nangis (died 1300), also known as William of Nangis, was a French chronicler.

William was a monk in the Abbey of St. Denis to the north of Paris. About 1285 he was placed in charge of the abbey library as custos cartarum, and he died in June or July 1300. Having doubtless done some work on the Latin manuscripts on which the Grandes Chroniques de France are based, William wrote a long Chronicon, dealing with the history of the world from the creation until 1300. For the period before 1113 this work merely repeats that of Sigebert of Gembloux and others; but after this date it contains some new and valuable material. The chronicle had later continuations by other authors, though the so-called "second continuation", by Jean de Venette, which takes events up to 1368, was not a continuation of the Chronicon but rather an independent chronicle that happened to be bound into the same manuscript as the Nangis chronicle.

William's other writings are: Gesta Ludovici IX; Gesta Philippi III, sive Audacis; Chronicon abbreviatum regum Francorum; and a French translation of the same work written for the laity. Making use of the large store of manuscripts at Saint Denis, William was a compiler rather than an author, and with the exception of the latter part of the Chronicon his writings do not add materially to our knowledge of the time. In his Gesta Ludovici IX he included a letter from Sempad the Constable to Henry I of Cyprus. Among his major sources for the reign of Louis IX was the lost Latin chronicle of Primat of Saint-Denis.

Both his chronicles, however, became very popular and found several continuators, Jean de Joinville being among those who made use of the Chronicon. This work from 1113 to 1300, with continuations to 1368, has been edited by H. Géraud for the Société de l'histoire de France (Paris, 1843), and practically all William's writings are found in the twentieth volume of Martin Bouquet's Recueil des historiens des Gaules et de la France (Paris, 1738–1876). A French translation of the Chronicon is in Guizot's Collection des mémoires relatifs à l'histoire de France (Paris, 1823–1835).

The World Chronicle of Guillaume de Nangis: A Manuscript’s Journey from Saint-Denis to St. Pancras is the life story of the manuscript codex copied in France, travelling to different cities and finally located at the British Library in London.
