= Dedication (publishing) =

Part of a book

Book dedication to a group of people

A dedication or book dedication is the expression of friendly connection or thanks by the author towards another person. The dedication has its own place on the dedication page and is part of the front matter.

== History ==
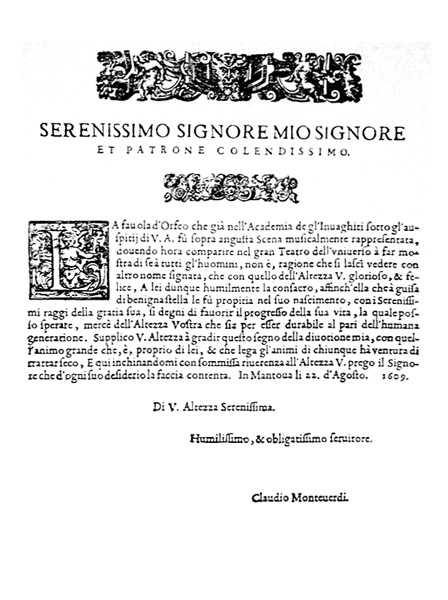
The dedication of Orfeo by Monteverdi, 1609

Evidence of dedications is provided back into Classical antiquity. Besides the wish to express their gratitude towards a certain person/persons, the authors often had other reasons to dedicate their work to a particular person. Well into the 18th century, it was not usual for publishers to remunerate the authors; authors tended to be paid or remunerated as one element of a patron-client relationship, in which the author-client paid tribute, in the dedication, to his or her patron. A typical writer dedicated "their book to a high standing personality – to Fürsts or bishops – or to a city and tried to gain some money through this practice".

In many cases the petitioner was lucky and received a gift from the patron. In some cases, the writer groveled before the patron and a formal dedication "contained often a very elaborate and submissive affection". In some cases, in addition to the authors, printers also sought monetary gifts, trying to cover a part of their costs.

== Themes ==
A book dedication can provide a fascinating glimpse into the life and times of the author. For example, Lord Byron (1788–1824) engaged in a famous feud with Robert Southey, who was then England's Poet Laureate. Byron wrote a mocking 17-verse dedication to his epic poem Don Juan in which he savagely pilloried Southey as a dull, reactionary "warbler" who had abandoned his political principles for favor and financial reward.

Book dedications can reflect the tastes and mores of society. Whereas many Elizabethan dedications were erudite and witty, some modern authors have abandoned literary pretense, sometimes using profanity to shock or amuse their audiences.

Book dedications have also been used to make political statements, such as the condemnation of war and inequality. Author Toni Morrison dedicated Beloved, her 1987 Pulitzer Prize-winning novel about a fugitive slave who killed her own daughter, to "Sixty Million and more."

== Today ==
In newer books, the dedication is located on a "dedication page" on its own, usually on the recto page after the main title page inside the front matter. It can occupy one or multiple lines depending on its importance. It can also be "in a longer version as a dedication letter or dedication preface at the book's beginning".

Today, book dedications tend to be short, often thanking partners, family, friends, or muses in the form of a personal note. A book may also be dedicated to the memory of a loved one, or to a cause.

== Handwritten dedication ==
The dedication is not to be confused with the handwritten dedication of a single copy: the presentation copy.

== See also ==
- Homage
- Front matter
- Prologue
- Paratext

== Notes ==
- Jost Hochuli: Buchgestaltung in der Schweiz. 2. Auflage. Pro Helvetia, Schweizer Kulturstiftung. Zürich 1998. ISBN 3-908102-10-3 (German)
- Reclams Sachlexikon des Buches. Hrsg. von U. Rautenberg. Reclam Verlag, Stuttgart 2003. ISBN 3-15-010542-0(German)
- Diana Stört: Form- und Funktionswandel der Widmung. Zur historischen Entwicklung und Typologisierung eines Paratextes. In: "Aus meiner Hand dies Buch." Zum Phänomen der Widmung. Hrsg. von Volker Kaukoreit, Marcel Atze und Michael Hansel. Wien: Turia + Kant 2007 (= Sichtungen. Archiv, Bibliothek, Literaturwissenschaft 8./9. Jg., 2005/2006), S. 79–112. ISBN 3-85132-476-5 (German)
- Emily Green: Dedicating Music, 1785–1850. University of Rochester Press, 2019. ISBN 9781580469494
