= Helinand of Froidmont =

Medieval poet and chronicler

Helinand of Froidmont (c. 1150—after 1229 (probably 1237)) was a medieval poet, chronicler, and ecclesiastical writer.

== Biography ==
He was born of Flemish parents at Pronleroy in France around 1150. He studied under Ralph of Beauvais.

His talents as a minstrel won the favor of King Philip Augustus, and for some time he freely indulged in the pleasures of the world, after which he became a Cistercian monk at the monastery of Froidmont in the diocese of Beauvais about the year 1190. From being a self-indulgent man of the world he became a model of piety and mortification in the monastery. Whatever time was not consumed in monastic exercises he devoted to ecclesiastical studies and, after his ordination to the priesthood, to preaching and writing. His date of death is said to be 3 February 1223, or 1229, or 1237. The Church of Beauvais honors him as a saint and celebrates his feast day on 3 February.

Helinand of Froidmont is sometimes confused with the Cistercian Helinand of Perseigne, the author of a commentary on the Apocalypse and glosses on the Book of Exodus, although there are no arguments for this identification.

== Works ==
=== Chronicon ===
Helinand is most remembered for his Chronicon, a world-chronicle in Latin containing forty-nine books (of which only less than half have survived), which he compiled from 1211 to 1223. Helinand incorporated several of his treatises and letters into his Chronicon. These include moral treatises such as De cognitione sui, and De bono regimine principis, twenty-eight sermons on various Church festivals; one epistle entitled De reparatione lapsi, in which he exhorts a renegade monk to return to his monastery. The Chronicon itself is largely a compilation of texts taken from a wide range of sources.

Vincent of Beauvais on his turn based his Speculum Historiale, which provided a history of the world down to his time, on the Chronicon of Helinand.

Surviving parts of the Chronicon include Books 1-18, covering the period from the creation to the death of Alexander the Great; fragments from Books 19-44, surviving as copies in the Speculum Maius of Vincent of Beauvais; the text of books 45-49, which deal with the period from 634 to 1204. Books 45-49 of the Chronicon serve as a source for the chronicle by the Cistercian monk Aubri de Trois-Fontaines (Alberic of Trois-Fontaines) (c. 1241).

According to the Catholic Encyclopedia, "his chronicle is not sufficiently critical to be of much historical value." Yet it would be unfair to call Helinand an uncritical writer - or rather, compiler - of history, as from time to time he interrupts the narrative to alert the reader where his sources diverge from each other, often trying to harmonize them in much the same fashion as a scholastic treatise. The structure of the Chronicon is mainly chronological, although Helinand frequently digresses from the historical account to comment on Scripture, include a treatise against astrology, write about saints and their legends, examine the animal world, or incorporate material from Latin literature or vernacular traditions. He is frequently quoted as a medieval authority on the meaning of the word "graal," i.e. the Holy Grail. In this sense, the Chronicon's value is not based on its existence as a work on history. He is cited, for example, as a source of the description of the flight of Eilmer of Malmesbury.

=== Lesser works ===
Helinand wrote a work in Old French called Les Vers de la Mort ("Verses of Death") shortly after entering the monastery, between 1194 and 1197. In fifty stanzas, Helinand asks Death to call upon his best friends and exhort them to abandon the world. Each stanza contains twelve octosyllabic lines; the rhyme scheme is AAB AAB BBA BBA. This form was imitated by later poets and is called by critics the "helinandian stanza." In this poem, Death appears as a ubiquitous and hyperactive agent. Helinand does not use macabre elements, except in the title, which puns on the homonymy between "vers" (worms) and "vers" (verses). His lyrical sermon uses various tropes such as anaphora, metaphor, and adnomination to great effect. Throughout this unique testimony of his poetic talent as a trouvère, Helinand appears as a precursor of Villon, Chastelain, and other French poets of the 15th century.

As a well-known preacher, he wrote more than sixty Latin sermons. His sermons, written in a neat Latin style, give evidence of a remarkable acquaintance with the pagan poets as well as with the Fathers of the Church.

A Martyrium of Saints Gereon, Victor, Cassius, and Florentius, martyrs of the Theban Legion used to be attributed to Helinand, but it is unclear whether he is the true author.

== Bibliography ==
- Helinand de Froidmont, Les vers de la mort. Edition and translation (in modern French) Michel Boyer and Monique Santucci. Paris: Champion, 1983.
- Beverly Mayne Kienzle, Cistercians, Heresy and Crusade in Occitania, 1145-1229: Preaching in the Lord's Vineyard. Woodbridge and Rochester, N.Y.: York Medieval Press, Boydell and Brewer, 2001. ISBN 1-903153-00-X review
- Saak, E. L., "The Limits of Knowledge: Hélinand de Froidmont's Chronicon." In Pre-modern encyclopaedic texts : proceedings of the second COMERS Congress, Groningen, 1–4 July 1996, edited by Peter Binkley, 289-302. Leiden: Brill, 1997.
