= Jean de Vignay =

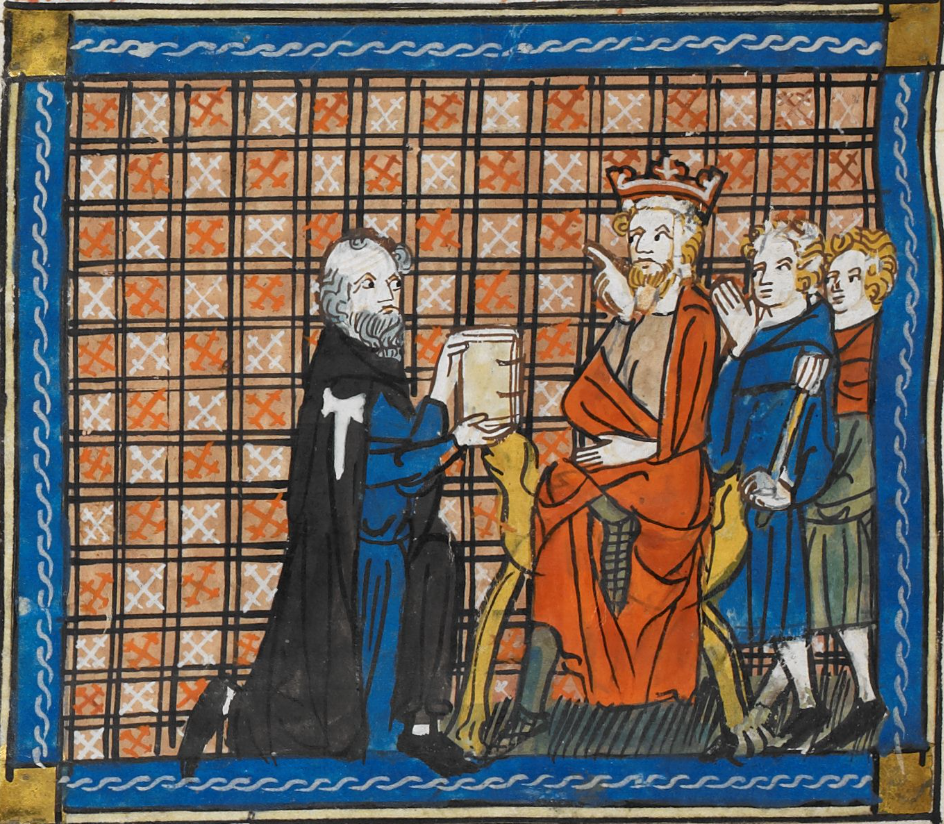
Jean depicted as a hospitaller of Saint James giving his translation Le Directoire to King Philip VI, from BL, Royal MS 19 D I.

Jean de Vignay (c. 1282/1285 – c. 1350) was a French monk and translator. He translated from Latin into Old French for the French court, and his works survive in many illuminated manuscripts. They include two military manuals, a book on chess, parts of the New Testament, a travelogue and a chronicle.

== Life ==
Some details of Jean's life can be gleaned from the additions he made to the chronicle of Primat of Saint-Denis for his translation. He was born in the Duchy of Normandy, probably near Bayeux. (Note: There is no known place in France called Vignay. The closest is Vignats, Latin Vinacum or Vinacium.) He had relatives in this area and was educated in the school at Molay Bacon, where his cousin was a classmate. In August 1298, when his cousin was thirteen years old, he was a witness to a miracle of Saint Louis in the chapel of Saint Michael at Bayeux. (Note: Saint Louis had only been canonized in 1297, but he already had an altar in Saint Michael's.) If Jean was born between about 1282 and 1285, as seems likely from the date of schooling, his father must have been quite old at his birth, since Jean records that his father witnessed a miracle at the time Saint Louis returned from the Seventh Crusade in 1254. Jean records another miracle that took place in the chapel of Saint Michael in 1302—a drowned child was revived on the altar of Saint Louis—although he does not say if he witnessed it himself.

Jean is described in many manuscripts as a hospitaller of the Order of Saint James of Altopascio, serving at the hospital of Saint-Jacques in Paris. He is depicted in many miniatures as a monk and wearing the insignia of his order, a tau cross. A reference he makes to the Place Maubert confirms that he was familiar with Paris.

The date of his death is unknown. His last precisely datable work was executed in 1333, but he certainly produced translations after that. His death has been placed in 1348, but without any basis. Lenora Wolfgang places it around 1350. In the two centuries following his death, he was a famous figure whose works were widely reproduced both as manuscripts and printed editions. In the middle of the sixteenth century, however, he and his work fell into obscurity.

== Works ==
Jean depicted as a monk translating Vincent of Beauvais for Queen Joan, from BnF MS fr. 308.

Jean made at least twelve translations from Latin into Old French, eleven of which survive. They are all preserved in sumptuously illuminated manuscripts made for King Philip VI (1328–1350), Queen Joan (died 1348) and their son, John, Duke of Normandy, who became king in 1350. Jean's knowledge of Latin was only basic and his mostly very literal translations do not make for easy reading.

Christine Knowles distinguishes sharply between the last four surviving translations and the rest. These—Jeu des échecs, Miroir de l'Église, Enseignements and Chronique—are different in style. For the last two, the original Latin works are lost and we have only the French translation of Jean. For the first two, a comparison with the Latin versions shows that he has omitted parts, added to others and reworded in a way wholly unfamiliar to his other translations. Knowles assigns all four of these works to a later period than the rest. Jean's eleven surviving translations are:

1. De la chose de la chevalerie ("On the Matter of Chivalry"), a translation of De re militari of Vegetius, survives in eight manuscripts, four from the fourteenth century and four from the fifteenth. This is probably one of his earliest works. He used the earlier translation of Jean de Meung as an aid.
2. Le Miroir historial ("Mirror of History"), a translation of the Speculum historiale of Vincent of Beauvais, was translated for Queen Joan probably in 1333. It was printed at Paris by Antoine Vérard (1495–96) and then again by Nicolas Couteau (1531).
3. Les Épitres et évangiles ("Epistles and Gospels"), a translation of the canonical Epistles and Gospels from the Vulgate, was translated for Queen Joan in 1326. It survives in six manuscripts.
4. La Légende dorée ("Golden Legend"), a translation of the Legenda aurea of James of Varagine, was translated for Queen Joan probably beginning in 1333 or 1334. It was routinely emended and augmented in copying so that the first printed edition is only partially a text composed by Jean. This translation was itself translated into English and printed by William Caxton.
5. Le Directoire pour faire le passage de la Terre Sainte ("Directory for Making the Passage of the Holy Land"), a translation of the anonymous Directorium ad faciendum passagium transmarinum, was translated for Philip VI in 1333, only a year after the original Latin text appeared.
6. Les merveilles de la Terre d'Outremer ("Wonders of the Land Overseas"), a translation of the Descriptio orientalium partium of Odoric of Pordenone, which was written in 1330. Jean's translation includes a notice of Odoric's death that had been added to the original work in 1331.
7. Les Oisivetz des emperieres ("Leisure of Emperors"), a translation of the Otia imperialia of Gervase of Tilbury, survives in a single manuscript. There is an earlier translation by John of Antioch.
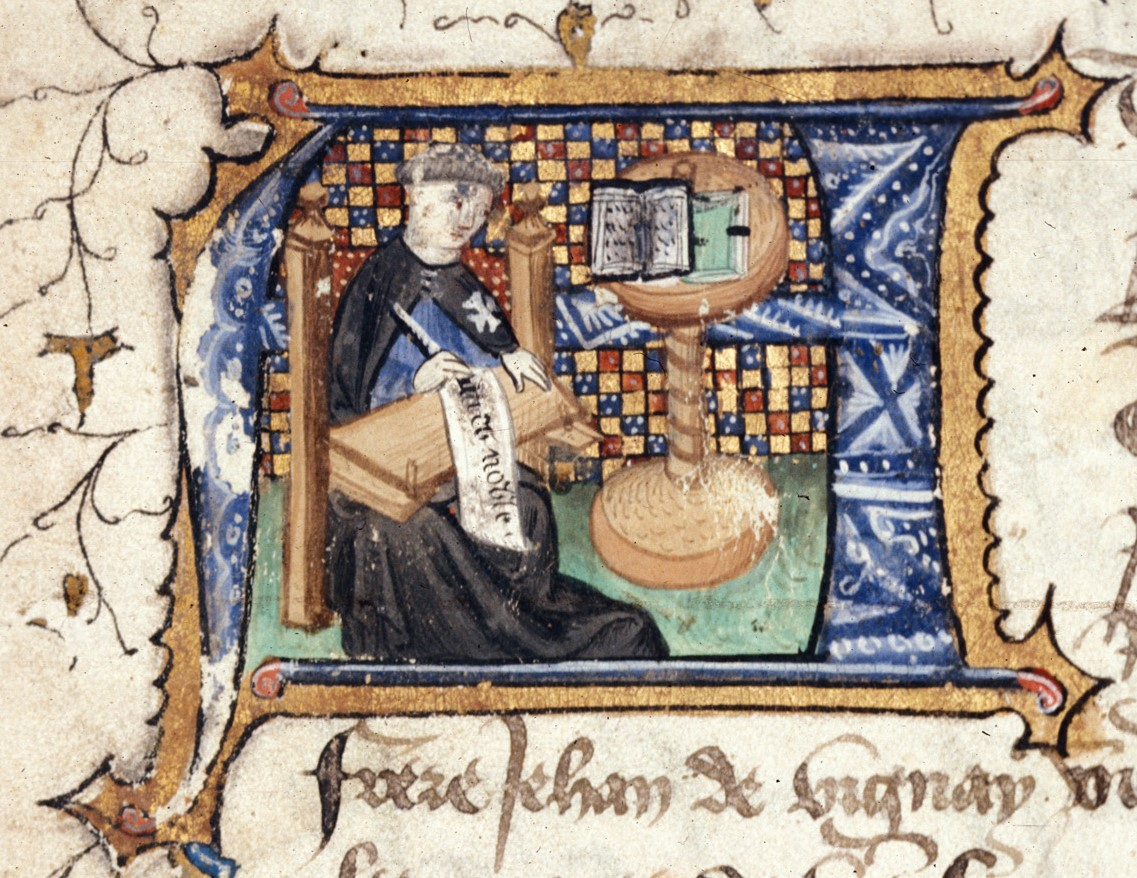
  Jean, erroneously depicted as a Knight Hospitaller, working on his Livre des eschez
8. Le Jeu des échecs moralisés ("Moralized Game of Chess"), a translation of the Liber super ludo scaccorum of James of Cessole, was translated for the Duke of Normandy, which means it must have been completed before he succeeded to the throne in 1350. It was Jean's most popular translation after the Légende dorée. This translation was itself translated into English and published by William Caxton in 1475. It was only the second book to be printed in English.
9. Le Miroir de l'Église ("Mirror of the Church"), a translation of the Speculum ecclesiae of Hugh of Saint-Cher, was translated for Philip VI along with the Enseignements. It survives in two manuscripts (but in neither does it appear with its companion piece).
10. Les Enseignements ou ordenances pour un seigneur qui a guerres et grans gouvernement à faire ("Teachings or Ordinances for a Lord Who Has to Make War and Good Government"), a translation of a now lost treatise by Marquis Theodore I of Montferrat, was translated for Philip VI along with the Miroir de l'Église. It survives in two manuscripts (separate from its companion piece). It was originally written in Greek, but Theodore himself made a Latin translation. Only the French version of Jean de Vignay survives, both of Theodore's versions having been lost.
11. La Chronique ("Chronicle"), a translation of a now lost chronicle of Primat of Saint-Denis, was translated for Queen Joan probably after 1335. It survives in a single manuscript. Jean made a few small additions to this work.

There is one lost translation that can be confidently ascribed to Jean. A catalogue of the library of Charles VI made in 1423 lists a prose version of the Alexander Romance translated by Jean de Vignay in 1341. There are also works that have been falsely attributed to Jean. The Margarita Philosophiarum was written in 1298 by a certain Jean de Vignay of Dijon, who was a different person. The Livre royal, now lost, was a verse encyclopedia written between 1343 and 1348, possibly by the poet Watrigues. It was assigned by mistake to Jean de Vignay in the 19th century. Finally, Les Bonnes meurs, a French translation of De bonis moribus by the Augustinian Jacques le Grant, is mistakenly attributed to Jean de Vignay in the prologue of an English translation made in the mid-15th century by John Shirley.

== Bibliography ==
- Knowles, Christine M. (1953). The Life and Work of Jean de Vignay (PhD dissertation). Birkbeck College, University of London.
- Knowles, Christine M. (1954). "Jean de Vignay, un traducteur du XIVe siècle". Romania. 75 (299): 353–383. doi:10.3406/roma.1954.3419.
- Pignatelli, Cinzia; Gerner, Dominique, eds. (2006). Les traductions françaises des Otia imperialia de Gervais de Tilbury par Jean d'Antioche et Jean de Vignay. Librairie Droz.
- Snavely, Guy E. (1911). "Jehan De Vignay and His Influence on Early English Literature". Romanic Review. 2: 323–330. doi:10.7916/D81N80V4.
- Wolfgang, Lenora D. (1995). "Vignay, Jean de". In William W. Kibler; Grover A. Zinn; Lawrence Earp; John Bell Henneman Jr. (eds.). Medieval France An Encyclopedia. Garland. p. 955.
