= Gesta Dagoberti =

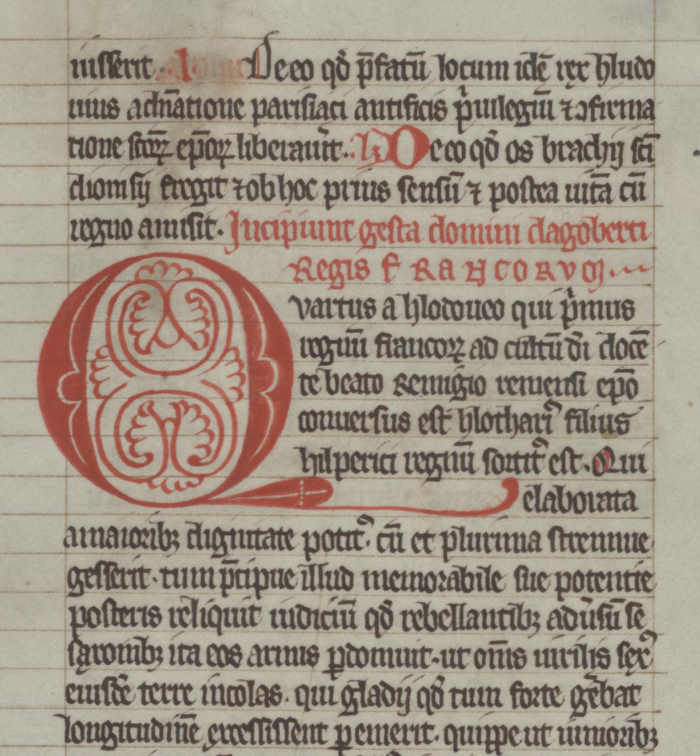
The opening of the Gesta in the Jena manuscript. The rubric (in red) reads "The deeds of the lord Dagobert, king of the Franks begin..." (Incipiuntur gesta domni dagoberti regis francorum...). The decorated initial Q is the start of the text itself: "Fourth in line from Clovis, the first king of the Franks to convert to the worship of God" (Quartus ab Hlodoveo, qui primus regnum Francorum ad cultum Dei).

The Gesta Dagoberti ('Deeds of Dagobert'), fully Gesta domni Dagoberti regis Francorum ('Deeds of Lord Dagobert, King of the Franks'), is an anonymous Latin biography of Dagobert I, king of the Franks (623–639). It combines deeds from the life of Dagobert with numerous accounts of miracles to present Dagobert as a saint and the founder of the Abbey of Saint-Denis. It was written in the early 9th century. As a historical source, it is "extremely unreliable", but not totally useless.

== Date, authorship and manuscripts ==
The Gesta was written between 800 and 835 at Saint-Denis under the direction of Abbot Hilduin. The dating may be narrowed down to between 830 and 835, or even 834–835. That it was in existence by 835 is certain, since the Emperor Louis the Pious refers to it in a letter that year to Hilduin, who had probably given him a copy. Although anonymous, it has been tentatively assigned to Hincmar, then a monk at Saint-Denis, on the basis of similarities in language between the Gesta and two of Hincmar's known works, the Miracula sancti Dionysii and the Vitae Remigii. Laurent Morelle suggests that Hincmar was part of a team who composed the Gesta under Hilduin's direction.

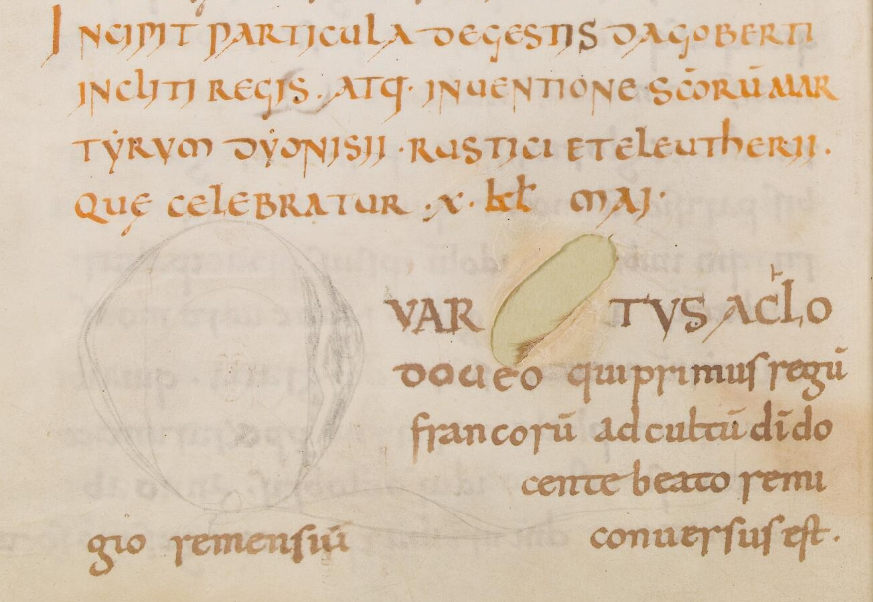
Start of the Gesta in the earliest surviving manuscript. The initial Q is missing.

The oldest extant manuscript of the Gesta dates to the 9th century and once belonged to the Abbey of Saint-Bertin. Today it is Saint-Omer, Bibliothèque municipale, MS 342. Other known copies include:

- Paris, Bibliothèque nationale, MS lat. 5569 (10th century)
- London, British Library, MS Add. 21109 (12th century)
- Saint-Omer, Bibliothèque municipale, MS 715 (12th century)
- Vatican City, Biblioteca Apostolica Vaticana, MS Reg. lat. 571 IV (12th century)
- Saint-Omer, Bibliothèque municipale, MS 716 (13th century)
- Brussels, Royal Library of Belgium, MS 7460 (13th century)
- Paris, Bibliothèque nationale, MS lat. 11756 (13th century)
- Paris, Bibliothèque nationale, MS lat. 5925 (13th century)
- Jena, Thüringer Universitäts- und Landesbibliothek, El. 2° 65 (14th century)
- Dresden, Sächsische Landesbibliothek, Staats- und Universitätsbibliothek, MS F 60 (14th century)

== Sources and contents ==
The Gesta is the earliest surviving work devoted exclusively to Dagobert I. Written in Latin, it combines deeds from the life of Dagobert with numerous accounts of miracles to present Dagobert as a saint and the founder of Saint-Denis. Its sources include the Chronicle of Fredegar, Gregory of Tours's Historia Francorum, the Liber historiae Francorum and various saint's lives and passion narratives, including a Life of Arnulf of Metz. The author also had access to the archives of Saint-Denis, which included some charters issued by Dagobert.

Dagobert I belonged to the Merovingian dynasty. The first line of the Gesta refers to his father, Chlothar II, as the fourth in the line of Christian kings. The author of the Gesta sought, however, to link Dagobert also to the Carolingian dynasty reigning in the 830s. He gave his mother the name Bertrada, which was also the name of Charlemagne's mother, and claimed he had been educated by Arnulf of Metz, one of the earliest ancestors of the Carolingians. Nevertheless, there is reason to believe that the author was subtly criticizing the Carolingians. The Gesta is written rather as a speculum regum, "mirror for kings", a clear presentation of how a virtuous and godly king ought to act, implying perhaps that contemporary kings needed some correction. Hincmar is known later to have heavily criticized Charles Martel, one of the most illustrious Carolingians.

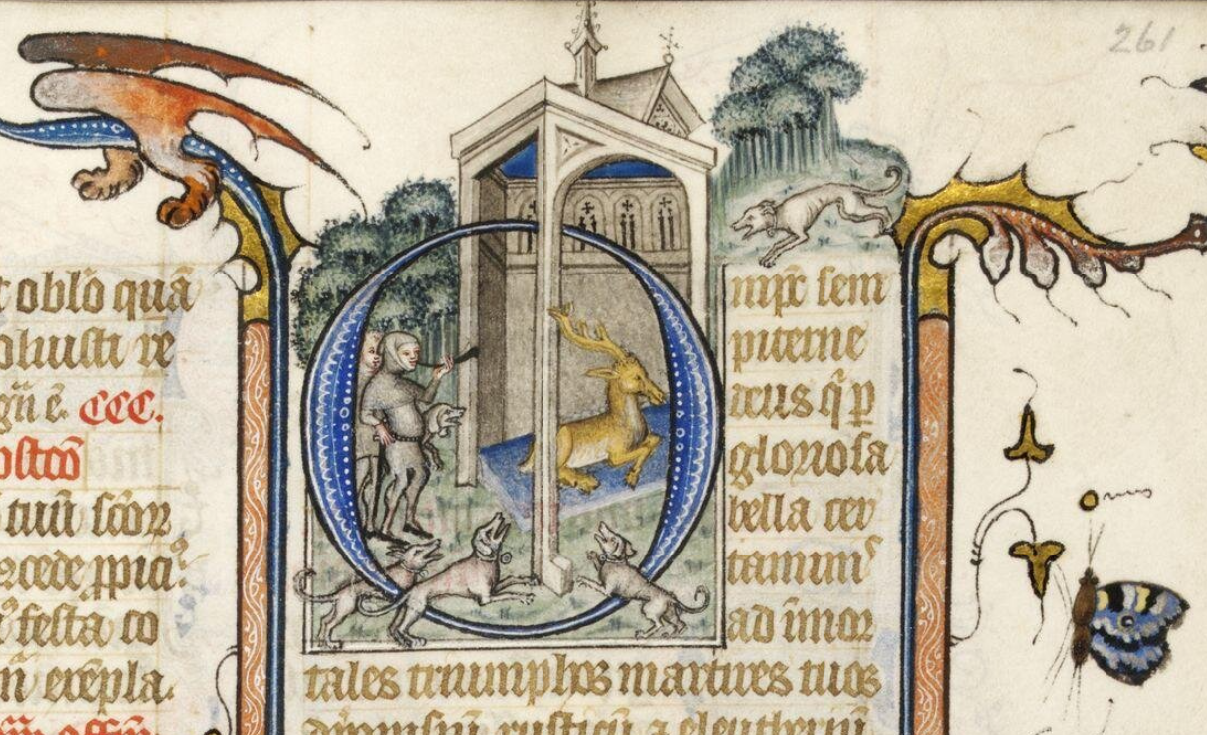
The miracle of the stag, from a missal made for Saint-Denis around 1350. The story originates in the Gesta.

The Gesta attributes several miracles to Saint Denis to explain Dagobert's devotion to the saint and his shrine. One day, while Dagobert was still just a prince, he was chasing a stag when the animal ran into a shrine of the saint. When the hunters and dogs attempted to pursue it, they were rendered unable to move. Dagobert realized Denis's protective power. Later, after he angered his father by insulting Duke Sadragesilus of Aquitaine, he fled to a shrine contain relics of Denis and his companions. There he saw Denis in a dream and promised to build a new shrine for his tomb.

The author of the Gesta specifies many gifts Dagobert made to Saint-Denis, some with such specificity that he presumably had actual charters from the archives in front of him. These include a tribute of one hundred cows annually from Le Mans. Dagobert also remembered Saint-Denis in his will, of which four copies were made for Laon, Metz, the royal treasury and Saint-Denis. On his deathbed, he had his son, Clovis II, sign a document promising to respect Dagobert's gifts to Saint-Denis. He was buried beside the altar in the abbey church.

The Gesta is well known for its account of Dagobert's demise. At the time of Dagobert's death, Bishop Ansoald of Poitiers was travelling on a diplomatic mission when he stopped in Sicily to meet a famous hermit named John. The hermit informed him that, on the very day of Dagobert's death and while he was praying for the king's soul, he had a vision of the king being escorted by black-coloured demons in a boat towards one of the active volcanoes in the Aeolian Islands. The king, however, called out to the saints to whom he had been generous all his life—Denis, Martin and Maurice—who appeared out of thunder and lightning to rescue Dagobert, taking him with them to the Bosom of Abraham. The story of Dagobert's postmortem rescue probably owes something to the account in Gregory the Great's Dialogues of a hermit on Lipari who saw Theoderic the Great thrown into a volcano that led to Hell.

== Usage ==
The Gesta was one of the sources used by Primat of Saint-Denis for his Old French Roman des rois (1274), the earliest redaction of the Grandes Chroniques de France. It was also an important source for the Vita et passio sancti Dyonisii, an account of Denis's life, death and miracles written by the monk Yves in the early 14th century.

For modern historians, the Gesta is "extremely unreliable" as a historical source, but not entirely useless. It is the earliest source to claim that Clovis I was anointed with holy oil by Bishop Remigius. It is also the first source to name Dagobet's mother. Chlothar II is known to have had two wives, Haldetrudis and later Bertetrudis. The Gesta is sometimes taken to indicate that the latter was Dagobert's mother. Among its stories that are possibly true are the accounts of the punitive expedition against Duke Berthoald of Saxony and Dagobert's divorcing Gomatrude on grounds of infertility.

The Gesta occasionally differs from its main source, Fredegar. For example, it reports that there were no survivors of Dagobert's massacre of the Bulgars, whereas Fredegar has the leader, Alciocus, and 700 survivors taking refuge in the Windic March. It also offers a slightly different account of the revolt of Samo. It makes Samo to be a Slav and its version was a source for the Conversio Bagoariorum et Carantanorum.

== Editions ==
- Krusch, Bruno [in German], ed. (1888). "Gesta Dagoberti I regis Francorum". Monumenta Germaniae Historica. Vol. Scriptores rerum Merovingicarum 2. Hanover. pp. 399–425.

== Bibliography ==
- Bernstein, Alan E. (2017). Hell and Its Rivals: Death and Retribution among Christians, Jews, and Muslims in the Early Middle Ages. Cornell University Press.
- Bouchard, Constance B. (2015). Rewriting Saints and Ancestors: Memory and Forgetting in France, 500–1200. University of Pennsylvania Press.
- Diesenberger, Max (2003). "Hair, Sacrality and Symbolic Capital in the Frankish Kingdoms". In Richard Corradini; Max Diesenberger; Helmut Reimitz (eds.). The Construction of Communities in the Early Middle Ages: Texts, Resources and Artefacts. Brill.
- Goethe, Renee Lynn (2016). King Dagobert, the Saint, and Royal Salvation: The Shrine of Saint-Denis and Propaganda Production (850–1319 C.E.) (PhD diss.). University of Iowa. doi:10.17077/etd.b8b488ok.
- Goldberg, Eric J. (2013). "Louis the Pious and the Hunt". Speculum. 88 (3): 613–643. doi:10.1017/s0038713413001711. S2CID 162936093.
- Kardaras, Georgios (2019). Byzantium and the Avars, 6th–9th Century AD: Political, Diplomatic and Cultural Relations. Brill.
- Krusch, Bruno (1920). "Appendix, Tomus II, Gesta Dagobert I". Monumenta Germaniae Historica, Scriptores rerum Merovingicarum. Vol. 7. pp. 778–782.
- Lapidge, Michael (2017). Hilduin of Saint-Denis: The Passio S. Dionysii in Prose and Verse. Brill.
- Levillain, Léon (1921). "Études sur l'abbaye de Saint-Denis à l'époque mérovingienne, 1. Les sources narratives". Bibliothèque de l'École des chartes. 82: 5–116. doi:10.3406/bec.1921.448649.
- Luchaire, Achille (1899). Études sur quelques manuscrits de Rome et de Paris. Bibliothèque de la Faculté des lettres de Paris, VIII. Paris.
- McLaughlin, Megan (1994). Consorting with Saints: Prayer for the Dead in Early Medieval France. Cornell University Press.
- Pohl, Walter (2018) [2015]. The Avars: A Steppe Empire in Central Europe, 567–822. Cornell University Press.
- Pyun, Kyunghee (2008). "Foundation Legends in the Illuminated Missal of Saint-Denis: Interplay of Liturgy, Hagiography, and Chronicle". Viator. 39 (2): 143–191. doi:10.1484/J.VIATOR.1.100209.
- Rech, Régis (2016). "Gesta Dagoberti I regis Francorum". In G. Dunphy; C. Bratu (eds.). Encyclopedia of the Medieval Chronicle. Brill Online. doi:10.1163/2213-2139_emc_SIM_01116.
- Runciman, Steven (1930). A History of the First Bulgarian Empire. George Bell & Sons.
- Spiegel, Gabrielle M. (1974). Studies in the Chronicle Tradition of Saint-Denis (PhD diss.). The Johns Hopkins University. ProQuest 7429017
- Stegeman, Hans (2014). The Growth of an Austrasian Identity: Processes of Identification and Legend Construction in the Northeast of the Regnum Francorum, 600–800 (PDF) (PhD diss.). University of Groningen.
- Wood, Ian N. (1994). The Merovingian Kingdoms, 450–751. Longman.
