= Hugh of Fleury =

French author and historian

Hugh of Fleury (Hugo Floriacensis, Hugo a Santa Maria) (d. not before 1118) was a French Benedictine monk and ecclesiastical writer. He is known only by his works.

- In 1109 he compiled an ecclesiastical history in four volumes, up to the death of Charles the Great (814). In the following year he made another edition of the work in six volumes, arranging the contents in a better manner, adding notes, especially of a theological nature, and omitting a few things, bringing it up to 855. It appeared in print for the first time at Münster, in 1638, edited by Bernhard Rottendorf. This contains also a letter to Ivo of Chartres and a preface to King Louis the Fat. Selections can be found in Migne, Patrologia Latina, CLXIII. This work relied on an abbreviated chronicle of the kings of France (Historia Francorum Senonensis, 688–1034).
- A chronicle of the kings of France (Historia regum francorum monasterii Sancti Dionysii) from Pharamond, the legendary first king, to the death of Philip I of France in 1108 (MGH SS 9, 395-406).
- A book narrating the "modern acts of the Frankish kings" (Modernorum regum francorum actus), covering time from 842 to 1108 (MGH SS 9, 376-395). A shorter French version is in the Guizot collection, VII, 65-86. This and the next work were formerly ascribed to Ivo of Chartres.
- De regia potestate et sacerdotali dignitate addressed to King Henry I of England, during the controversy on investiture, opposing Hugh of Flavigny who upheld the ideas maintained by Pope Gregory VII. With great freedom Hugh of Fleury tries to settle the dispute and advances views later embodied in the concordats [see Sackur in "Neues Archiv" (1891), 369; Mansi, II, 184-197].
- Remodelling of the life of Saint Sacerdos, Bishop of Limoges, previously written by someone else,
- Continuation of a work De miraculis S. Benedicti Floriaci patratis

He is frequently misidentified as a different Hugh of Fleury, who became Abbot of Canterbury and died in 1124.
