= Sackur =

Sackur is a surname. Notable people with the surname include:

- Otto Sackur (1880-1914), German chemist
- Stephen Sackur (born 1964), English journalist
