= Helinand of Perseigne =

Cistercian monk and writer

Helinand of Perseigne was a Cistercian monk and writer. He served as the procurator of Perseigne Abbey during the abbacy of Adam (r. 1188–1221). He wrote a commentary on the Book of Revelation, mentioned by John of Wales around 1280, but it is now lost. Some preserved glosses on the Book of Exodus are also attributed to him.

Réjane Molina has proposed that Helinand of Froidmont may have spent time at Perseigne before moving to Froidmont, suggesting that the two authors were, in fact, the same person.
