= Stenay =

- Commune
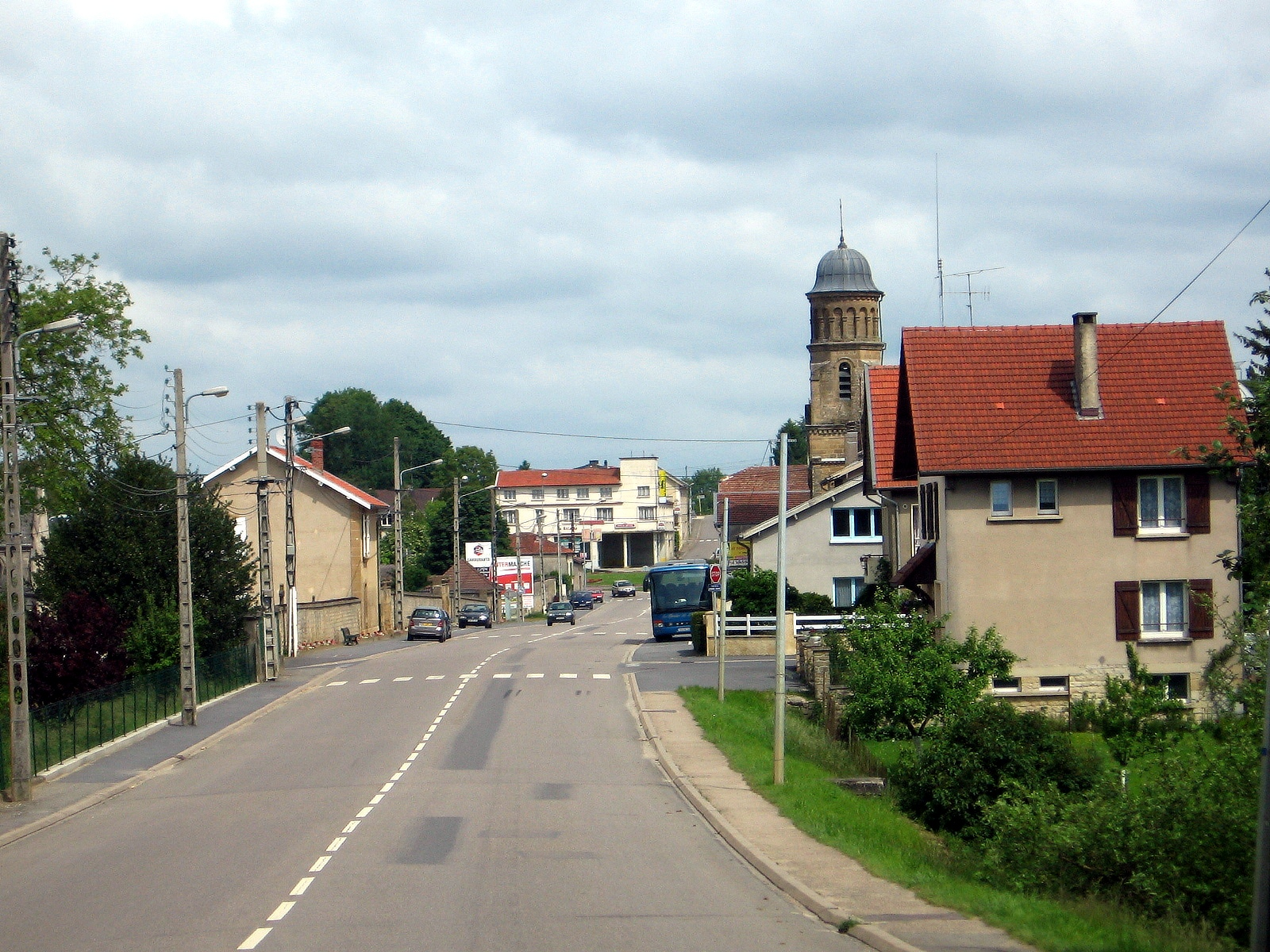
- A general view of Stenay

- Coat of arms
- Location of Stenay
- Location within France Location within Grand Est
- Coordinates: 49°29′27″N 5°11′11″E
- Country: France
- Region: Grand Est
- Department: Meuse
- Arrondissement: Verdun
- Canton: Stenay

Government
  - Mayor (2020–2026): Stéphane Perrin
- Area^{1}: 27.16 km^{2} (10.49 sq mi)
- Highest elevation: 303 m (994 ft)
- Lowest elevation: 163 m (535 ft)
- Population (2023): 2,403
  - Density: 88.48/km^{2} (229.2/sq mi)
- Time zone: UTC+01:00 (CET)
  - Summer (DST): UTC+02:00 (CEST)
- INSEE/Postal code: 55502 /55700
- ^{1} French Land Register data, which excludes lakes, ponds, glaciers > 1 km^{2} (0.386 sq mi or 247 acres) and river estuaries.

Stenay (French pronunciation: [stənɛ]) is a commune in north-eastern France. It lies in the Meuse department, which is located in the Lorraine portion of the Grand Est region.

== History ==
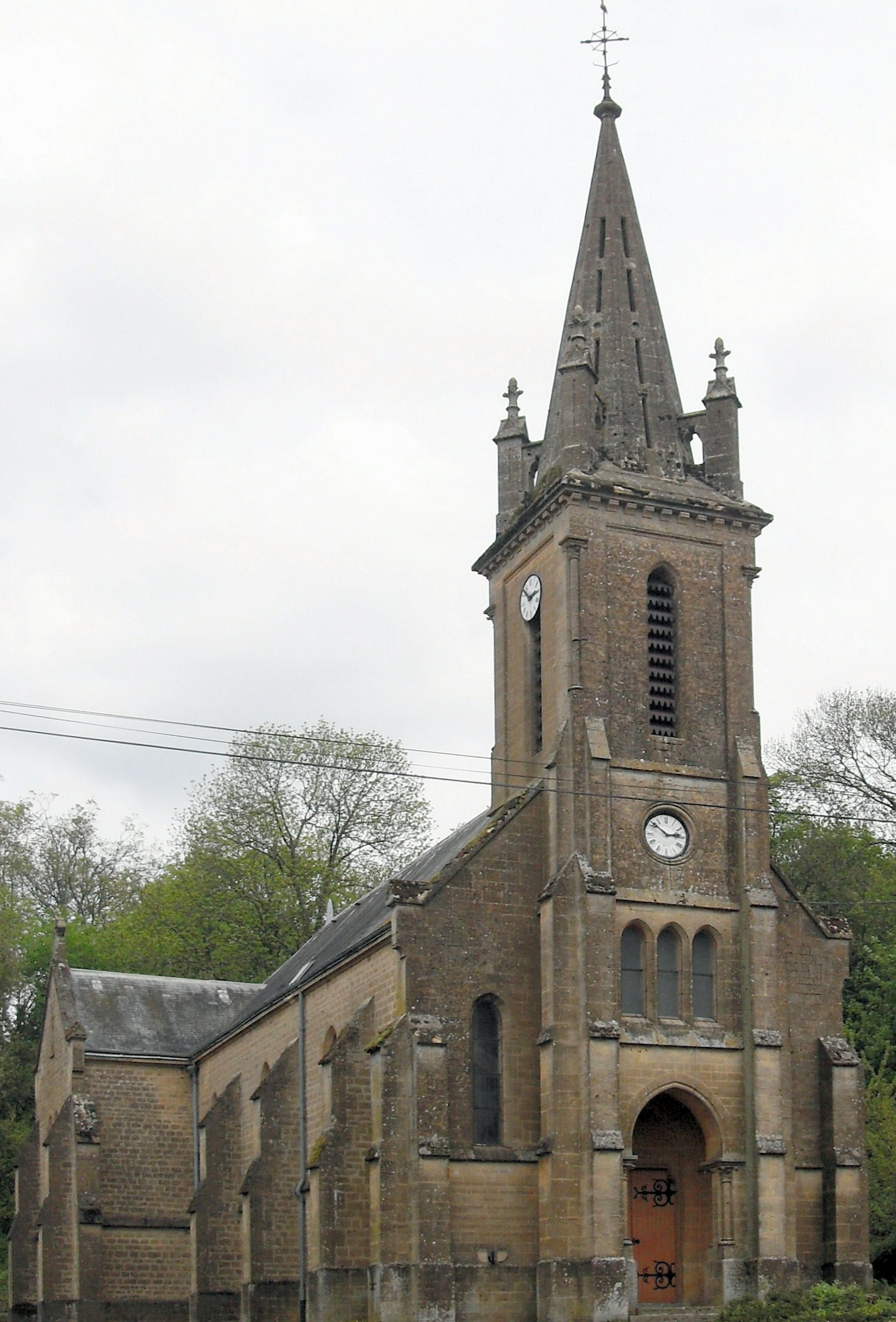
Église Saint-Joseph de Cervisy

Map of Stenay (c. 1650)

In 679, the assassinated king Dagobert II was buried in the church of Saint-Remi in Stenay. In 872, King Charles the Bald had his body moved a newly built basilica dedicated to him. In 1069, the canons of the basilica were accused of laxness. Duke Godfrey the Bearded handed the basilica over to Gorze Abbey and it became a Benedictine priory. The Vita Dagoberti was written there. In 1580, the basilica was secularized and the cloisters demolished. In 1591, what remained was sacked by Huguenots.

Stenay was one of the last villages to experience fighting during the First World War. The village was captured on 11 November 1918 by the U.S. 89th Division, commanded by Major General William M. Wright, only hours before the Armistice with Germany went into effect. The 89th Division lost 365 men, mainly to enemy howitzer fire.

== Toponymy ==
According to local tradition in antiquity, the village is named after a local temple of Saturn. The name has changed significantly over time, starting with Sathanagium and Astenidum, and, through natural language change, resulting in Stenay.

The progression of names is as follows:

- Sathanagium, Sathonagium (714)
- Astenidum (877)
- Astanid (888)
- Satenaium (900s)
- Sathaniacum (900s)
- Sathinidium (1036)
- Sathanacum (1069)
- Setunia (1000s)
- Sathanacum villam (1079)
- Satiniacum, Sathiniacum (1086)
- Sathanaco (1108)
- Sathanacensi (1157)
- Sathaniaco (1159)
- Sathanai (1173)
- Sethenac (1208)
- Settenai (1243)
- Sethenai (1264)
- Sathenay (1276, 1399, 1463, 1483, 1549, 1558, 1585)
- Sathanay (1284)
- Satenay (1399)
- Astenæum (1580)
- Satanagus (1630)
- Satanay, Sthenay (1643)
- Stenay (1793)

== Population ==
Its inhabitants are called Stenaisiens.

Historical population
Year	Pop.	±% p.a.
1968	4,125	—
1975	3,767	−1.29%
1982	3,693	−0.28%
1990	3,202	−1.77%
1999	2,952	−0.90%
2007	2,797	−0.67%
2012	2,749	−0.35%
2017	2,597	−1.13%
2023	2,403	−1.29%
Source: INSEE

== Tourism ==
The European Beer Museum (Musée Européen de la bière), founded in 1986, is considered the largest of its kind on the continent.

== See also ==
- Communes of the Meuse department
