= Presentation copy =

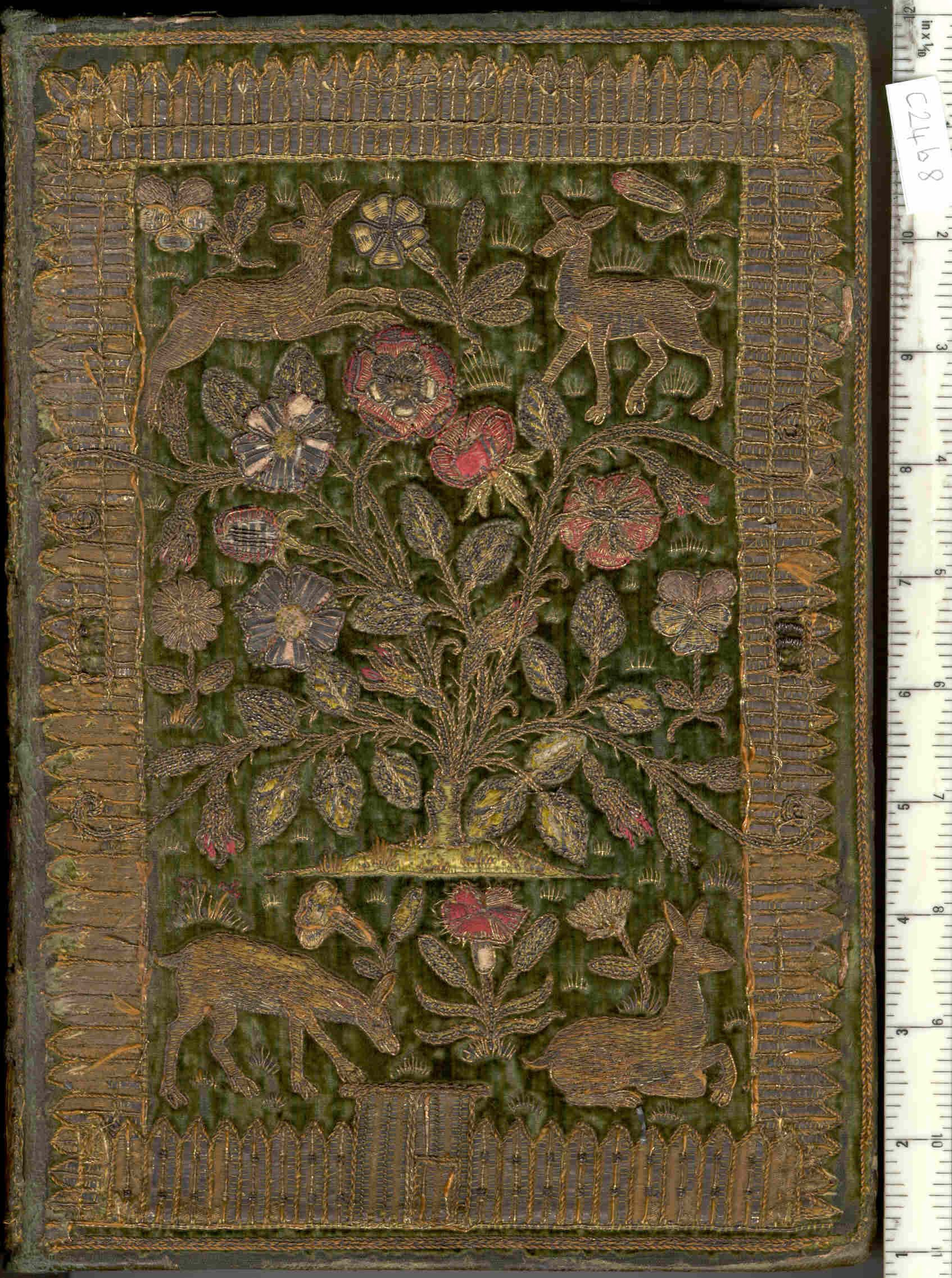
Deluxe presentation copy of Matthew Parker's De antiquitate Britannicæ ecclesiæ for Queen Elizabeth I

A presentation copy is a copy of a book that has been presented, usually by the author or someone associated with the book's production, to another individual. The copy usually contains a presentation inscription identifying it as a presentation copy, such as an author's signature. A simple Latin inscription is ex dono authoris ("from the author's gift"). In manuscripts from the Middle Ages and the Renaissance, a presentation copy often contained a presentation miniature, a small painting depicting the author giving a copy to a recipient.

There are three types of presentation copy. The first and most common is that given by the author or someone associated with the book's production, such as the printer or illustrator. The second includes special presentation copies prepared for prominent individuals, such as kings. A small number of presentation copies are associated neither with the book's producers nor famous individuals and are notable only for the usually fine details of binding or printing. Unqualified, the term "presentation copy" always suggests a copy gifted by the author.

A dedication copy is a copy presented to the dedicatee. They rank highly among presentation copies in collectors' estimations. An inscribed copy is not a presentation copy, but is signed by the author at the book owner's request. Presentation copies are generally more valuable and rarer than inscribed copies. Even presentation copies vary in value depending on their closeness to the author. The most valuable are those that have the author's dated autograph from the time of publication.

== Examples of presentation copies ==
- Plays, Never Before Printed (1668), signed by Margaret Cavendish at the Folger Shakespeare Library
- An Account of the Abipones (1784), presentation copy from John Carter Brown to John R. Bartlett at the John Hay Library, Brown University
- A Study in Scarlet (1887), signed "With the Author's Compliments" by Arthur Conan Doyle at the Beinecke Library, Yale University
- The Nursery "Alice" (1889), dedicated by Lewis Carroll, sold by Sotheby's in 2012 for £36,050
