= Gabrielle M. Spiegel =

American historian

Gabrielle Michele Spiegel (born January 20, 1943) is an American historian of medieval France, and the former Krieger-Eisenhower Professor of History at Johns Hopkins University, where she served as chair of the history department for six years, as well as acting and interim dean of faculty. She also served as dean of humanities at the University of California, Los Angeles in 2004–2005. From 2008 to 2009, she was the president of the American Historical Association. In 2011, she was elected a fellow of the American Academy of Arts and Sciences.

== Education ==
Spiegel received a Bachelor of Arts from Bryn Mawr College in 1964. The next year, she completed a Master of Arts in teaching at Harvard University. She received her PhD in 1974 from Johns Hopkins University.

== Career ==
Spiegel began lecturing at her alma mater, Bryn Mawr, from 1972 to 1973. In 1974, she taught as an assistant professor at the University of Maryland, where she stayed until 1992 (having been made an associate professor in 1979 and a full professor in 1992). During her time at the University of Maryland, she held fellowships with the Center for Advanced Study in the Behavioral Sciences at Stanford, the John Simon Guggenheim Memorial Foundation, and the Rockefeller Residency Program in Atlantic History at Johns Hopkins.

Spiegel was a full professor at Johns Hopkins from 1993 to 2023, where she served as chair of the history department from 1999 to 2002 and from 2005 to 2008. During her time at Johns Hopkins, she twice served as directeur d'Etudes associé at the Ecole des Hautes Etudes en Sciences Sociales. In 2011, she was named a Gilman Scholar.

Before her election as president of the American Historical Association in 2007, she had served as vice-president (research division) from 2000 to 2003. While chair of the history department at Johns Hopkins, she also served as dean of faculty from 2005 to 2007 and as interim dean in 2010. She has supervised the completion of seventeen Ph.D.s and taught both graduate- and undergraduate-level courses on medieval history and historiography.

== Work ==
Spiegel's work focuses on the theory and practice of historiography, both in the Middle Ages and in the modern era. Her publications on these topics include The Chronicle Tradition of Saint‐Denis: A Survey (1978), Romancing the Past: The Rise of Vernacular Prose Historiography in Thirteenth-Century France (1993), The Past as Text: The Theory and Practice of Medieval Historiography (1997), and Practicing History: New Directions in Historical Writing after the Linguistic Turn (2005), as well as some sixty articles on medieval historiography and contemporary theories of historical writing. Many of her articles and books have been translated into other languages such as Japanese, French, German, Italian, Hungarian, Spanish and Chinese.

Her best-known theoretical work is "History, Historicism and the Social Logic of the Text in the Middle Ages," published in the academic journal Speculum in 1990. In this article, Spiegel addresses the challenges that the linguistic turn poses to the historical profession and offers the "social logic of the text" as an interpretive lens. This lens locates written sources within the social, political, and economic currents that shaped the discourse of the moment while simultaneously foregrounding the active nature of the author’s work in reconstituting and reshaping reality. Her 1993 monograph, Romancing the Past: The Rise of Vernacular Prose Historiography in Thirteenth-Century France sought to demonstrate the utility of such an approach to historical sources.

== Research awards and honours ==
- Elected fellow, American Academy of Arts and Sciences, 2011.
- Named Gilman Scholar, Johns Hopkins University, 2011.
- Elected President, American Historical Association, 2008–2009.
- Appointed Krieger-Eisenhower University Professor (of History), Johns Hopkins University, 2003.
- Elected Vice-President for Research Division, American Historical Association, 2000–2003.
- Elected fellow, Medieval Academy of America, 1996.
- Berkshire Conference of Women Historians' Article Prize for "History, Historicism and the Social Logic of the Text in the Middle Ages," 1989–1990.
- William Koren, Jr. Prize for Best Article on French History from Society for French Historical Studies for "Social Change and Literary Language: The Textualization of the Past in Thirteenth-Century Old French Historiography," 1988.
- Fellowship, John Simon Guggenheim Foundation, 1988.
- Phi Beta Kappa, Johns Hopkins University, 1974.

== Selected works ==
=== Books ===
- The Chronicle Tradition of Saint-Denis: A Survey (Leiden and Boston: Medieval Classics: Texts and Studies, no. 10, 1978). OCLC 715597893
- Romancing the Past: The Rise of Vernacular Prose Historiography in Thirteenth-Century France, (Berkeley and Los Angeles: University of California Press, 1993). ISBN 978-0-520-08935-8
- The Past as Text: The Theory and Practice of Medieval Historiography (Baltimore: Johns Hopkins Press, 1997). ISBN 978-0-8018-6259-5
- Practicing History: New Directions in Historical Writing after the Linguistic Turn, edited with an introduction (London: Routledge, 2005). ISBN 978-0-415-34108-0

=== Translations ===
- -- with Stephen Nichols, Kantorowicz: Stories of a Historian (Baltimore and London: Johns Hopkins Press, 2001).

=== Articles ===
- Spiegel, Gabrielle M. (1971). "The Reditus Regni ad Stirpem Karoli Magni: A New Look". French Historical Studies. 7 (2): 145–174. doi:10.2307/285981. JSTOR 285981.
- Spiegel, Gabrielle M. (1975). "The cult of Saint Denis and Capetian kingship". Journal of Medieval History. 1: 43–69. doi:10.1016/0304-4181(75)90031-7.
- Spiegel, Gabrielle M. (1975). "Political Utility in Medieval Historiography: A Sketch". History and Theory. 14 (3): 314–325. doi:10.2307/2504866. JSTOR 2504866.
- Spiegel, Gabrielle M. (1977). "'Defense of the realm': Evolution of a Capetian propaganda slogan". Journal of Medieval History. 3 (2): 115–133. doi:10.1016/0304-4181(77)90003-3.
- Hindman, Sandra; Spiegel, Gabrielle M. (1981). "The Fleur-de-Lis Frontispieces to Guillaume de Nangis's Chronique abrégée: Political Iconography in Late Fifteenth-Century France". Viator. 12: 381–408. doi:10.1484/J.VIATOR.2.301493.
- Spiegel, Gabrielle M. (1983). "Genealogy: Form and Function in Medieval Historical Narrative". History and Theory. 22 (1): 43–53. doi:10.2307/2505235. JSTOR 2505235.
- "History as Enlightenment: Suger and the Mos Anagogicus," in Abbot Suger and the Abbey Church of Saint-Denis, ed. Paula Gerson, Metropolitan Museum of Art, NY, 1986, pp. 17–27.
- Spiegel, Gabrielle M. (1986). "Pseudo-Turpin, the crisis of the aristocracy and the beginnings of vernacular historiography in France". Journal of Medieval History. 12 (3): 207–223. doi:10.1016/0304-4181(86)90032-1.
- "Social Change and Literary Language: The Textualization of the Past in Thirteenth-Century French Historiography", Journal of Medieval and Renaissance Studies, 17 (1987): 129–148.
- Spiegel, Gabrielle M. (1990). "History, Historicism, and the Social Logic of the Text in the Middle Ages". Speculum. 65 (1): 59–86. doi:10.2307/2864472. JSTOR 2864472. S2CID 145562551.
- Spiegel, Gabrielle M. (1992). "History and Post-Modernism". Past and Present (135): 194–208. doi:10.1093/past/135.1.194.
- Spiegel, Gabrielle M. (1993). "Medieval Canon Formation and the Rise of Royal Historiography in Old French Prose". MLN. 108 (4): 638–658. doi:10.1353/mln.1993.0006. S2CID 162242479.
- Spiegel, Gabrielle M. (1999). "CHAPTER 12. In the Mirrors Eye: The Writing of Medieval History in America". In Molho, Anthony; Wood, Gordon S (eds.). Imagined Histories. pp. 238–262. doi:10.1515/9780691187341-014. ISBN 978-0-691-18734-1.
- Freedman, Paul; Spiegel, Gabrielle M. (1998). "Medievalisms Old and New: The Rediscovery of Alterity in North American Medieval Studies". The American Historical Review. 103 (3): 677. doi:10.2307/2650568. JSTOR 2650568.
- Spiegel, Gabrielle M. (2001). "Foucault and the Problem of Genealogy". The Medieval History Journal. 4: 1–14. doi:10.1177/097194580100400101. S2CID 162411392.
- "Historical Thought in Medieval Europe," in Lloyd Kramer and Sarah Maza, eds., A Companion to Western Historical Thought, (Oxford, 2002): 78–98.
- Spiegel, Gabrielle M. (2002). "Memory and History: Liturgical Time and Historical Time". History and Theory. 41 (2): 149–162. doi:10.1111/0018-2656.00196.
- Spiegel, Gabrielle M. (2007). "Revising the Past / Revisiting the Present: How Change Happens in Historiography". History and Theory. 46 (4): 1–19. doi:10.1111/j.1468-2303.2007.00425.x.
- "The Task of the Historian (American Historical Association Presidential Address), American Historical Review (February 2009): 1–14.
