= Grandes Chroniques de France =

Medieval illustrated manuscript

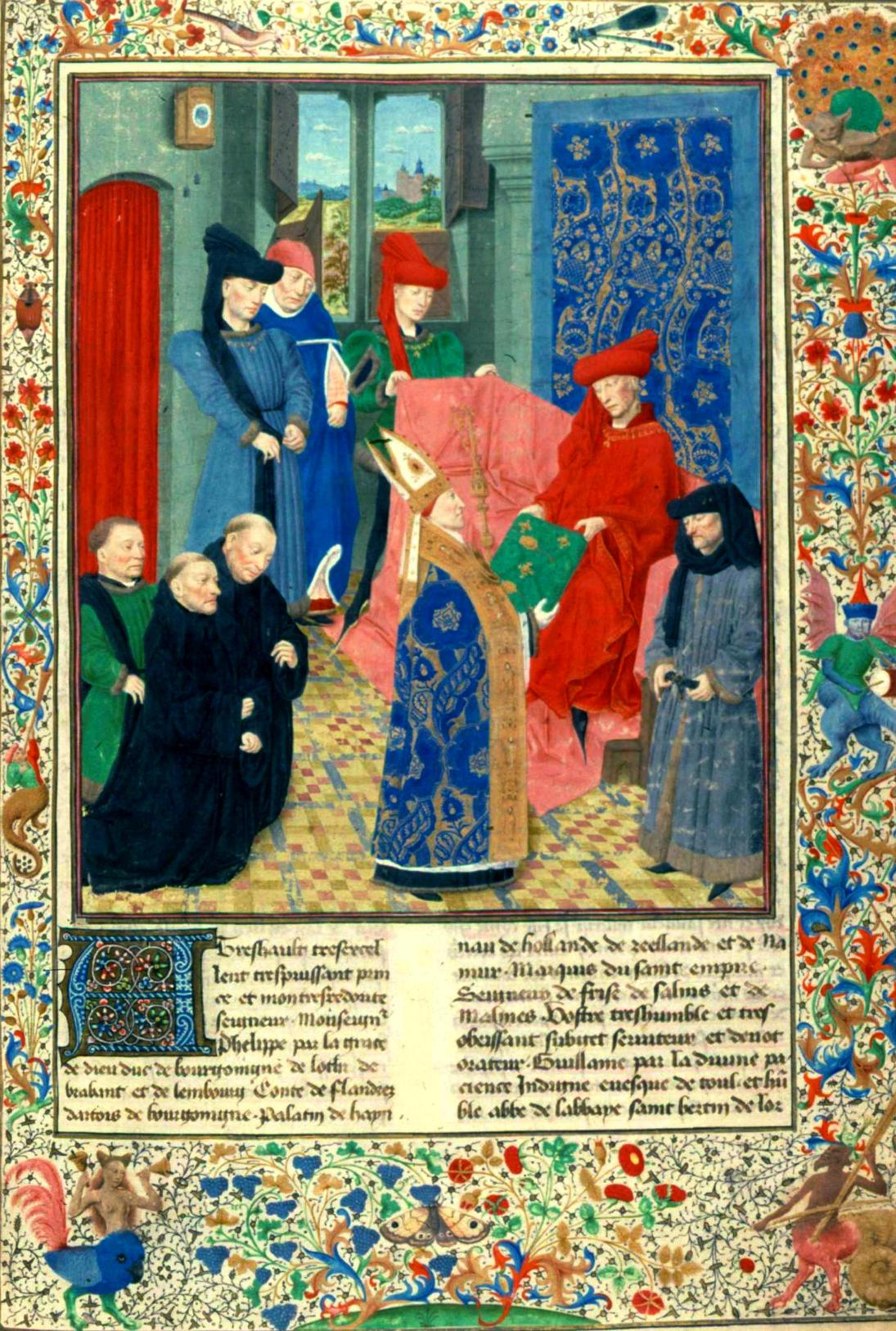
Philip the Good, Duke of Burgundy, with Chancellor Nicolas Rolin and the future Charles the Bold, accepts his copy of the Grandes Chroniques de France from Guillaume Fillastre on 1 January 1457. As often this presentation miniature is in the book itself, which is now in St Petersburg. This book contains the Burgundian version for later periods.

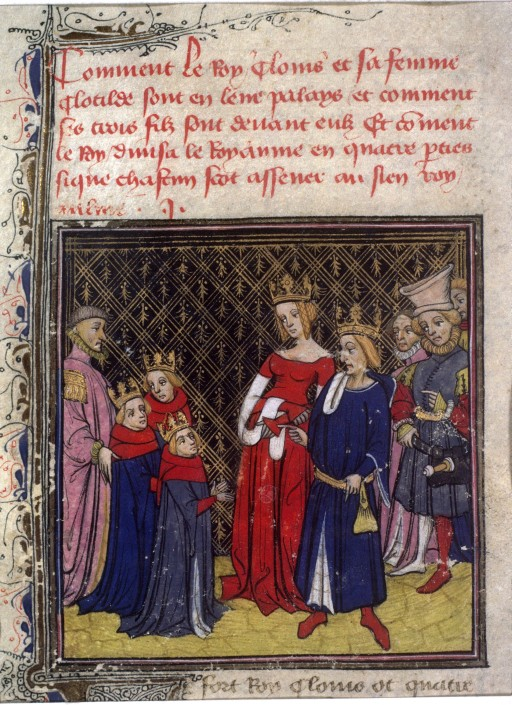
Clovis I of the Franks, Clotilde and his sons, 14th-century

The Grandes Chroniques de France is a vernacular royal compilation of the history of the Kingdom of France, most manuscripts of which are luxury copies that are heavily illuminated. Copies were produced between the thirteenth and fifteenth centuries, the text being extended at intervals to cover recent events. It was first compiled in the reign of Saint Louis (d. 1270), who wished to preserve the history of the Franks, from the coming of the Trojans to his own time, in an official chronography whose dissemination was tightly controlled. It was continued under his successors until completed in 1461. It covers the Merovingian, Carolingian, and Capetian dynasties of French kings, with illustrations depicting personages and events from virtually all their reigns.

It survives in approximately 130 manuscripts, varying in the richness, number and artistic style of their illuminations, copied and amended for royal and courtly patrons, the central work of vernacular official historiography. Over 75 copies are illustrated, with between one and over 400 scenes shown; analysis of the selections of subjects reveals the changing political preoccupations of the different classes of patrons over time.

Following the contemporary styles of illustration seen in other manuscripts, early copies had mostly fairly small scenes, normally with a patterned background rather than a landscape or interior setting. In front of this a number of figures were engaged in key historical moments, especially battles, coronations, weddings and important meetings. There might be over 200 such scenes illustrated, often collected together as individual compartments in a full-page miniature with a decorated framework. By the mid-15th century the number of illustrations was fewer, around 50 even in lavish copies, but the miniatures were larger, and now had lovingly detailed landscape or interior backgrounds. Scenes of ceremonial moments, now often including large crowds, had become more popular, though battles retained their place.

== Text ==
The Grandes Chroniques de France had its origin as a French translation of the Latin histories written and updated by the monks of Saint-Denis, who were, from the thirteenth century, official historiographers to the French kings. As first written, the Grandes Chroniques traced the history of the French kings from their origins in Troy to the death of Philip II of France (1223). The continuations of the text were drafted first at Saint-Denis and then at the court in Paris. Its final form brought the chronicle down to the death of Charles V of France in the 1380s.

There are also Burgundian variants, which give a different account of the final period, a product of the dissention which finally led to the Armagnac–Burgundian Civil War in 1407–1435. Philip the Good's copy follows the Paris text up to 1226, but then uses Guillaume de Nangis' Chronicon up to 1327, and then Flemish chronicles from the monasteries of Saint Bertin and Notre Dame at Saint-Omer. The compiler, Abbot Guillaume Fillastre of Saint Bertin, aimed to promote Philip's claim to the French throne. He is shown handing over the work to Philip in the presentation miniature by Simon Marmion in Philip's copy.

Sources for material on the reign of Charlemagne included the Historia Caroli Magni, also known as the "Pseudo-Turpin Chronicle", and the Vita Karoli Magni by Einhard. Other sources included Abbot Suger's Life of Louis VI.

== Manuscripts ==
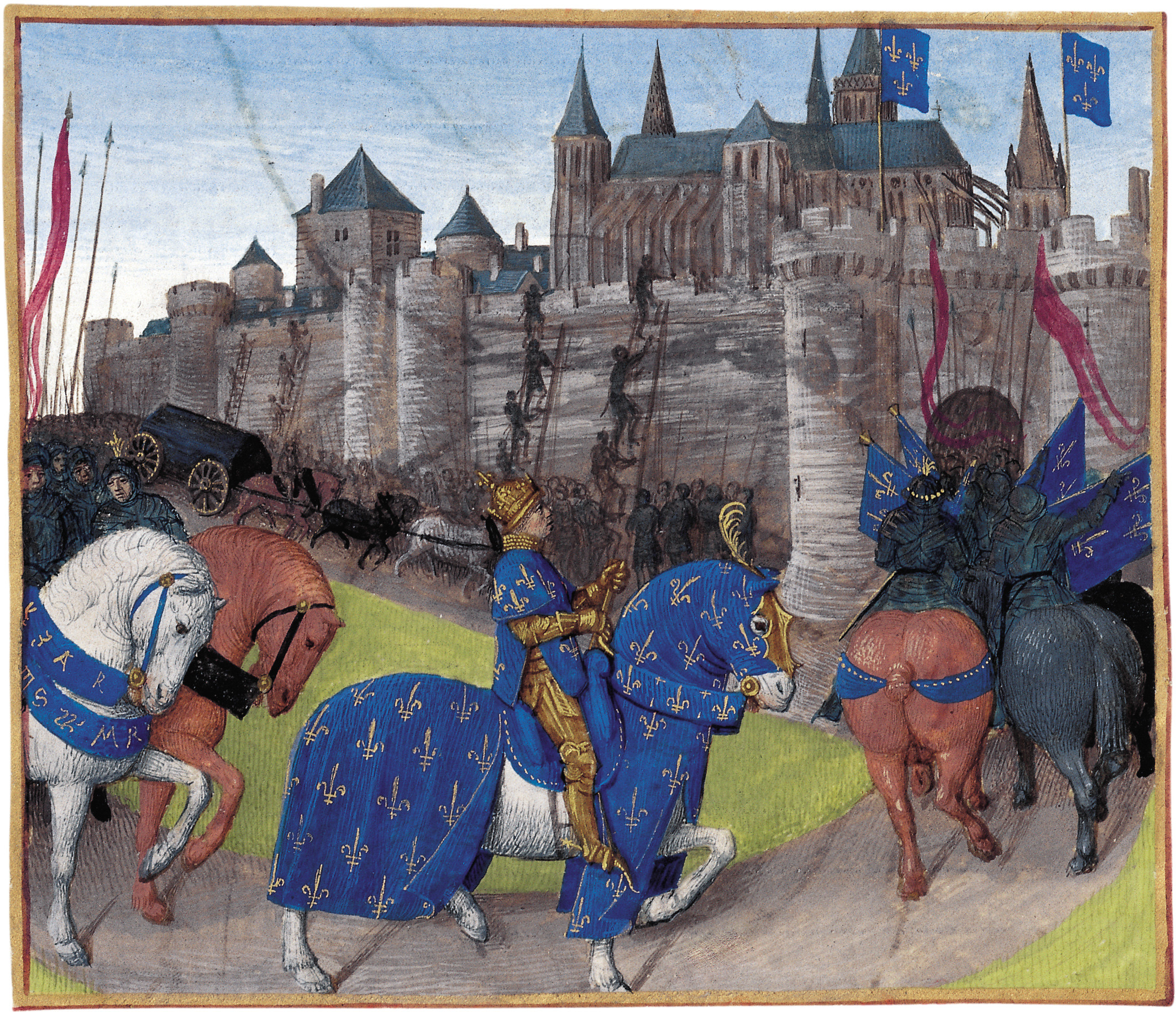
Philip II of France captures Tours in 1189. Jean Fouquet

The earliest surviving version is that of Primat de Saint-Denis, a copy of which was presented to Philip III of France in about 1274, with 36 miniatures (many with multiple scenes) and historiated initials by Parisian artists. These were mostly derived from other manuscript sources, but ingeniously focused into a coherent programme of illustration reflecting the points the abbey wished the king to absorb, regarding both its own aspirations and the nature of kingship in general.

Especially fine are the illustrated copies made for Charles V of France (BnF, Ms. Fr. 2813), Charles VII of France, illuminated by Jean Fouquet (1455–1460, BnF, Ms. Fr. 6465, above), and Philip the Good of Burgundy, now in the Russian National Library, Saint Petersburg (1457, above).

For the first 150 years of the Grandes Chroniques's existence, its audience was carefully circumscribed: its readership was centered in the royal court at Paris, and its owners included French kings, members of the royal family and the court, and a few highly connected clerics in northern France. During this period, there were no copies of the work that belonged to members of the Parlement or the university community.

But from the mid-15th century a number of unillustrated copies survive "on paper or on mixtures of parchment and paper that belonged (when provenance is known) to secretaries and notaries and to members of the Parlement. These inexpensive books filled a practical need; they provided a chronology for persons charged with maintaining the state archives and doubtless also assisted them in their increasingly common role as writers of history". Latterly, under the Valois Dukes of Burgundy, it spread there as well, and copies were given to foreign royalty.

Of the three copies (not all complete) in the Royal manuscripts, British Library, representing most of what survives from the medieval English royal library, one may have come to England after the capture of John II of France 1356 at the Battle of Poitiers (Ms Royal 19 D. ii). An unusually late copy, never finished, was begun in Calais in 1487, commissioned by the Treasurer of the English enclave for presentation to the new Henry VII of England. The miniatures that were completed seem to be by English artists.

Printed copies on vellum, which were then illuminated, were produced in Paris by Antoine Vérard, who specialized in such hybrids, and normal editions by others, but by around 1500 the work seems to have been regarded as outdated, and was replaced by other texts. Altogether only four early print editions were made, all in Paris. These were in 1477, 1493, 1514 and 1518.
