= Sir Edward de Warren =

Sir Edward de Warren was an illegitimate son of John de Warenne, 7th Earl of Surrey by his mistress Maud de Nerford of Norfolk. (Note: Bloomfield mistakenly referred to Maud as "Concubine to William Earl Warren." She was not. John de Warrenne was the earl during this time and Maud de Nerford was his mistress. All children that the earl was father of were illegitimate.) He was lord of the manor of Skeyton and also held other lands in Norfolk. His son Sir John de Warren (c. 1343 - 25 November 1386) was the first of this surname to succeed to the manors of Stockport and Poynton in Cheshire, and Woodplumpton in Lancashire.

== Family and early life ==
In 1306, Edward's father John de Warenne was married to Joan of Bar. She was a daughter of count Henry III of Bar, and Eleanor of England, Countess of Bar, the eldest daughter of king Edward I of England. The marriage was not a success. In 1309, King Edward II of England granted leave for John to make anyone he wanted heir to the lands that he held. But he wanted surety that any heir that he may have by his wife Joan would not to be disinherited. The earl was living openly with Maud by 1311.

Edward's mother Maud de Nerford was a daughter of Sir William de Nerford of Narford, by his wife Petronilla, a daughter of Sir John de Vaux. On 8 March 1315 in a notice read out to Joan of Bar, Countess of Surrey for a petition of the divorce of Joan and the earl, she was described as "Maud of Neyrford, daughter of the former William of Neyrford Knight, deceased, of the diocese of Norwich." Her father William had died in 1300, and Petronilla his wife was William's heir. Among Maud's siblings were John and Thomas de Nerford who were later Knighted and also Edmund. In 1315 John de Warenne granted his manor of Saddlescombe in Sussex to Thomas de Nerford for life. In 1316 the earl granted to Edmund de Nerford the reversion of a messuage, two carucates of land, twenty four acres of meadow and ten marks of rent in Harrowby, Donisthorpe, Grantham, and Barkston. Sir John and Thomas de Nerford witnessed a charter with John de Warenne in 1317. (Note: John de Nerford died on 5 February in the 3rd year of the reign of Edward III (1328 or 1329). He held the manor of "Wysete" (Wissett) in Suffolk jointly with his wife Agnes, of the honour of Richmond. Thomas de Nerford, his brother was to become John's heir after the death of Agnes, John's wife. The age of Thomas at the date of John de Nerford's inquisition was roughly estimated to be 30 years and more. Edmund de Nerford, brother of John and Thomas had died by 17 February in the 5th year of Edward III's reign. Edmund held a moiety of the manor of "Hogstone" (Houghton) by Walsingham in Norfolk. He held this for life from a grant of Petronilla de Nerford, his mother. His brother Thomas de Nerford, Knight, son of Petronilla was Edmund's heir. Sir Thomas de Nerford died in 1344. He was survived by his son and heir John de Nerford who was around eight or nine when his father died. He was also survived by his wife Alice. He held the manor of Saddlescombe at death jointly with Alice his wife. In Norfolk, Sir Thomas held a moiety or part of the manors of Houghton, Holt, Cley, Panworth and Narford.)

Edward was not named in a land settlement dated 4 August 1316, and the earl's two sons, John and Thomas by Maud de Nerford were. Because of this it is probable that Edward was born after this date but before 1320, at which point the earl had "expelled Maud de Nerforde from his heart and his company." (Note: These words were written in a petition by the Earl John de Warren to the King. He was petitioning for the commission of oyer et terminer that had been set up against some of his men on complaint by John de Nerford, Maud's brother to be repealed. "Lady de Nerforde" described as John de Nerford's mother in this petition was Petronilla: "Earl Warenne asks that the commission of oyer et terminer against his men given to John de Mutforde, John Bakun, John de Redenhale, and John le Claver at the suit of John de Nerforde in Norfolk might be repealed, as these justices are of the fees and robes of Lady de Nerforde, John's mother, and are doing all the harm they can to his people because he has expelled Maud de Nerforde from his heart and his company. He suggests that John de Nerforde might sue against him at common law if it seems good to him." The complaint by John de Nerford was that John Sprygi, Simon Plesent, Robert de Reppes, John Caunceler and others broke into his close at Weasenham in Norfolk and carried away his goods. John de Nerford's mother Petronilla lived until 1326.) Maud de Nerford had died by 22 November 1345. By this date her sons John and Thomas had joined the order of the Knights Hospitallers of St John of Jerusalem at Clerkenwell Priory. They were not named in their father's will on 24 June 1347.

Between 1323 and 1324 Sir Ralf de Skeyton settled "Boton" (Booton, Norfolk) and Skeyton on himself for life. Oliver de Redham and Richard de Drenkeston or Drencheston acted as trustees. If Ralph died without heirs, the manors of Skeyton, and Booton, with appertunances and adowson of the churches were to go to Matilda (Maud) de Nerford. And if Maud died "without heirs of her body so procreated" (Note: Which shows that the following named Ralph and Edward in this 1324 fine, were recognised as sons of Maud, but were regarded as being illegitimate. Also the fact that Ralph was named first in the fine before Edward, indicates that he was the oldest of the two brothers.) they were to go first to her son Ralph. If Ralph died with no heirs they were to go to Maud's other son Edward. In 1326 Maud de Nerford retained a messuage, land, and the fourth part of a messuage in Cawston, Booton, Brandiston, and Skeyton acquired from Richard de Drencheston and Oliver de Redham.

In 1334, Edward's brother Ralph was named "Ravlyn son of the Earl of Warenne" in a parliamentary petition by Ralph le Botiller (Butler). On 20 November 1338, John de Warren, Earl of Surrey had a licence to "grant a sixth part of the barony of Wich-Malbank to John de Gaydon and William de Blorton, in trust to grant the same to John Mautravers and Joan his wife, for life, with remainder to Ralph de Warrenne, and Joan his wife, and the heirs of their bodies, and, them failing, to the right heirs of the said Joan, wife of the aforesaid John Mautravers." Ralph and his wife Joan obtained the sixth part of the barony.

Ralph de Warren died without issue, sometime prior to 1342, when his widow Joan, a daughter of Nicholas Percy, had become the wife of Peter de Brewes. He was not named in the will of his father written on 24 June 1347. On 20 October 1349, Peter de Brewes was recorded as lord of the manor of Skeyton, and Ralph's then recently deceased brother Edward had been lord of that manor prior to his death. Joan, Ralph's widow was divorced from Peter between 27 January 1352 and 24 October 1352, and then married to Alan Cheney before 1353. She died on 15 August 1370. Alan Cheney died 28 June 1384. After Alan Cheney's death, the sixth part of the barony of Wich-Malbank in Cheshire descended to Alice, wife of John Browning as "daughter and heir of Joan, wife of John Mautravers, and sister and heir of Joan wife of Alan." Alice, wife of John Browning and her sister Joan (who firstly married Ralph de Warren) were actually half-sisters: Their mother was born Joan Foliot, who first married Nicholas Percy and by him had Joan who was born in 1321. Nicholas Percy died on 6 August 1324. Joan the widow of Nicholas Percy, then married John Mautravers, and their daughter Alice was born 29 September 1325. Alice later married John Browning. John Mautravers died, and his widow Joan (born Foliot), then married Alexander Venables. Joan Venables died in 1347. In that year two Cheshire inquisition post mortems were taken: One indicated that Joan, aged 26 years, a daughter of Nicholas Percy and then currently wife of Peter de Brewes was the next heir of Joan Venables. The other inquisition stated the same but also detailed that Alice, daughter of John Mautravers was also heir to Joan Venables, and Alice and Joan were sisters.

== Marriage ==
He married Cicely, a daughter of Nicholas de Eton by his wife Joan, a daughter of Richard de Stokeport, lord of Stockport.

== His lands in Norfolk ==
In 1346, Felicia the widow of Ralph de Skeyton was recorded as holding Booton. Felicia held this of the heirs of Thomas de Nerford. (Note: Although the identity of Felicia wife of Ralph de Skeyton is unknown, William de Nerford did have a daughter by this name. In 1313, "Felicia, daughter of William de Narford" was granted licence to acquire rents to a moiety of an acre of land in Raynham, Norfolk which is nearby to Narford.) Edward de Warren was recorded as holding lands in "Skegton" (Skeyton) in that year. Both places were within the hundred of South Erpingham in Norfolk. He also held lands in Norfolk or was joint mesne lord of lands and tenements in "Crostweyt" (Crostwick), Berton and Tibenham, and Rougham and Fransham outside of the hundred of South Erpingham. Edward held two parts of a fee of lands in Skeyton in the hundred of South Erpingham, and Crostwick, Berton and Tibenham outside of this hundred of the heirs of Fulk Baniard which had formerly been held by John de "Skegton" (Skeyton). (Note: "Edwardus de Warrenne, miles, tenet in Skegton in dicto hundredo, Crostweyt, Berton et Tybenham duas partes j. f. m. de heredibus Fulconis Baniard, et dicti heredes de domino rege, quod quondam fuit Johannis de Skegton xxvj.s. viij.d." Bloomfield is therefore mistaken in the following statement: "In 1345, Sir William de Warren, Knt. held two parts of a fee in Skeyton, Boton, Crostweyt, and Tibenham, of the heirs of Fulk Baniard." Sir Edward de Warren's son, Sir John de Warren died on 25 November 1386, and was buried at Booton in Norfolk. His widow Margaret then married John Mainwaring of Over Peover, Cheshire. John Mainwaring listed as "Johannes Maynwaryn," was recorded as holding these lands by two parts of a fee of the heirs of Fulk Baniard in 1401: "Johannes Maynwaryn tenet in Skeggeton in dicto hundredo, Crostweyt Berton, et Tybenham extra dictum hundredum duas partes j. f, m. de heredibus Fulconis Baniard, domini de Haddystoun, quod Johannes Stuclee tenet de comite Rutlandie, ut de jure uxoris sue, et idem de rege, ut parcellam baronie vocate Baniardescastell." Also in this same year, Roger Boys, Henry Betelee, and Henry Lesyngham held land in Crostweyt (Crostwick) of the heirs of John de Warren. And land in Berton was held in 1401 of the heirs of John de Warren. John Mainwaring held Booton in 1401 of the heirs of Thomas de Nerford.)With William Whitwell, Edward was a joint mesne lord of lands and tenements in Crostwick and Berton in the hundred of Tunstede.

== Discharged from finding a man-at-arms ==
On 22 April 1346 Edward, named as the son of John Earl Warenne of Surrey and Stratherne, was ready to serve the King abroad. Warrenne's son William was also ready to serve the king. But the earl asked the Chancellor to discharge Edward from finding a man-at-arms for his lands in Norfolk. Edward is recorded in the rolls of Crécy and Calais in the retinue of William de Warrenne, his brother or half-brother.

== Left a legacy in his father's will ==
His father's will was written on 24 June 1347 at Conisbrough Castle. Edward was left twenty pounds in this will. He had not yet been Knighted at this date.

== The advowson of Itteringham (1348-1349) ==
In 1348 he was named as "Sir Edward de Warren, Knight" and held a portion named "Bintre's Portion" of the adowson of Itteringham.

In 1349 Edward was involved in a trial which concerned who held the adowson of Itteringham, and therefore had the right to present a rector there. The trial was between Sir Edward, and Maud, the widow of John de Dallying. It was found that agreements were made by deeds, that they should present alternatively.

== Death ==
Edward was dead by 20 October 1349. On this date a commission of oyer and terminer was instituted on complaint by Peter de Brewes. In relation to Skeyton at this time, he was referred to as "Edward de Garrenne, late lord of that manor" and Cicely his widow was still alive. Peter de Brewes was lord of the manor of Skeyton at this time, and a rent of 10 Marks was due to him which had been accumulated by Edward. Two of Peter's servants took cattle from "Cicely, late the wife of the said Edward" for half of the rent in arrears. But the cattle were rescued, and the servants who took this cattle were assaulted.

== His son Sir John de Warren (c. 1343 - 25 November 1386) ==
Edward's son John de Warren by his wife Cicely, was around the age of 26 years in 1369. On 8 March 1370 at Erpingham in Norfolk, Sir Robert de Erpingham and his son Sir John signed their names to a charter, along with Sir Robert de Salle and Sir John de Colby, all testifying that John de Warren was the next heir of Isabel, daughter of Sir Richard de Stokeport (or de Eton: Sir Richard's grandmother was Joan de Stokeport. She was the eldest daughter and sole heiress of the Lord of Stockport. Sir Richard's grandfather was Nicholas de Eton.Sir Richard's father, Robert de Eton brother of Cicely, and uncle of John de Warren, succeeded to the manor of Stockport and was commonly known as Robert de Stokeport.) and Isabel had died in 1369. Sir Robert de Erpingham, and his son Sir John were grandfather and father respectively of Sir Thomas Erpingham. They testified that John was the son of Sir Edward de Warren and his mother was Cicely, a daughter of Nicholas de Eton, and John de Warren was heir to Isabel because they both shared a common ancestor in Nicholas. Isabel's inquisition post mortem was taken in March 1370 at Chester. She was John's cousin once removed. His paternity, maternity, estimated age, and relationship to Isabel are detailed in that inquisition:

"...she died in the feast of St.Luke the Evangelist (October 18th), 43 Edward III (1369), and John, the son of Sir Edward Warren, Knt., is next of kin and next heir, namely son of a certain Cicely, sister of Robert de Stokeport, father of the said Sir Richard de Stokeport, Knt., father of the said Isabella, and the said John is of the age of 26 years and more." From this, John de Warren succeeded to the manor of Bredbury, and also lands in Romiley, Werneth, and Etchells.

In the same year as Isabel's inquisition, John de Warren held "Bintre's Portion" of the adowson of Itteringham in Norfolk. His father Edward held this same portion of that adowson in 1348.

He married Margaret, daughter of Sir John de Stafford in 1371. John had been Knighted by 1379, and held the adowson of Skeyton that year presenting Roger de Schevesby as rector. (Note: On 20 April 1383, Sir John de Warren was recorded in a writ of supersedeas by mainprise which involved Roger parson of Skeggton (Skeyton): "To the sheriff of Norffolk. Writ of supersedeas, by mainprise of William de Snetesham, William de Basyngham and John de Beston of Norffolk and Roger de Blaby of Leycestershire, in favour of Roger parson of Skeggeton at suit of John de Warenne knight averring threats.")

Sir John later succeeded to the manors of Stockport, Poynton, and Woodplumpton as did his heirs. On 19 March 1386, he witnessed a charter with Sir Thomas Erpingham, at Brandiston, just under two miles from Booton, Norfolk.

He died on 25 November 1386 and was buried at Booton. His widow Margaret married John Mainwaring of Over Peover, who was recorded as holding Booton and Skeyton in 1401. John Mainwaring was dead by 1410.

Sir John de Warren and Margaret had a son named Nicholas de Warren who married Agnes, a daughter of Sir Richard Winnington. Nicholas predeceased his mother Margaret who died in 1418, and had a son Lawrence de Warren, named as heir to his grandmother Margaret in her inquisition, and listed as 24 years and above. One of the witnesses to this inquisition post mortem in 1418 was John de Whitwell of Felmingham, which is very close to Skeyton in Norfolk.
