= Henry of Bar (disambiguation) =

Henry of Bar may refer to:

- Henry I of Bar (r. 1170–1190)
- Henry II of Bar (r. 1214–1239)
- Henry III of Bar (r. 1291–1302)
- Henry IV of Bar (r. 1336–1344)
- Henry of Bar (d. 1397), marquis de Pont-à-Mousson
