= Joan of Bar, Countess of Surrey =

French-English noblewoman (c. 1295–1361)

Joan of Bar
- Born: c. 1295
- Died: 1361; London
- Noble family: Montbéliard
- Spouse: John de Warenne, 7th Earl of Surrey
- Father: Henry III, Count of Bar
- Mother: Eleanor of England

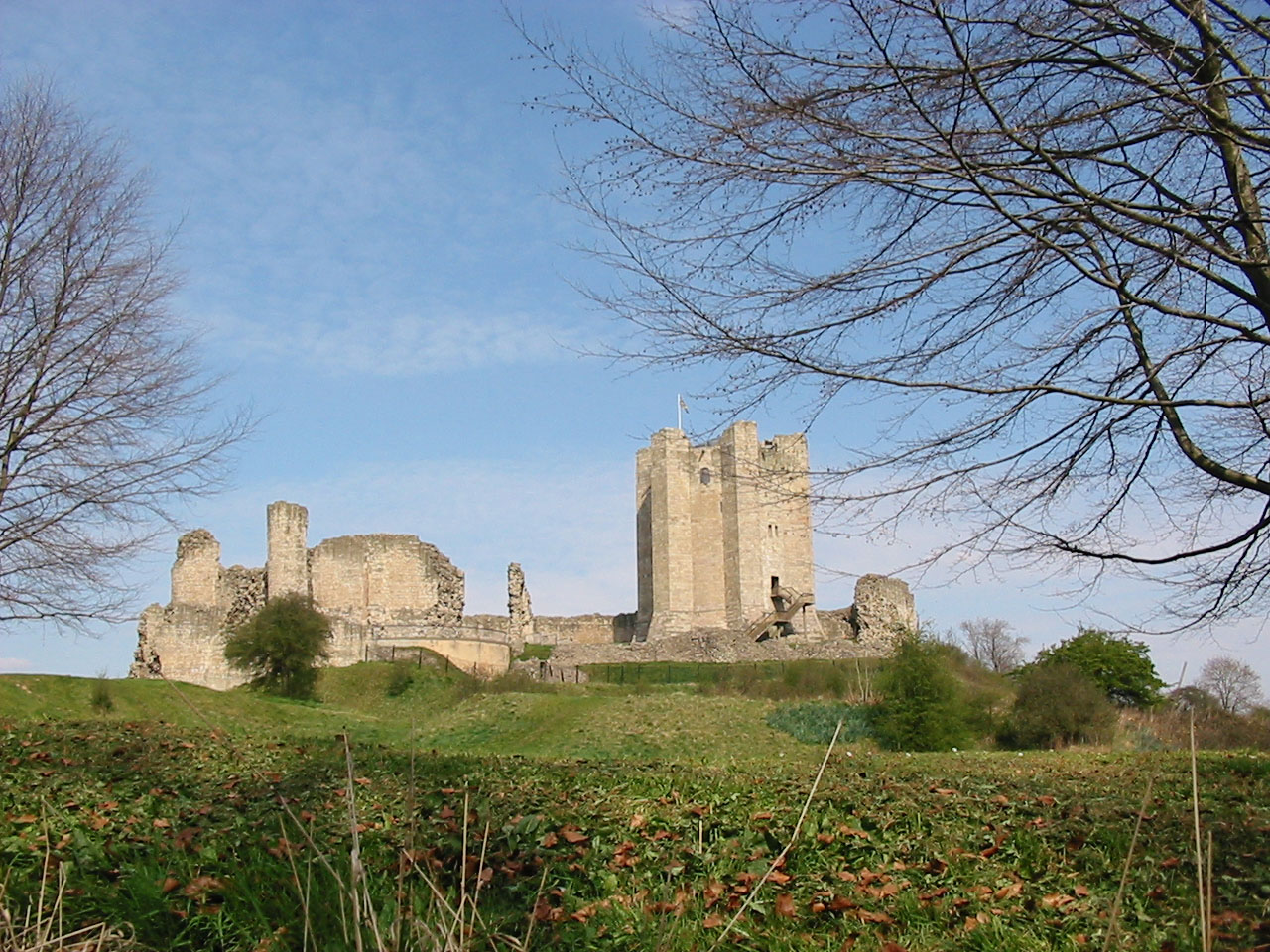
Joan lived in Conisbrough Castle for some time because her husband abandoned her.

Joan of Bar (died 1361) was a French-English noble. She acted as regent of the County of Bar for her great-nephew Robert in 1353-1356. She was a daughter of Henry III, Count of Bar and Eleanor of England, and niece of Edward II of England. She was unhappily married to John de Warenne, 7th Earl of Surrey.

== Life ==
On 25 May 1306, Joan was married to one of the leading nobles of England, John de Warenne, 7th Earl of Surrey, a "nasty, brutal man with scarcely one redeeming quality". She lived at the Warenne family estates, Conisbrough Castle and Sandal Castle, abandoned by her husband, who since 1313 had been trying to divorce her. In England, she was close to Isabella of France, her aunt by marriage (Isabella’s husband Edward II was Joan’s maternal uncle) who was about her same age, and spent time with her at court. She was probably close to her cousin Elizabeth de Clare, who left Joan an image of John the Baptist in her will.

After four unhappy years of marriage, Warenne alleged in 1313 that the union was unlawful because Joan was related to him in the third and fourth degree, and because he had been "precontracted" to Maud of Nerford before marrying Joan. He was living openly with Maud by 1311. In 1313 the King arranged for his yeoman William Aune to take Joan from Conisbrough Castle, and bring her to him. Edward II of England then paid all Joan's expenses while she lodged at the Tower of London. Despite Warenne's claims, a divorce was never granted.

=== Regency ===
In 1345, Joan was invited by Philip VI of France to act as regent of the County of Bar for her great-nephew Edward II, Count of Bar. However, she was challenged by her nephew's widow Yolande of Dampierre, who secured the regency instead.

Edward died in 1352 and his brother Robert was proclaimed duke at only seven years old. Political problems associated with his mother Yolande's continued position as regent had arisen. Yolande was on the point of remarrying to Philip of Navarre, count of Longueville, a member of the Navarre family which was attempting to claim the French crown from John the Good. Joan of Bar, Robert's grandaunt, made known to the king that she was ready to replace Yolande and assume the regency.

The Parlement of Paris, by decree of 5 June 1352, declared that the county was under the king's control. John the Good then entrusted the regency to Joan on 27 July of that year. Yolande initially renounced the regency, but then went back on her decision, levying troops to fight Joan. John the Good intervened, to force Yolande to renounce the regency again on 2 July 1353. Joan ruled for another three years.

=== Later life ===
The defeat of Poitiers and the capture of John the Good in 1356 deprived Joan of John's support, and Yolande retook the regency. Joan then returned to England. When John II of France was captured and imprisoned in London, she was allowed to visit him, and is said to have become his mistress.

Joan died in 1361 in London.

== Sources ==
- Earenfight, Theresa, ed. (2018). Royal and Elite Households in Medieval and Early Modern Europe. Brill.
- Ward, Jennifer (2013). English Noblewomen in the Later Middle Ages. Routledge.
- Phillips, J. R. S. (1972). Aymer de Valence, Earl of Pembroke, 1307-1324: Baronial Politics in the Reign of Edward II. Oxford University Press.114
