= Siege of Metz =

Siege of Metz may refer to:

- War of Metz, 1324
- Siege of Metz (1552), by the Holy Roman Empire during the Italian War of 1551–59
- Siege of Metz (1814), by the Prussians and Russians during the War of the Sixth Coalition
- Siege of Metz (1870), by the Prussians during the Franco-Prussian War

== See also ==
- Battle of Metz
