= John de Warenne =

John de Warenne may refer to:

- John de Warenne, 6th Earl of Surrey (1231–1304)
- John de Warenne, 7th Earl of Surrey (1286–1347)
