= Robert, Duke of Bar =

Robert I
- Duke of Bar; Marquis of Pont-à-Mousson
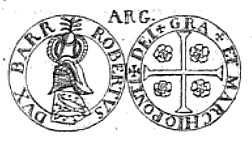
- In Latin around the edge 'Robertus, Dux Barr' (Robert, Duke of Bar)
- Born: 8 November 1344
- Died: 12 April 1411 (aged 66)
- Noble family: House of Scarponnois
- Spouse: Marie of Valois
- Issue among others...: Charles of Bar; Henry of Bar; Philip of Bar; Edward III, Duke of Bar; John of Bar; Louis, Duke of Bar; Marie of Bar; Yolande of Bar; Bonne of Bar
- Father: Henry IV of Bar
- Mother: Yolande of Flanders

Robert I of Bar (8 November 1344 – 12 April 1411) was Marquis of Pont-à-Mousson and Count and then Duke of Bar. He succeeded his elder brother Edward II of Bar as count in 1352. His parents were Henry IV of Bar and Yolande of Flanders.

When Robert was less than a year old, his father died and his elder brother, Edward II of Bar, became Count of Bar under their mother's regency. As neither Robert nor Edward had a strong constitution, Yolande obtained a papal dispensation from Clement VI to allow them to eat meat during periods of abstinence. When his brother Edward died, Robert was still only seven years old and political problems associated with his mother's continued position as regent had arisen.

Yolande was on the point of remarrying to Philip of Navarre, count of Longueville, a member of the Navarre family which was attempting to claim the French crown from John the Good. Joan of Bar, Robert's grandaunt, made known to the king that she was ready to replace Yolande and assume the regency. The Parlement of Paris, by decree of 5 June 1352, declared that the county was under the king's control. John the Good then entrusted the regency to Joan on 27 July of that year. Yolande initially renounced the regency, but then went back on her decision, levying troops to fight Joan. John the Good intervened to force Yolande to renounce the regency again on 2 July 1353.

In 1354 the County of Bar was raised to the status of duchy by King John the Good. That same year another possession, Pont-à-Mousson, was raised to a marquisate by Emperor Charles IV. Subsequent emperors recognised Robert's ducal title and his state's right to a vote in the Imperial Diet. It is unclear if Robert was regarded as a Peer of France after becoming duke.

The defeat of Poitiers and the capture of John the Good in 1356 deprived Joan of John's support and Yolande retook the regency. Robert was knighted in December 1356 and declared of age on 8 November 1359. He assisted at the coronation of Charles V of France at Reims on 9 May 1364, then at that of Charles VI of France on 4 November 1380. During Charles V's reign he fought in several engagements in 1374 during the campaign to eject the English from Normandy. In 1401, Robert ceded his duchy to his son Edward, but reserved the usufruct on it, bypassing his grandson Robert (son of Henry of Bar). The younger Robert unsuccessfully opposed this in the parliament of Paris that ran from 1406 to 1409. Charles VI's madness put him under the control of the Duke of Orleans and Duke of Burgundy. The elder Robert supported the duke of Orleans, and after that duke's assassination was more and more inclined to remain within his duchy. In his later years he suffered from attacks of gout that prevented him from walking.

== Marriage and issue ==
In 1364 he married Marie of Valois, the daughter of king John II of France and Bonne of Luxembourg. Their children were:

- Yolande of Bar, (1365–1431); in 1380 married John I of Aragon (1350 †1396).
- Henry of Bar, (1362–1397), Marquis de Pont-à-Mousson, seigneur de Marle; in 1384 married Marie de Coucy. Taken prisoner at the Battle of Nicopolis and died of the plague.
- Philippe (1372–1396); also killed at the Battle of Nicopolis.
- Charles (1373–1392), seigneur de Nogent-le-Rotrou.
- Marie (1374 †?); in 1384 married William II, Marquis of Namur, Margrave of Namur (1355 †1418).
- Louis I, Duke of Bar (between 1370 and 1375 – 26 June 1430); Bishop of Verdun, cardinal.
- Edward III of Bar (1377–1415), Duke of Bar; killed at the Battle of Agincourt.
- Yolande the younger (†1421); in 1400 married Adolf, Duke of Jülich-Berg (†1437).
- John of Bar, seigneur de Puisaye (1380–1415), lord of Puisaye; killed at the Battle of Agincourt.
- Bonne (†1436); in 1393 married Waleran III of Luxembourg, Count of Ligny (1357 †1415), Count of Ligny and of Saint-Pol.
- Jeanne (†1402); in 1393 married Théodore II Paléologue, Marquis of Montferrat (1361 †1418)

== Sources ==
- d'Arras, Jean (2012). Melusine; or, The Noble History of Lusignan. Translated by Maddox, Donald. The Pennsylvania State University Press.
- Barker, Juliet (2008). Agincourt: Henry V and the Battle That Made England. Little, Brown and Company.
- Bertelli, Sergio (1985). Le corti italiane del Rinascimento (in Italian). A. Mondadori.
- Brachmann, Christoph (2011). "The Crusade of Nicopolis, Burgundy, and the Entombment of Christ at Pont-a-Mousson". Journal of the Warburg and Courtauld Institutes. 74.
- Curry, Anne, ed. (2000). The Battle of Agincourt: Sources and Interpretations. The Boydell Press.
- Lanz, Eukene Lacarra, ed. (2002). Marriage and Sexuality in Medieval and Early Modern Iberia. Routledge.
- Souchal, Geneviève (1974). Masterpieces of Tapestry from the Fourteenth to the Sixteenth Century. Translated by Oxby, Richard A.H. Metropolitan Museum of Art.
- Vaughan, Richard (2009). Philip the Bold, The formation of the Burgundian State. The Boydell Press.

German nobility
Preceded by Edward II	Count of Bar; 1352 – 1354	Elevated to duchy
New title	Duke of Bar; 1354 – 1411	Succeeded by Edward III
