= Adulterine castle =

12th-century fortifications

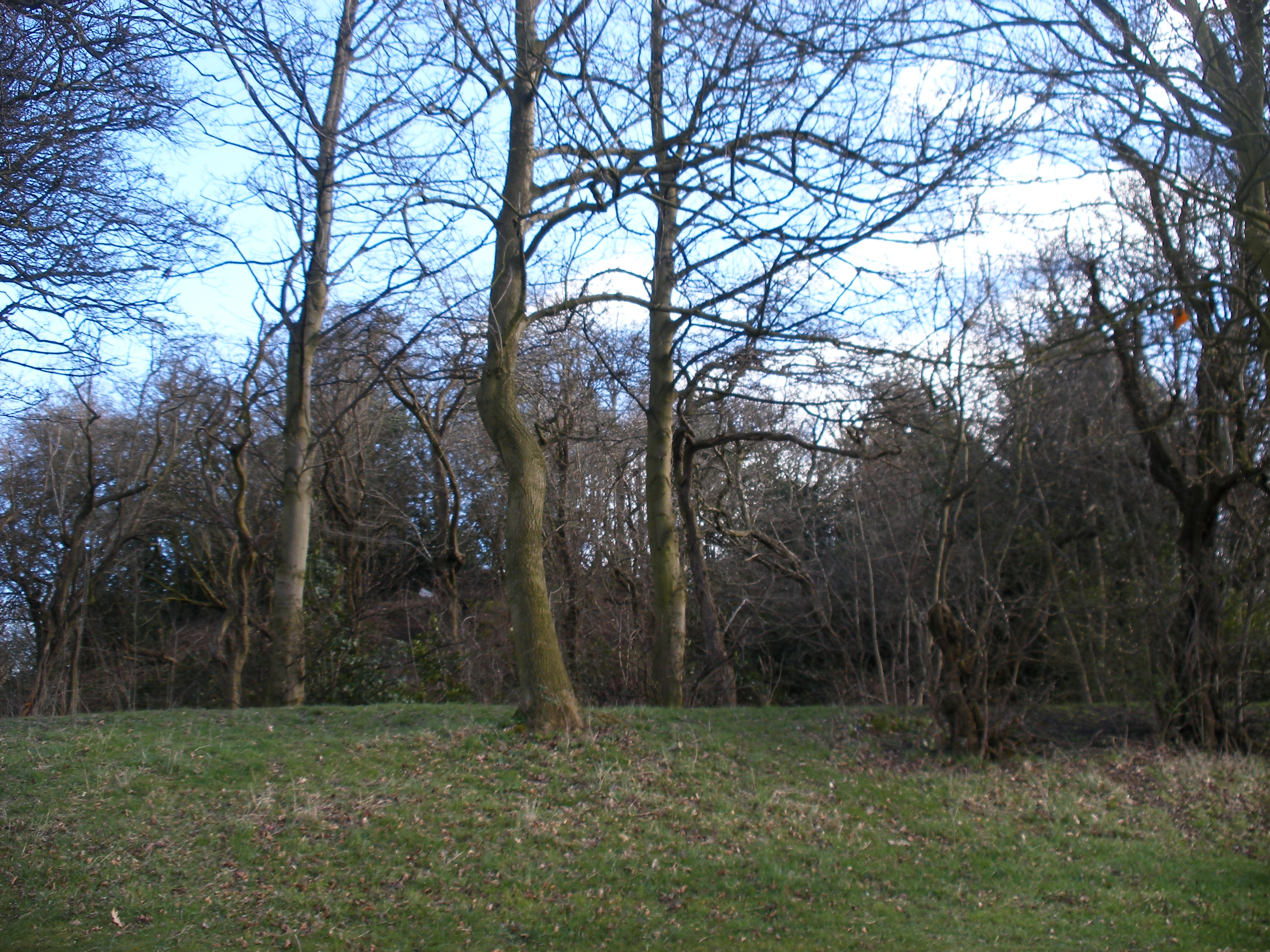
The remains of the adulterine Wakefield Castle

Adulterine castles were fortifications built in England during the 12th century without royal approval, particularly during the civil war of the Anarchy between 1139 and 1154.

== Details ==
During the civil war of the Anarchy, fought between the factions of Stephen of England and the Empress Matilda, both sides built a number of new castles to defend their territories and act as bases for expansion, typically motte and bailey designs such as those at Winchcombe, Upper Slaughter, or Bampton by the Empress's followers. Similarly, Stephen built a new chain of fen-edge castles at Burwell, Lidgate, Rampton, Caxton, and Swavesey – all about six to nine miles (ten to fifteen km) apart – in order to protect his lands around Cambridge.

Many of these castles were termed "adulterine", meaning unauthorised, because no formal permission was given for their construction. Traditionally the King retained the right to approve new castle construction, but in the chaos of the war this was no longer the case. Contemporary chroniclers saw this as a matter of concern; Robert of Torigny suggested that as many as 1,115 such castles had been built during the conflict, although this was probably an exaggeration as elsewhere he suggests an alternative figure of 126.

Matilda's son Henry II assumed the throne after the war and immediately announced his intention to eliminate the adulterine castles that had sprung up during the war, but it is unclear how successful this effort was. Robert of Torigny recorded that 375 were destroyed (slighted), without giving the details behind the figure; recent studies of selected regions have suggested that fewer castles were probably destroyed than once thought and that many may simply have been abandoned at the end of the conflict. Certainly many of the new castles were transitory in nature: archaeologist Oliver Creighton observes that 56 percent of those castles known to have been built during Stephen's reign have "entirely vanished".

The term "adulterine" has been challenged in late 20th-century and 21st century scholarship. Some argue that it gives too strong a sense of royal authority and authorisation in the years running up to the Anarchy and gives a misleading impression of the process of gaining permission for castle construction.

== See also ==
- The later practice of the licence to crenellate
- Slighting (deliberate destruction, partial or complete, of a fortification without opposition)
- Castles in Great Britain and Ireland (makes reference to both "The Anarchy" and "Adulterine castles" within a larger historical context and contains additional images)
