= Yolande of Dampierre =

French noblewoman

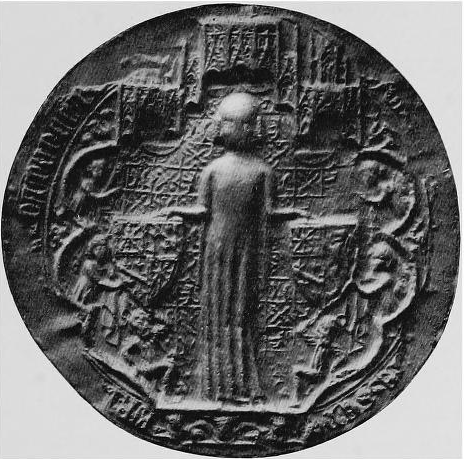
Yolande of Dampierre

Yolande of Dampierre, also known as Yolande of Flanders, Yolande of Kassel and Yolande of Bar (15 September 1326 – 12 December 1395), was Countess of Bar by marriage to Henry IV, Count of Bar. She was Regent of the County of Bar between 1344 and 1349 during the minority of her son Edward II, Count of Bar, and for her son Robert in 1352-1353 and 1356-1359.

== Biography ==
Yolande was the daughter of Robert of Cassel, lord of Marle and Cassel, and Joan of Brittany. She was the great-grandchild of Guy, Count of Flanders.

Yolande's older brother John died in 1332, when she was six. She then inherited the lands of Cassel in the duchy of Flanders. She was first betrothed to Louis of Male, but would end up marrying Henry IV, count of Bar in 1338.

=== Regency ===
Henry died four years later and Yolande was left with two children, Edward II, duke of Bar (1339-1352) and Robert (1344-1411). Yolande took over the regency until her son came of age.

Peter of Bar, lord of Pierrepont, and Theobald, lord of Pierrepont, also felt they had a claim to the regency. They attacked Yolande, who managed to get them to back down by forming alliances with Philip VI of France and Rudolph, Duke of Lorraine. Yolande's oldest son Edward was declared of age when he was ten, on the 10th of October 1349.

Edward died in 1352 and his brother Robert was proclaimed duke at only seven years old. Political problems associated with her continued position as regent had arisen. Yolande was on the point of remarrying to Philip of Navarre, count of Longueville, a member of the Navarre family which was attempting to claim the French crown from John the Good. Joan of Bar, Robert's grandaunt, made known to the king that she was ready to replace Yolande and assume the regency. The Parlement of Paris, by decree of 5 June 1352, declared that the county was under the king's control. John the Good then entrusted the regency to Joan on 27 July of that year. Yolande initially renounced the regency, but then went back on her decision, levying troops to fight Joan. John the Good intervened, to force Yolande to renounce the regency again on 2 July 1353.

The defeat of Poitiers and the capture of John the Good in 1356 deprived Joan of John's support and Yolande retook the regency. She ruled for another three years. Robert was knighted in December 1356 and declared of age on 8 November 1359.

Yolande died on 12 December 1395 at La Motte-aux-Bois Castle in Nieppe.

== Sources ==
- Bubenicek, Michelle (2002). Yolande de Flandre. Quand les femmes gouvernent. Droit et politique au XIVe siècle (in French). Ecole des Chartes.
- Neveu, Valérie (2004). "Michelle BUBENICEK, Quand les femmes gouvernent. Droit et politique au XIVe siècle : Yolande de Flandre, préf. de Michel Parisse, Paris, École des Chartes, 2002, 443 p. (Mémoires et documents de l'École des Chartes)". Clio. Femmes, Genre, Histoire (in French) (19): 246–248. doi:10.4000/clio.664. ISSN 1252-7017.
