= Skeyton =

Village in Norfolk, England

Coordinates: 52.78°N 1.32°E

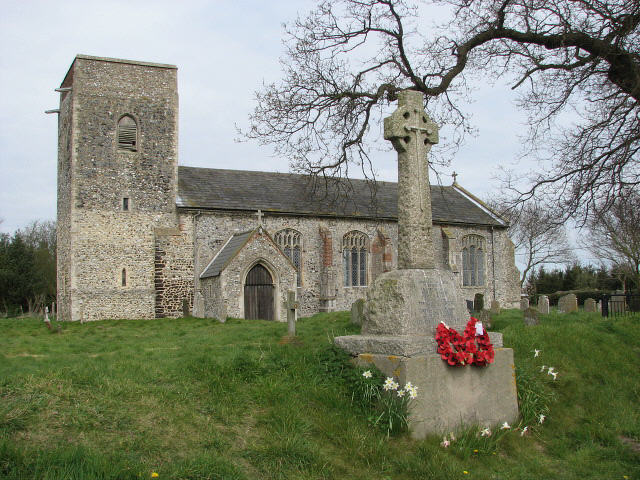
- All Saints’ Church, Skeyton

- Location within Norfolk
- Area: 5.28 km^{2} (2.04 sq mi)
- Population: 207 (parish, 2011 census)
  - Density: 39/km^{2} (100/sq mi)
- OS grid reference: TG2425
  - London: 129 miles (208 km)
- Civil parish: Skeyton
- District: North Norfolk
- Shire county: Norfolk
- Region: East
- Country: England
- Sovereign state: United Kingdom
- Post town: Norwich
- Postcode district: NR10
- Dialling code: 01692
- Police: Norfolk
- Fire: Norfolk
- Ambulance: East of England
- UK Parliament: North Norfolk

Skeyton is a small village and civil parish in the English county of Norfolk. The village and parish of Skeyton had in the 2001 census a population of 200, increasing slightly to 207 at the 2011 census. For the purposes of local government, the parish falls within the district of North Norfolk. Skeyton lies 4 miles (6.4 km) east of the market town of Aylsham, 13.5 miles (21.7 km) south of Cromer, 13.4 miles (21.6 km) north of Norwich and 129 miles (208 km) north-east of London. The nearest railway station is at North Walsham for the Bittern Line which runs between Sheringham, Cromer and Norwich. The nearest airport is Norwich International Airport.

== Correct pronunciation ==
"Skyt’n"; "Skytun"

== Description ==
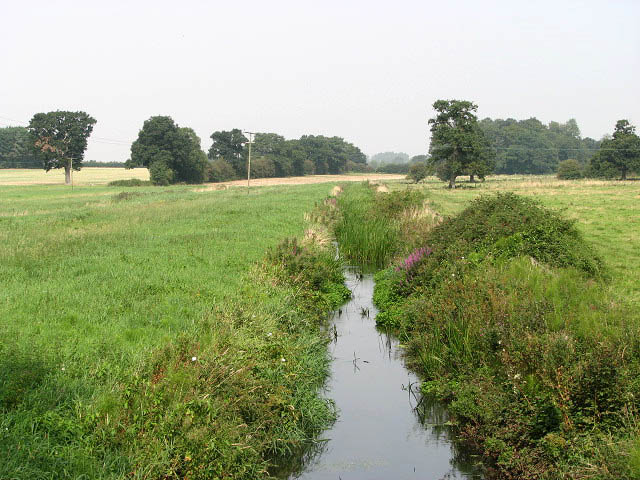
The Kings Beck, Skeyton

The parish of Skeyton is in the District of North Norfolk and covers an area of 528 hectares (1,300 acres). The western boundary of the parish runs along the course of two streams or becks, Skeyton Beck along the north-west boundary and Kings Beck to the south-west to the point where the beck joins the River Bure. The adjoining parishes along this western boundary are, north to south, Felmingham CP, Burgh and Tuttington CP and Buxton with Lammas CP. To the north the parish borders the southern edge of woodland called North Walsham Wood and Lord Anson's Wood, both of which are in the parish of North Walsham. The eastern boundary is with the parish of Swanton Abbott. The village derives its name from the Old English meaning Skeggi’s Farm. The name Skeggi is Norse in origin.

== History ==
There is little evidence to suggest evidence of settlement or activity in this parish until the medieval period. However, archaeological finds in the parish from before this period include small amounts of Bronze Age artifacts and Roman objects including an unusual figurine of the ancient Egyptian goddess Isis suckling the infant Horus, albeit badly corroded with several pieces missing. A scatter of metalwork objects from the Saxon period have been found in the parish, many of which are typical objects from this era. These include several brooches, a delicate silver belt loop and Late Saxon Thetford ware pottery shards. Most of this material has been uncovered in the vicinity of the church. Skeyton appears as Scegutuna in the Domesday Book of 1086, which describes it as being one league in length and half a league in breadth (measurements broadly consistent with those of the modern parish).

In the fourteenth century, Sir Edward de Warren, an illegitimate son of John de Warenne, 7th Earl of Surrey, was Lord of the Manor of Skeyton.

== The parish church of All Saints ==
The parish church of All Saints is situated on prominent upland surrounded by fields with just one dwelling nearby. The church dates from the 13th century although the south porch dates from the 14th century. The wooden door has a fine example of an iron door knocker. To the side of the porch one of the lancet windows has been blocked up. Most of the nave windows are 15th-century replacements. The church once had a north aisle, which was removed in the 15th century to widen the church, which accounts for the asymmetric position of the Church tower. The uncrenellated tower is a simple square design with carrstone quoins. Inside the church the 19th-century kingpost roof is visible, but older arched braces survive above the site of the rood screen. This was one of the first Norfolk churches to replace its box pews with benches, and these survive along with an elaborate font and cover dating to 1846. Also of note is the plaster-cast Royal Arms of Queen Victoria to commemorate Queen Victoria's Golden Jubilee in 1887, which are painted and gilt and survive in fine condition.
