= Edward I of Bar =

French nobleman (1294–1336)

Edward I, Count of Bar
- Died: November 1336; Famagusta
- Noble family: Montbéliard
- Spouse: Mary of Burgundy
- Issue: Henry IV; Beatrice; Eleanor
- Father: Henry III, Count of Bar
- Mother: Eleanor of England

Edward I (1294 – November 1336), was the Count of Bar from 1302 to his death. He was a minor when he succeeded his father Henry III as count, so ruled initially under the regency of his uncles, John of Puisaye, Theobald, Bishop of Liège, and Renaud, Bishop of Metz (his mother Eleanor had been dead since 1298).

== Life ==
Born in 1294, Edward was the son of Henry III, Count of Bar, and Eleanor of England. In 1308, he accompanied Frederick IV of Lorraine into battle. In 1310, he married Mary, daughter of Robert II, Duke of Burgundy and Agnes of France, and was declared to have attained his majority.

Edward purchased the Lordship of Stenay from his uncle John, the aforementioned Lord of Puisaye. In 1313, he was captured in battle against Frederick and not ransomed until 1314. Edward constructed a hydraulic forge at Moyeuvre-Grande in 1323. In 1324, he was again allied with the Duke of Lorraine, and also with John, King of Bohemia, and the Archbishop of Trier, Baldwin of Luxembourg. This operation was the War of Metz, for each of the allied lords was owed something by the citizens of Metz. Edward demanded compensation for garrisoning the city with his own troops during a conflict with the Bishop of Verdun.

In 1336, Edward died in a shipwreck off the coast of Famagusta, Cyprus, while en route to a Crusade.

== Marriage & issue ==
Edward and Marie had:

- Henry IV, his successor
- Eleanor (died 1332), married (1330) Rudolph, Duke of Lorraine, son of Frederick IV and Elisabeth of Austria, of the House of Habsburg
- Beatrice, married Guido Gonzaga, Lord of Mantua, member of the House of Gonzaga

== Sources ==
- Bubenicek, Michelle (2002). Quand les femmes gouvernent: droit et politique au XIVe siècle:Yolande de Flandre, Droit et politique au XIV siecle (in French). Ecole des Chartes.
- Jansen, Douglas C. (2000). "Eleanor of Castile (1241-1290". Women in World History. Vol. 5: Ead-Fur. Yorkin Publications. pp. 100–103.
- Poull, Georges (1994). La Maison souveraine et ducale de Bar (in French). Presses universitaires de Nancy.
