= Wakefield Castle =

Motte-and-bailey castle in West Yorkshire, England

- Thornes Park, Wakefield, West Yorkshire
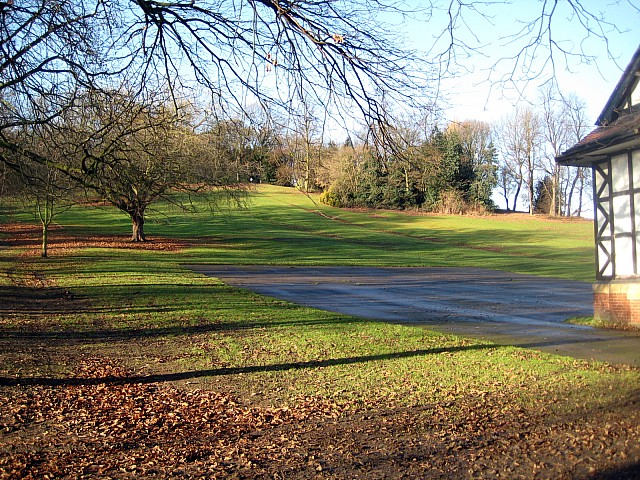
- Grass covered earthwork and tree covered motte at Lowe Hill

Site information
- Owner: City of Wakefield MDC
- Condition: motte

Location
- Coordinates: 53.672623°N 1.507191°W grid reference SE32651968

Wakefield Castle, Lowe Hill or Lawe Hill was a castle built in the 12th century on a hill on the north side of the River Calder near Wakefield, England. Its name derives from the Anglo Saxon hlaew meaning a mound or cairn, possibly a burial mound or barrow. The mound, situated a quarter mile from the river, was separated from the town by flat swampy land and was seen as a good site for a fortification.

== History ==
The remains of the motte and bailey castle are located in Thornes Park, in the centre of Wakefield overlooking the River Calder. It consists of the motte and two baileys. The motte is about nine metres high and 25 metres in diameter surrounded by a ditch that has been filled in. The inner bailey encloses the motte in a rough square of around forty metres across. There is a smaller outer bailey to the north-east. There has been little disturbance to the site since excavations in 1953 which indicated that the castle was probably an adulterine castle, built without permission, and abandoned unfinished. English Heritage granted permission for a geophysical (earth resistance) and topographical survey in 2015/16.

William de Warenne, 3rd Earl of Surrey probably started to build the castle, an earthwork motte and bailey structure during the Anarchy, the civil war between Stephen and Matilda. William had supported Stephen's claim. Wakefield Castle and neighbouring Sandal Castle were granted to Thomas, Earl of Lancaster in 1318 and in 1324 King Edward II committed them to the care of Richard Moseley. At what time the castle was destroyed is not known but a great gale in 1330 which caused much damage in Wakefield may have been the cause. This story was retold by the antiquarian, John Leland in his book, "The Itinerary of John Leland", a recollection of his travels around England between 1535 and 1543:

A quarter of a mile withowte Wakefeld apperith an hille of erth caste up, wher sum say that one of Erles Warines began to build, and as fast as he buildid violence of winde defacid the work. This is like a fable. Sum say that it was nothing W. R. but a wind mille hille. The place is now caullid Lohille.

The earliest records of the castle are from 1170 in a list of constables of the area. There are suggestions that the hill may have been built in Roman times and even that the layout of the site shows signs of being from Danish settlement.

In July 1558 a beacon was lit on Lowe Hill to warn the population that the Spanish Armada had been sighted off The Lizard in Cornwall.

== See also ==
- Sandal Castle
