= John de Warenne, 7th Earl of Surrey =

English nobleman (1286–1347)

John de Warenne
- 7th Earl of Surrey
- Predecessor: John de Warenne, 6th Earl of Surrey
- Successor: Richard Fitzalan, 3rd Earl of Arundel
- Born: 24/30 June 1286
- Baptised: 7 November 1286
- Died: June 1347 (aged 60 or 61)
- Noble family: Warenne
- Father: William de Warenne
- Mother: Joan de Vere

John de Warenne (24/30 June 1286 - June 1347), 7th Earl of Surrey, was the last Warenne Earl of Surrey.

== Life ==
John was born on either 24 or 30 June 1286 (Note: Some sources give his date of birth as 24 June 1286. This date was the feast of the Nativity of St. John the Baptist. – However, other sources give his date of birth as 30 June 1286.) and baptised on 7 November of that year.He was the son of William de Warenne, the only son of John de Warenne, 6th Earl of Surrey. His mother was Joan, daughter of Robert de Vere, 5th Earl of Oxford. Warenne was only six months old when his father died.

John was still a minor when his grandfather died in 1304. Because of this his lands were taken into the custody of the Crown at the time, and he was made a royal ward of his relative Edward I of England. He was given seisin of the lands of his inheritance from his grandfather, the late John de Warenne, 6th Earl of Surrey, in April 1306. On 6 June 1306, John was referred to as "the present earl of Surrey."

He was knighted on 22 May 1306 at Westminster Abbey along with 266 others, among which included the Prince of Wales, the future Edward II. This chivalric celebration was named the Feast of the Swans. From that time onwards he was much engaged in the Scottish wars.

John was one of the great nobles offended by the rise of Edward II's favorite Piers Gaveston, and helped secure Gaveston's 1308 banishment. The two were somewhat reconciled after Gaveston's return the next year, but in 1312 Warenne was one of the nobles who captured Gaveston. He was however unhappy about Gaveston's execution at the behest of the earl of Warwick, which pushed him back into the king's camp.

The baronial opposition was led by the king's cousin Thomas, Earl of Lancaster, and he and Warenne became bitter enemies. Private war erupted between the two, and over the next few years Warenne lost a good part of his estates to Lancaster. In 1319, the King granted the Earl of Lancaster the towns of Conisboro and Sandal, along with the manors of Wakefield, Thorne, Hatfield, Sowerby, Braithwell, Fishlake, Dewsbury, and Halifax with their appurtenances, which were held of the King in capite, and which John de Warenne had previously held under Royal Grant. On May 17, 1326, these Yorkshire estates were then re-granted to Warenne, after the forfeiture of the Earl of Lancaster's estate in 1322.

Warenne was one of the four earls who captured the two Roger Mortimers, the uncle and the nephew. In 1322 he was one of the nobles who condemned to death the Earl of Lancaster.

Warenne and his brother-in-law Edmund Fitzalan, 9th Earl of Arundel, were the last two earls to remain loyal to Edward II after the rise to power of Queen Isabella and Roger Mortimer. After Arundel's execution he went over to the queen's side, urging Edward II's abdication in 1327.

He was the guardian of his cousin Edward Balliol, and after Balliol lay claim to the Scottish throne, accompanied him on his campaign in Lothian. Balliol created Warenne earl of Strathern, but this was in name only for the properties of the earldom were held by the Scots.

Warenne died in 1347 at Conisbrough Castle. His burial took place at the Priory church of St Pancras, in Lewes. John gave instruction in his will that he wished to be buried in an arch at the church which he had prepared near the high altar. The date of his death recorded in his inquisition post mortems, ranges from 28 - 30 June 1347. He was succeeded as earl by his nephew Richard Fitzalan, who was also earl of Arundel.

== Family ==
On 15 March 1305, King Edward I of England offered John the marriage of his granddaughter Joan of Bar, Countess of Surrey, which he "willingly accepted." She was a daughter of count Henry III of Bar, and Eleanor of England, Countess of Bar, the eldest daughter of king Edward I of England.

John's father was a first cousin of Edward I of England which meant that himself and his bride to be were second cousins once removed. They were both descended from Isabella of Angoulême. A dispensation was granted from Pope Clement V in order for the marriage to take place, due to them being related within the fourth degree of kindred. They were married on 25 May 1306, in the royal chapel of Westminster Palace. Joan (or Jeanne) was only around 10 years old at the time of the marriage. After marriage, the couple lived in Yorkshire on John's estates. Sometimes they lived at Sandal Castle, while the rest of the time they lived at Conisbrough Castle. There were soon indicators that this marriage may not be a happy one, when in 1309 king Edward II of England granted leave for John to make any person he wished heir to the lands that he held. But he requested surety that any heir which he may have by his wife Joan was not to be disinherited. John and his wife did not have any children. He tried on several occasions to divorce Joan but was not successful.

Warenne had a relationship with Maud de Nerford, with whom he had several illegitimate children, one of whom included Sir Edward de Warren. He was living openly with Maud by 1311. In 1313 the King arranged for his yeoman William Aune to take Joan from Conisbrough Castle, and bring her to him. Edward II of England then paid all Joan's expenses while she lodged at the Tower of London.

On 8 March 1315 Maud was described as "Maud of Neyrford, daughter of the former William of Neyrford Knight, deceased, of the diocese of Norwich." (Note: Maud's father had died in 1302, and in his inquisition post mortem named Petronilla his wife, as heir. Maud's father William de Nerford (or Narford) was lord of the manor of Narford in Norfolk, and became a Knight by 1277. His wife Petronilla was a daughter of Sir John de Vaux. Petronilla divided her estate in the 16th year of the reign of Edward I, between herself and her sister Maud, then the wife of William de Roos or Roose. Petronilla's sister was assigned the lordships of Thirston and Shotesham, and a moiety of those of Holt, Cley juxta Mare, and Houghton by Walsingham, with many knights fees in Norfolk and Suffolk. Petronilla was lady of the manor of Narford in 1315. She died in 1326 and was buried at Pentney Priory, nearby to Narford. Maud de Nerford/ Narford's brothers were Sir John, Sir Thomas and Edmund. Edmund died in 1330 without issue.) This description occurred during a notice delivered by "Robert, called of the chapel of Jackesle, a clerk of the diocese of Lincoln," to Joan of Bar that she was cited to appear before Thomas Gerdeston, the Archdeacon of Norfolk or his commissary to answer in a case of matrimony and divorce between herself and John de Warenne. This case was brought by Maud herself. However, the notice was read out to Joan while she was in the crypt of Saint Stephen's in Westminster and attending to the queen, which was forbidden. And so Robert was sent to the Tower of London, and Thomas Gerdeston was ordered to appear at the next parliament. Maud had petitioned for the divorce of Warenne and his wife Joan on the basis that she had been precontracted to be married to John. This matter dragged on, and on 20 February 1316 the King allowed Maud's case to begin afresh. He granted Maud, and the Earl of Surrey, along with any other person that they may bring forward in their causes, protection pending the suits. John wished to be divorced from his wife Joan, and tried to bring the suit at the same time as Maud, because he claimed that at the time he agreed to marry her, he was unaware they were related. He also stated he was under age at the time he contracted to marry Joan and was forced into it. On 24 February 1316, the Earl and Maud were granted licence by the King for their suits to take place. There is no record of the hearing of the two cases. But no divorce was granted. In John's case this was probably due to the fact that it was forbidden under church law for a man to bring divorce proceedings based on consanguinity. Concerning Maud's case and her claims of a previous contract, no contract had been found. There were other obvious issues with the Earl's case: A dispensation had been obtained from the Pope at the time of marriage because John and Joan were related. At 19 years of age, John was above the age of consent to be married. And he is recorded as willingly accepting the marriage when it was proposed to him. By 1320 John had "expelled Maud de Nerforde from his heart and his company."

He later had a relationship with Isabella Holand, sister of Thomas Holland, later earl of Kent.

== Notes ==
Peerage of England
Preceded by John de Warenne	Earl of Surrey (1st creation); 1304–1347	Succeeded by Richard FitzAlan
