= Conisbrough Castle =

Medieval fortification in South Yorkshire, England

- Castle Hill, Conisbrough, Doncaster, England
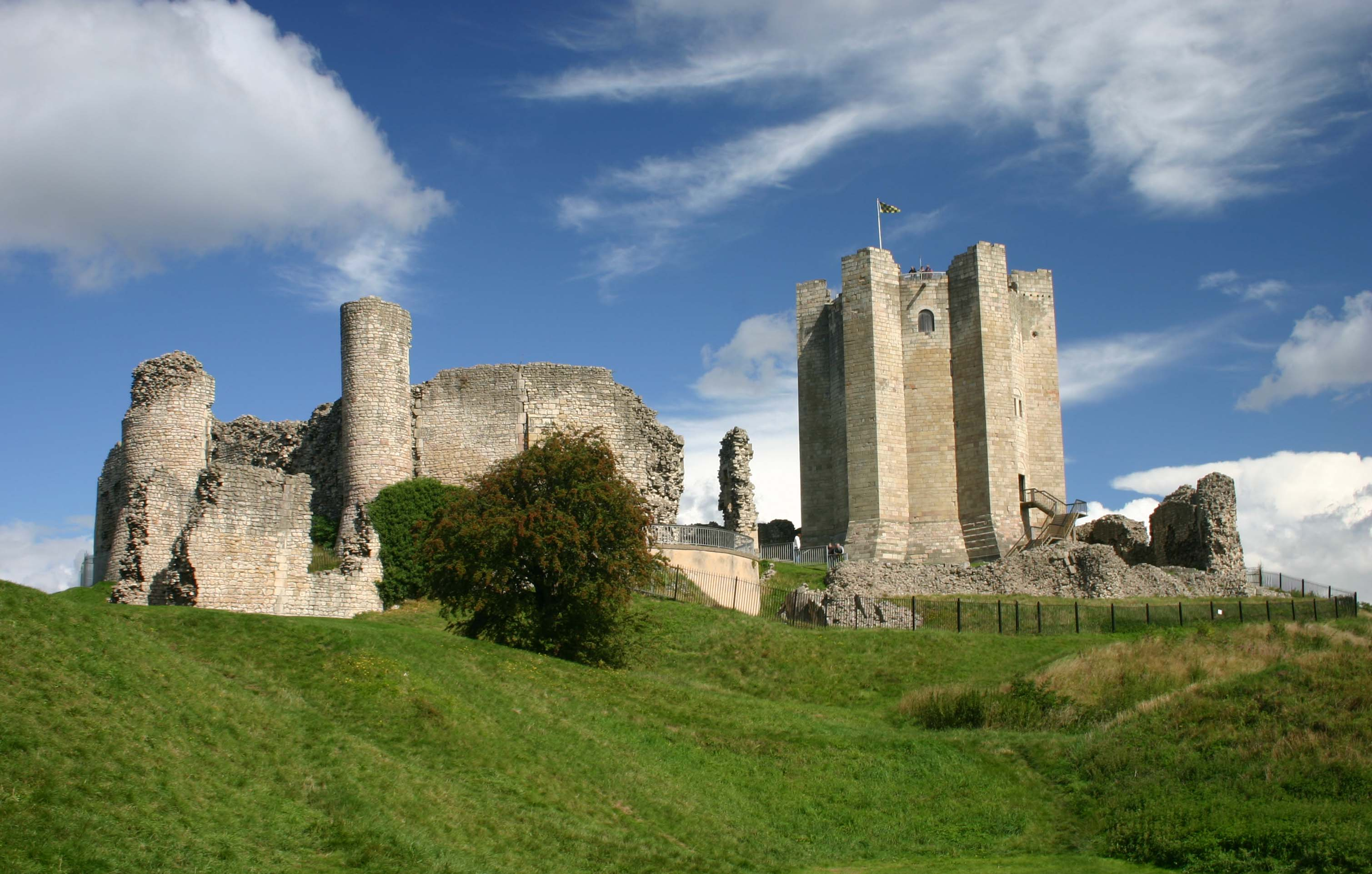
- The castle seen from the south-east

Site information
- Type: Castle
- Owner: Doncaster Metropolitan Borough Council and English Heritage
- Open to the public: Yes
- Condition: Ruined

Listed Building – Grade I
- Official name: Conisbrough Castle
- Designated: 26 November 1987
- Reference no.: 1192747

Location
- Shown within South Yorkshire
- Location within South Yorkshire
- Coordinates: 53°29′03″N 1°13′35″W
- Height: 62 feet (19 m)

Site history
- Built: 11th century
- Materials: Magnesian Limestone

Conisbrough Castle is a medieval fortification in Conisbrough, South Yorkshire, England. The castle was initially built in the 11th century by William de Warenne, the Earl of Surrey, after the Norman Conquest of England in 1066. Hamelin Plantagenet, the illegitimate, parvenu brother of Henry II, acquired the property by marriage in the late 12th century. Hamelin and his son William, Earl of Surrey rebuilt the castle in stone, including its prominent 28-metre (92 ft)-high keep. The castle remained in the family line into the 14th century, despite being seized several times by the Crown. The fortification was then given to Edmund of Langley, passing back into royal ownership in 1461.

Conisbrough Castle fell into ruin, its outer wall badly affected by subsidence, and was given to the Carey family in the 16th century. Its derelict state prevented it from involvement in the English Civil War of the 17th century and the remains were bought by the Duke of Leeds in 1737. Sir Walter Scott used the location for his 1819 novel Ivanhoe and by the end of the 19th century the ruins had become a tourist attraction.

The state took over the management of the property in 1950, but by the 1980s the visitor facilities were felt to be unsuitable, leading to a three-way partnership being created between the local council, the state agency English Heritage and a local charitable trust to develop the castle. The keep was re-roofed and re-floored in the 1990s with the help of European Union funding. English Heritage took over control of the castle in 2008 and continues to operate the property as a tourist attraction.

The castle is made up of an inner and an outer bailey, the former surrounded by a stone curtain wall defended by six mural or fortified towers and the castle keep. The inner bailey would have included a hall, solar, chapel and other service buildings of which only the foundations survive. The design of Conisbrough's keep is unique in England, and the historians Oliver Creighton and Stephen Johnson consider it an "architectural gem" and "one of the finest examples of late Norman defensive architecture". The keep comprises a circular central tower with six massive buttresses; its four floors would have included a main chamber and a private chamber for the lord above it. Although militarily weak, the design would have been a powerful symbol of Hamelin Plantagenet's new social status as a major lord.

== History ==
=== 11th – 12th centuries ===
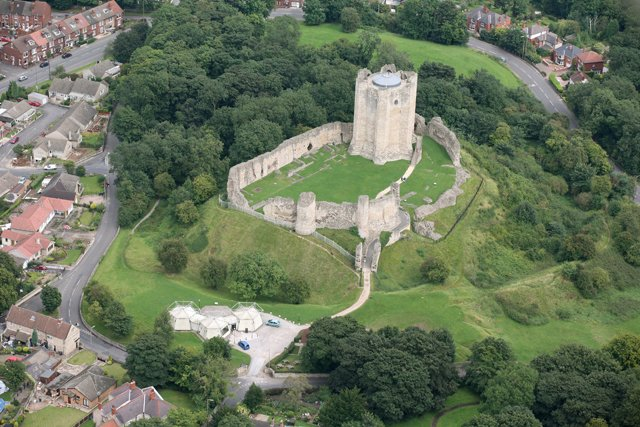
Aerial photograph in 2007, showing the outer and inner baileys (bottom left and top right)

Conisbrough Castle was founded by William de Warenne, the first Earl of Surrey, who had taken part in the Norman conquest of England in 1066 and was rewarded by his father-in-law, William the Conqueror, with extensive estates in Yorkshire, Norfolk and Sussex. As part of these, Lord de Warenne was given the manor of Conisbrough, which had previously been owned by the late Saxon king Harold II. The manor took its name from the Old English name for the settlement, Cyningesburh, meaning "the king's fortress", and formed a large estate comprising 28 townships, centred on a fortified burh at Conisbrough itself.

William built his castle on a rocky Magnesian Limestone spur surrounded by steep banks, and the fortification included a motte, an inner bailey protected by an earth bank and palisades, an outer bailey, and possibly a timber keep. The castle was located around 175 feet (53 m) above the river and would have dominated this part of the Don Valley. It was positioned directly opposite the village, which probably contained the old Anglo-Saxon burh.

The castle was held by William's son, also called William, from 1088 to 1138, and then by his son, another William, until his death in 1147. Conisbrough and the earldom then passed through Isabel, William's daughter, to her first husband, William de Blois, and then on to her second husband, Hamelin Plantagenet, whom she married in 1163. Hamelin was the illegitimate half-brother of King Henry II, who had arranged the marriage, and the union brought him great wealth. Hamelin extensively rebuilt the castle around 1180 to 1190, including constructing the stone keep; given his parvenu status, he probably hoped to reinforce perceptions of his new elevated rank. King John visited the castle in 1201.

=== 13th – 15th centuries ===
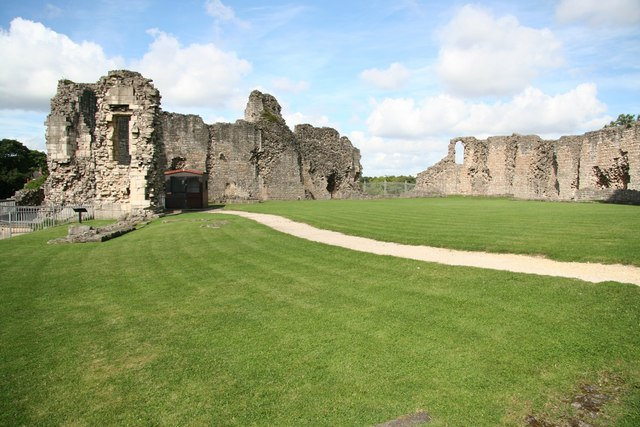
The inner bailey seen from the east, showing the former locations of the gatehouse and the solar block (left), and the castle's hall (right)

The castle continued in the ownership of Hamelin Plantagenet's family, passing to his son William de Warenne in 1202. William was probably responsible for the construction of new stone curtain walls around the inner bailey, destroying the former earthwork defences in the process. The inner bailey was levelled and William built a hall and service buildings inside the castle, again in stone. Conisbrough was inherited by William's young son John de Warenne in 1239, but he was still a minor and the castle was initially managed by his mother, Maud.

Under John, Conisbrough's constables carried out a range of what the historian Stephen Johnson terms "colourful if rather unlawful dealings"; one was ultimately charged with having conducted "devilish and innumerable oppressions". Further work was carried out in the castle during John's ownership, including modernising the castle hall and solar.

The castle passed to John's grandson, also called John, who, in 1304, married Joan de Barr. The marriage broke down but John's attempts to gain a divorce in 1316 failed in the law courts. John blamed Thomas, the Earl of Lancaster, for this and in response he kidnapped Thomas' wife; Thomas then retaliated by seizing Conisbrough Castle. Edward II intervened in the dispute and confirmed Thomas as the new owner of the castle. In 1322, however, Thomas rebelled against the King and was executed, resulting in Edward taking control of Conisbrough himself. The King visited the castle in 1322, and spent 40 marks on repairing both Conisbrough and the neighbouring castle of Pontefract. (Note: The medieval mark was worth two-thirds of an English pound; 400 marks was the equivalent of £266. It is impossible to accurately compare medieval financial sums with their modern equivalents; as a comparative example, an average English baron of the period had an annual income of around £200.) Edward was overthrown by his wife Isabella in 1326 and the castle was returned to John. John had hoped to pass the property to his mistress and two illegitimate sons, but he outlived them and on his death in 1347 it reverted to the control of the Crown.

Edward III gave the castle to his own son, Edmund of Langley, the Duke of York, who controlled it until 1402. Edmund's eldest son, Edward, owned it until 1415, when it passed to Maud Clifford, the widow of Edmund's younger son Richard, who lived there until 1446. Richard of York then inherited the castle, and on his death in 1460 during the Wars of the Roses it passed to his son Edward, who seized the throne in 1461, bringing Conisbrough back into Crown ownership once again.

=== 16th – 19th centuries ===
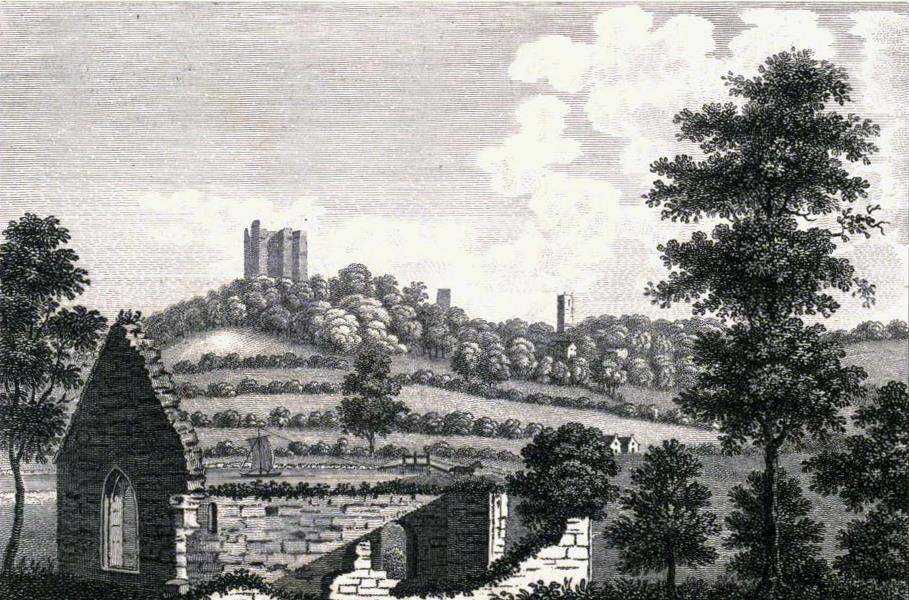
Engraving of the castle from afar in 1785

By the 16th century Conisbrough Castle was in a poor state of repair, and a royal survey carried out in 1537 and 1538 showed that the gates, bridge and parts of the walls had collapsed in a spectacular land slippage, and that one floor of the keep had also fallen in. The collapse of the walls was a consequence of the instability of the topsoil on top of the limestone spur, which was a mixture of clay and sandstone; once the clay was washed away over time, the remaining sandstone proved extremely unstable and liable to crack.

Henry VIII gave the ruins to the Carey family, who retained it until it passed by marriage into first the Heviningham and then the Coke families. The castle was not involved in the events of the English Civil War in the 17th century, and escaped the slighting that affected many similar properties, probably because the collapse of the outer walls had already made it indefensible and of little military value. In 1737, after the death of Edward Coke, the castle and the surrounding manor were bought by Thomas Osborne, the Duke of Leeds, for £22,500. (Note: It is challenging to accurately compare 18th-century and modern financial sums. £22,500 in 1737 would be worth between £3.1 million and £364 million in 2013 terms, depending on the financial measure used.)

In 1811 the novelist Sir Walter Scott passed by the castle and later used it as the location for his novel Ivanhoe, published in 1819. Scott only had a partial view of the property from the road and the events portrayed in the novel, set at the end of the 12th century, are fictitious; Scott believed the castle to have been Saxon in origin, a view shared by many 19th-century commentators. Although the writer John Wainwright was still able to praise the "picturesque view" around the castle in 1826, the antiquarian Ecroyd Smith commented with concern in 1887 on the changing character of the location, in particular the factories that were growing up around the new railway line and the "murky atmosphere" the industrial works created.

In 1859 Francis D'Arcy-Osborne, the Duke of Leeds, died, leaving Conisbrough to his nephew, Sackville Lane-Fox, the Baron Conyers. The keep remained in good condition, but by 1884 it was apparent that repairs were needed and the antiquarian George Clark recommended urgent work to repair the stonework. If finances allowed it, he also urged the reinstallation of a roof and wooden floors. Limited repairs were subsequently approved by the trustees of Lord Conyers, although Clark's colleague, A. Ellis, expressed concerns that railings to protect the visitors who routinely climbed to the top of the keep had not been funded. A reported £500 was spent by the trustees renovating the castle ruins, including the construction of a lodge in the outer bailey for the castle keeper, completed in 1885, and improvements to the footpaths. (Note: Comparing 19th-century and modern financial sums depends on the financial measure used. £500 in 1885 would be worth between £47,000 and £651,000 in 2013 terms, depending on the financial measure used.)

=== 20th – 21st centuries ===
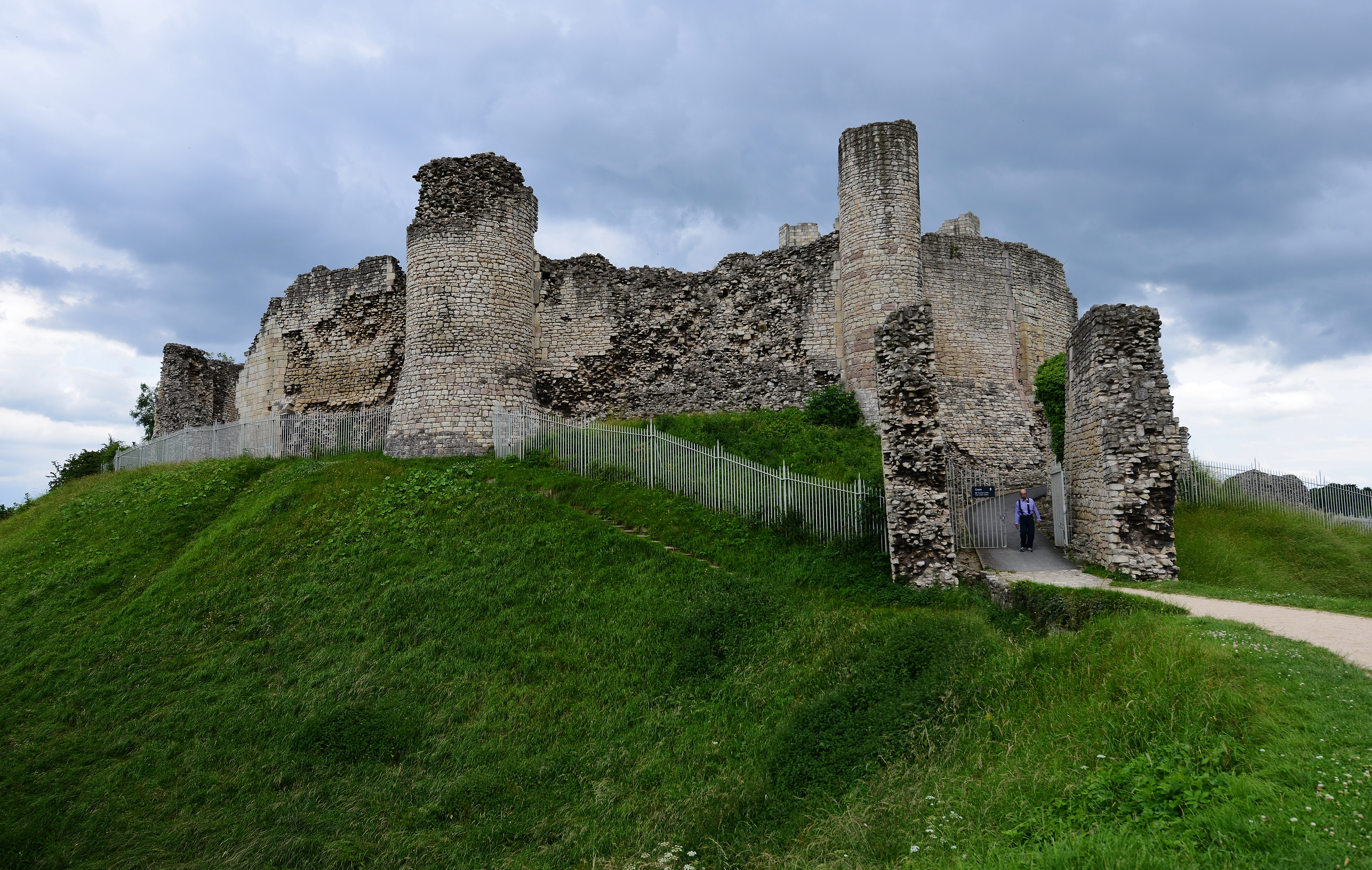
The inner bailey seen from the outer bailey, showing the remains of the barbican (the protruding gateway at right) and the mural towers (built into the walls)

Conisbrough Castle was bought by the Conisbrough local council in the 1940s, who placed the castle into the guardianship of the Ministry of Public Works in 1949, but retained the freehold ownership of the land. Two sets of archaeological excavations were carried out on the site between 1967 and 1969, exposing the foundations of the buildings in the inner bailey, and then from 1973 to 1977, examining options for future visitor facilities. By 1984, when the government agency English Heritage took over the management of the property, the condition of the visitor services was unsatisfactory and the industrial character of the surrounding area was discouraging tourists.

In response, English Heritage and Doncaster Metropolitan Borough Council formed a three-way agreement in 1988 with the Ivanhoe Trust, a local charity designed to generate new employment in the region. Under this agreement the trust would manage the site, English Heritage would maintain the historic fabric of the castle, while the council would construct a new visitors' centre. A new, controversial visitor's centre was built in the style of a collection of jousting tents, while the floors and roof of the keep were reinstalled between 1993 and 1995 with European Union funding, in an attempt to limit the erosion of the castle stonework.

Visitor numbers following the investments fell far short of expectations, however, and by 2006 had settled at around 30,000 each year, only slightly above the level in the early 1980s. The external facilities did not age well and funding shortages led to the new audio-visual effects in the keep being turned off to save money. Discussions between the three partners about the future of the castle took place, but relations broke down and English Heritage resumed the direct management of the castle in 2008.

The castle was closed for a £1.1 million programme of renovations in 2013, funded by the Heritage Lottery Fund, as part of which a new visitors' centre and visitor facilities were constructed. The castle is protected under UK law as a Grade I listed building and as a Scheduled Ancient Monument.

== Architecture ==
=== Inner and outer baileys ===
Plan of the inner bailey of the castle in the early 13th century. Key: A – solar block; B – hall; C – kitchen and pantry; D – keep and stairs; E – barbican and gatehouse; F – chapel. Grey indicates splayed footings

Conisbrough Castle has an outer and an inner bailey, approximately 260 by 120 feet (79 by 37 m) and 290 by 205 feet (88 by 62 m) across respectively. The castle was entered through the outer bailey, a rectangular enclosure protected by earthworks, which would have contained the castle's barns, stables, and other service facilities. A drawbridge on the northern side of the outer bailey, now replaced by an earth causeway, linked it with the inner bailey.

The oval inner bailey was formed by scarping and counter-scarping the natural contours of the hill, producing a bank, now largely destroyed, and a protective ditch. The early 13th-century curtain wall is mostly of roughly dressed, coursed stone, up to 7 feet (2.1 m) thick and 35 feet (11 m) high, with two sections repaired with ashlar facings. The wall was defended by six mural towers along its southern and western sides, of which three still survive reasonably intact, and strengthened with pilaster buttresses along the northern edge. The bases of the walls and the towers were splayed, spreading their weight out more broadly, but their footings are only 0.6 metres (2 ft 0 in) deep in places. A barbican protected the link from the drawbridge to the gatehouse of the inner bailey, complete with an additional corner turret. The remains of the collapse of the curtain wall are still visible in the ditch.

Various buildings were constructed along the inside of the inner bailey wall of similar rough stonework to the curtain wall, but only their foundations remain today. In the south-west corner was the solar block, containing the solar and various chambers. Along the north side was the hall, pushed into an awkward corner of the curtain wall, 70 by 30 feet (21.3 by 9.1 m) in size and originally probably built two storeys high. Initially constructed with a central hearth, a fireplace was added into the outer wall in the later 13th century. Alongside the hall were a kitchen and pantry, the former with a cellar. On the south-east side of the inner bailey was the castle chapel, 20 by 40 feet (6.1 by 12.2 m) across.

=== Keep ===
Conisbrough's keep was positioned on the north-east side of the inner bailey. It is an important medieval survival: the historian, Sidney Toy, considered it to be "one of the finest keeps in England", the archaeologist Oliver Creighton describes it as an "architectural gem" and Stephen Johnson as "one of the finest examples of late Norman defensive architecture".

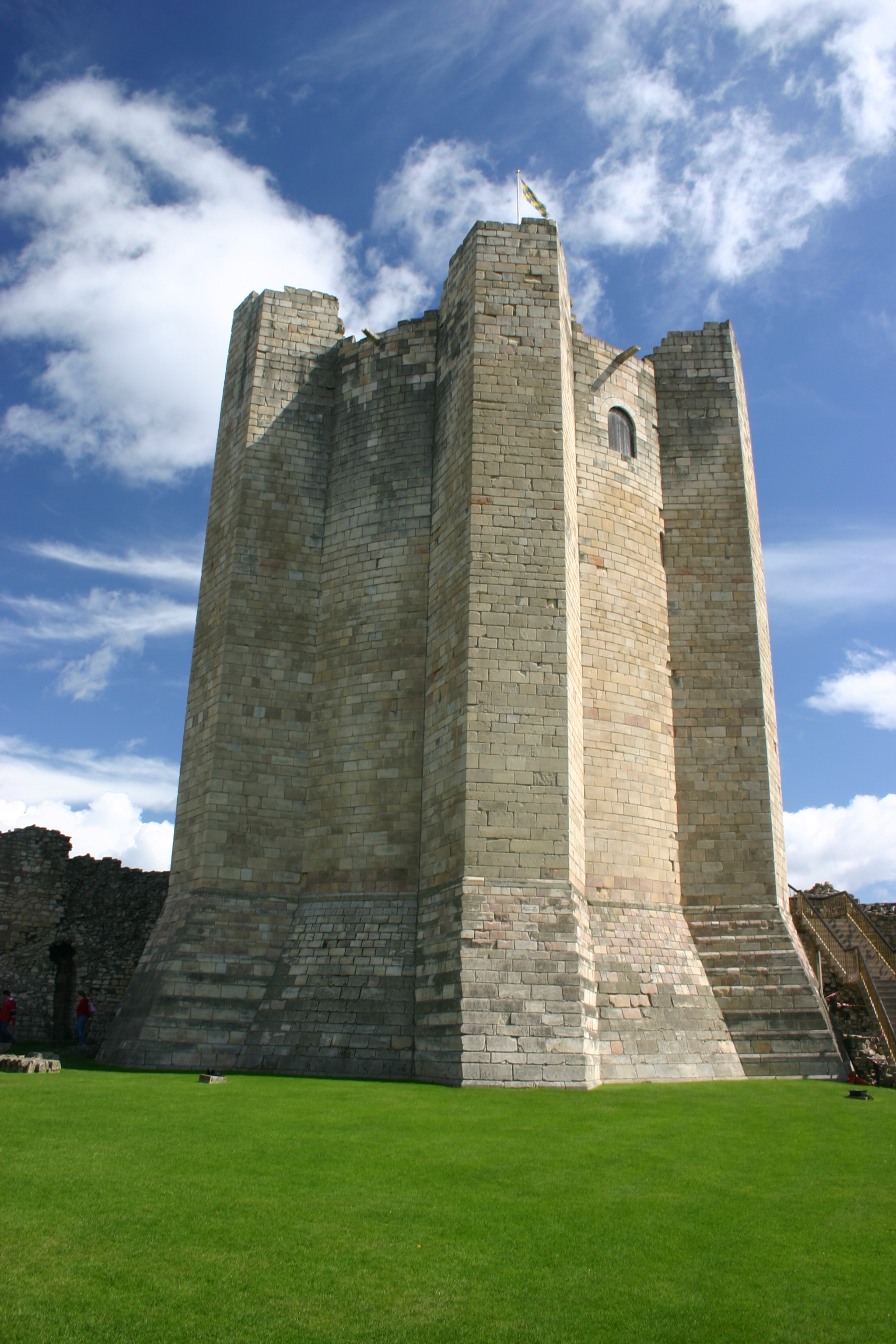
The keep, re-roofed and floored between 1993 and 1995

The keep comprises a central circular tower, 62 feet (19 m) in diameter, with six, large solid buttresses projecting outwards to form an hexagonal design, unique in England. It was made from magnesian limestone and 28 metres (92 ft) tall with walls up to 15 feet (4.6 m) thick in places. It has four floors: a ground floor that serves as a basement and a vaulted stone support for the chamber above; the first floor, through which the keep was accessed; two upper floors and a roof walk, which was probably covered by a pentice and defended by battlements.

The current concrete stairs to the keep are modern, and the original medieval stairway, made from timber and stone, would have incorporated a drawbridge just before the castle doors. The basement contained a well, which could also be drawn from the 1st floor through a hole in the stone floor.

The keep was designed as a private tower for Hamelin Plantagenet, rather than a grander residence. As a result, it was not designed to accommodate several different households and its layout was simpler than that seen at the contemporary keep of Orford Castle, for example. The 2nd and the 3rd floor would have served as the main chamber and the lord's private chamber, forming a vertical sequence of rooms, with a vaulted, hexagonal chapel leading off the private chamber, cut into one of the buttresses.

Most of the castle would have been very dark due to the lack of natural light. The main chamber, however, had a large window, 1 foot 10 inches (0.56 m) by 4 feet 8 inches (1.42 m), with deep recesses to allow for the thickness of the walls; two carved seats sat alongside the window. A similar window was placed above it in the private chamber. The keep had relatively advanced fireplaces and flues for this period, the fireplace in the main chamber being exceptionally large and decorated with stone columns and carved capitals.

Conisbrough Castle was probably similar to two other castles owned by the Warren earls. Hamelin Plantagenet was also responsible for the development of Mortemer Castle in France, where a similar keep was built on top of a motte, and Conisbrough might also have had resemblances to Sandal Castle in the north of England, also owned by the earls. The design of the keep was poor from a military perspective. The central circular tower provided defensive advantages but the buttresses introduced 12 vulnerable corners into the stonework, and the keep itself had no arrow slots to permit the defenders to fire on any attackers. Rather than being designed primarily for military defence, it was constructed to symbolise and reinforce Hamelin's lordship and new social status.

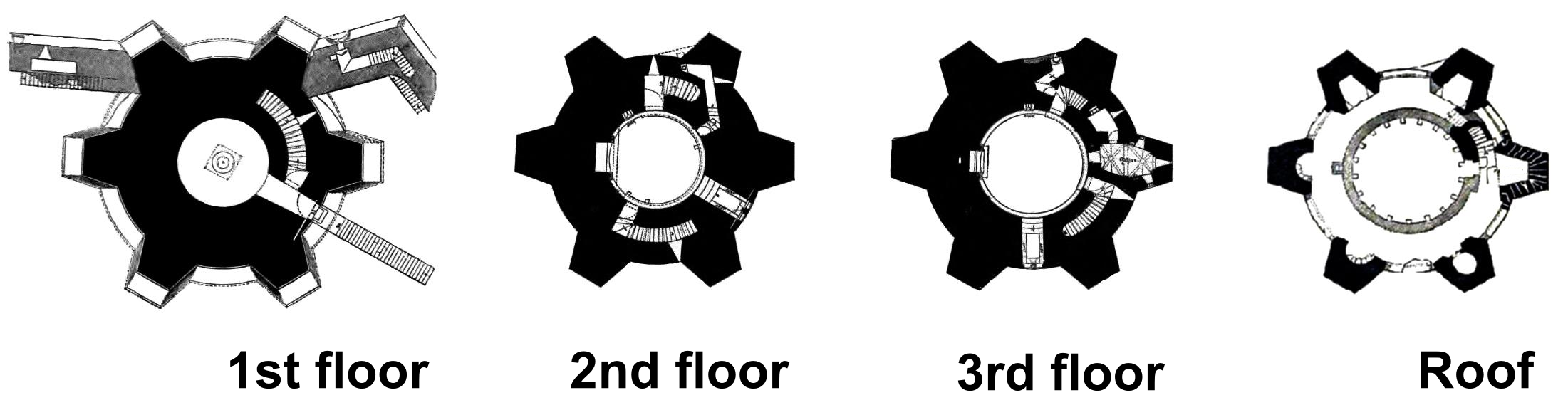
Plan of the Conisbrough Castle's keep

== See also ==
- Castles in Great Britain and Ireland
- List of castles in England
- Grade I listed buildings in South Yorkshire
- Listed buildings in Conisbrough and Denaby

== Bibliography ==
- Clark, George T. (1884a). Mediaeval Military Architecture in England. Vol. 1. London, UK: Wyman and sons.
- Clark, George T. (1884b). "Conisborough Castle". The Yorkshire Archaeological Journal. 8: 124–157.
- Creighton, O. H. (2005). Castles and Landscapes: Power, Community and Fortification in Medieval England. London, UK: Equinox. ISBN 978-1-904768-67-8.
- Davis, Philip (2012). "English Heritage Plans for Conisbrough Castle, Yorkshire" (PDF). Castle Studies Group Bulletin. 14: 5–6.
- Davis, Philip (2014). "Shining Light Onto Conisbrough Castle" (PDF). Castle Studies Group Bulletin. 18: 11–12.
- Dixon, William H., ed. (1887). "Fine-Art Gossip". Athenaeum: Journal of Literature, Science, the Fine Arts, Music, and the Drama (3119).
- Dixon, Philip (2008). "The Influence of the White Tower on the Great Towers of the Twelfth Century". In Impey, Edward (ed.). The White Tower. New Haven, US and London, UK: Yale University Press. pp. 243–276. ISBN 978-0-300-11293-1.
- Ellis, A. S. (1885). "Conisborough Castle". The Yorkshire Archaeological Journal. 9: 399–400.
- Hull, Lise (2008). Great Castles of Britain and Ireland. London, UK: New Holland Publishers. ISBN 978-1-84773-130-2.
- Johnson, Stephen (1980). "Excavations at Conisbrough Castle, 1973–1977". The Yorkshire Archaeological Journal. 52: 59–88.
- Johnson, Stephen (1984). Conisbrough Castle, South Yorkshire. Edinburgh, UK: Her Majesty's Stationery Office. ISBN 0-11-671485-9.
- Liddiard, Robert (2005). Castles in Context: Power, Symbolism and Landscape, 1066 to 1500. Bollington, UK: Windgather Press. ISBN 0-9545575-2-2.
- Pounds, Norman John Greville (1994). The Medieval Castle in England and Wales: A Social and Political History. Cambridge, UK: Cambridge University Press. ISBN 978-0-521-45828-3.
- Scott, Walter (1998). Tulloch, Graham (ed.). Ivanhoe. Edinburgh, UK: University of Edinburgh Press. ISBN 0-7486-0573-8.
- Smith, Henry Ecroyd (1887). The History of Conisborough Castle, With Glimpses of Ivanhoe-Land. Worksop, UK: Robert White.
- Thompson, M. W. (1969). "Further work at Conisbrough Castle, Yorkshire". Medieval Archaeology. 13: 215–216.
- Toy, Sidney (1985) [1939]. Castles: Their Construction and History. New York, US: Dover. ISBN 978-1-904768-67-8.
