= Sandal Castle =

Medieval castle in England

- Sandal Magna, Wakefield, West Yorkshire
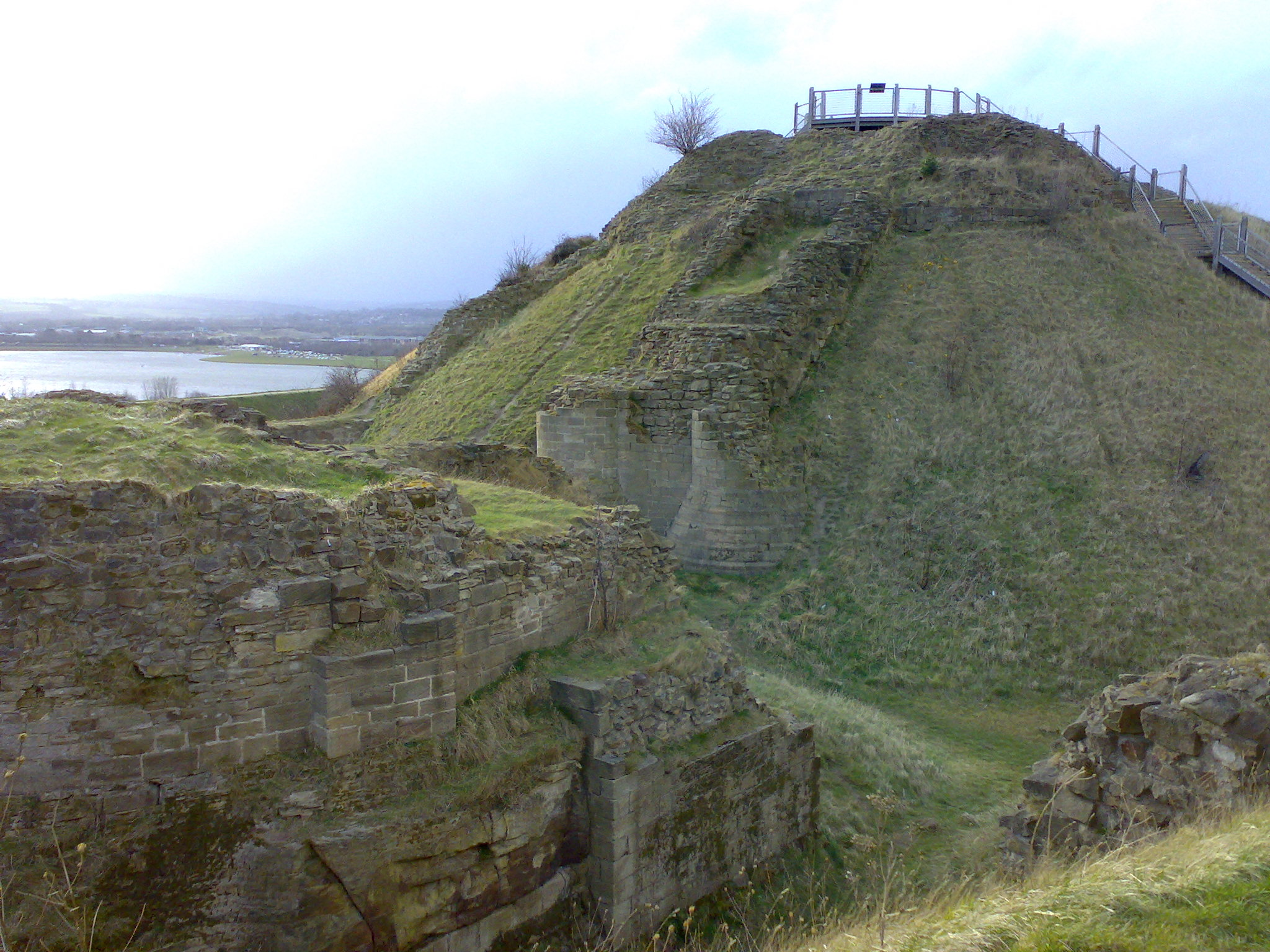
- A view of the motte and barbican at Sandal Castle

Site information
- Owner: Wakefield Metropolitan District Council
- Condition: Substantial motte and ruined stonework

Location
- Coordinates: 53°39′32″N 1°29′28″W grid reference SE3318

Site history
- Materials: Sandstone

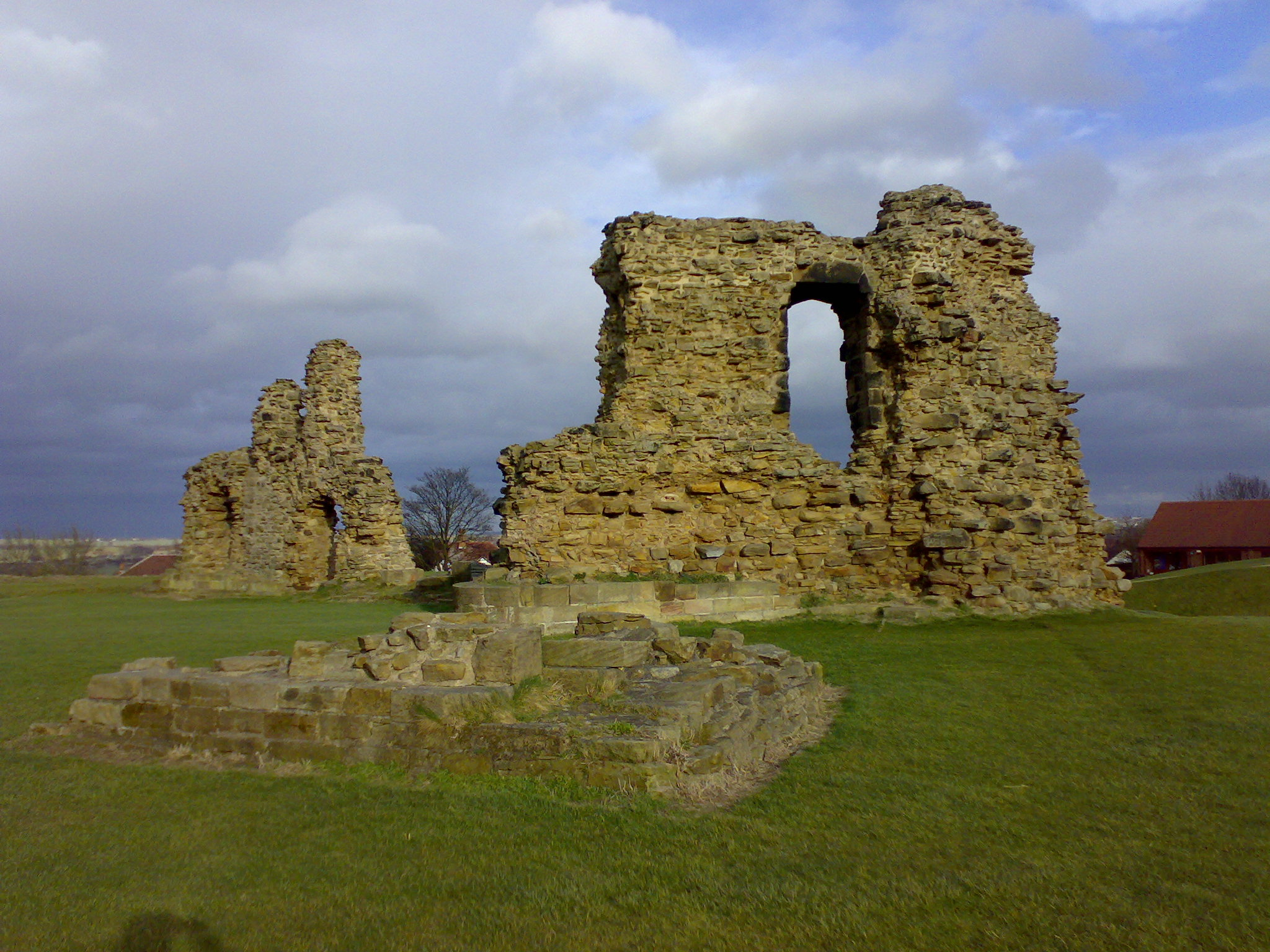
A view of the remaining wall at Sandal Castle.

Sandal Castle is a ruined medieval castle in Sandal Magna, a suburb of the city of Wakefield in West Yorkshire, England, overlooking the River Calder. It was the site of royal intrigue and the setting for a scene in one of William Shakespeare's plays.

== History ==
=== The Warennes ===
William de Warenne, 2nd Earl of Surrey (1081–1138) was granted the Sandal estates in 1107. The 2nd earl built the first Sandal Castle of timber. He supported Robert Curthose against Henry I of England and was banished from the kingdom for two years. Later he was given the Wakefield manor. William de Warenne, 3rd Earl of Surrey (1119–1148) spent little time at Sandal, having taken crusading vows and joined the Second Crusade. He had one daughter, Isabel de Warenne (1137–1199), who married William of Blois, son of King Stephen, who became the 4th earl. He died in 1159, leaving no children. Isabel, his widow, next married Hamelin (1129–1202), the 5th earl. He was the son of Geoffrey of Anjou and assumed the Warrene name on his marriage in 1164. Hamelin is thought to have built the early Norman stone fortifications at Conisbrough Castle and also begun to replace the wooden fortifications at Sandal with stone.

William de Warenne, 5th Earl of Surrey (1166–1240) married Maud Marshal in 1225. He was loyal to his cousin, King John and is one of the four nobles whose name appears in the Magna Carta for John. On King John's death in 1216 he supported Henry III. Maud de Warenne, William's widow, held the Wakefield Manor from 1240 until their son John de Warenne, 6th Earl of Surrey (1231–1304) came of age in 1252. John married Alice de Lusignan in 1247. In 1296 the 6th Earl was appointed warden for Scotland by Edward I and in 1299, the Earl and his royal master were triumphant over the Scots at the Battle of Falkirk.

William de Warrene (1256–1286) was killed at a tournament in Croydon pre-deceasing his father. His son John de Warenne, 7th Earl of Surrey (1286–1347) was born in the year of his death. John married Joan of Bar but lived adulterously with Maud de Nereford from a village near Castle Acre in Norfolk. In 1347, the 7th Earl died. His sons John and Thomas became Knights Hospitaller in the Holy Land, predeceasing their mother. The lands passed to Edward III.

The Warennes had castles at Lewes in Sussex and Reigate in Surrey, Castle Acre Castle in Norfolk and Conisbrough in Yorkshire.

=== The Dukes of York ===
In 1347, Edward III granted Sandal to his fifth son Edmund of Langley who was six years old at the time. His elder brother John of Gaunt held Pontefract and Knaresborough Castles, Edmund was granted Wark Castle near Coldstream in the Scottish Borders, and in 1377 Fotheringhay Castle in Northamptonshire which was to become his home, and for the next 75 years the family seems to have spent little time at Sandal, leaving it to the management of constables or stewards.

In 1385 Edmund was made Duke of York as a reward for his support for his nephew, Richard II of England. He was succeeded by his son, also Edward who campaigned in Ireland and died at the Battle of Agincourt in 1415. Edward was succeeded by his nephew, Richard Plantagenet, 3rd Duke of York.

=== The Battle of Wakefield ===
Early in 1460, during the Wars of the Roses, Richard Plantagenet made a bid for the throne. He was initially not well-received, but an Act of Accord made in October 1460 recognised him as heir to the throne and named him Protector of the Realm. In December Richard went to Sandal Castle, either to consolidate his position or to counter Lancastrian dissent. He had an army of 3,000–8,000 men but on 30 December in the Battle of Wakefield, he was outnumbered and outmaneuvered by Queen Margaret's army, coming from nearby Pontefract. Richard suffered a crushing defeat and both he and his younger son Edmund, Earl of Rutland were killed (although only two months later Richard's eldest son Edward became king).

=== Richard III ===
The castle's last brush with royalty came in 1483 when Richard's eighth son (and twelfth child) Richard III chose it as a northern base and ordered significant investments. This hope was short lived however as Richard was killed in the Battle of Bosworth in 1485. After this the castle was maintained a little, but gradually declined, with the building of Wakefield Prison in the 1590s leaving it even less useful.

=== The English Civil War ===
During the English Civil War Sandal Castle was Royalist, although its neglected state left it out of the major conflicts. In 1645 however it was besieged at least three times by Parliamentarian troops. Butler recounts: Having been assured that they would receive a safe passage to Welbeck House in north Nottinghamshire they surrendered the castle at 10 o'clock on 1 October 1645. The garrison was then 10 officers and 90 men with two of the men called "seniors" implying that they were professional soldiers rather than just non-commissioned officers. They also surrendered 100 muskets, 50 pikes, 20 halberds, 150 swords and two barrels of gunpowder: no pieces of artillery are mentioned.

As a result of this capitulation, only Bolton Castle in Wensleydale and Skipton Castle remained in Royalist hands in Yorkshire, but Sandal "was the most resolute of all the three northern garrisons" and its fall caused great rejoicing among the parliamentarian forces. By the siege's end, it was a ruin. The following year, Parliament ordered that it be made untenable.

== The castle ==
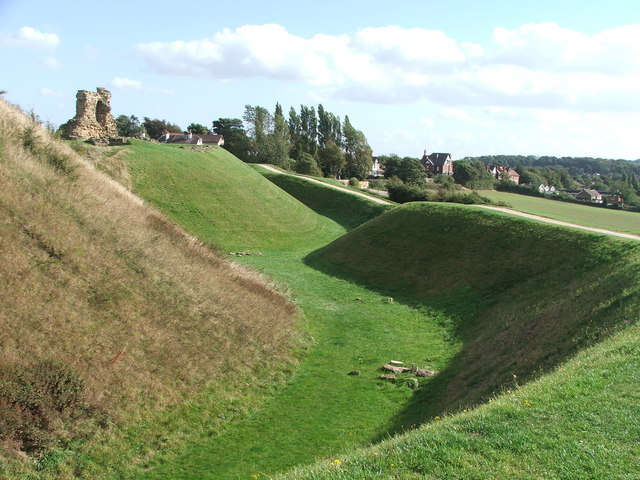
The motte at Sandal Castle

The castles built by William the Conqueror's followers were self-sufficient strongholds, some of which were tax-gathering points, some controlled the larger towns, river crossings or passes through hills. Two castles were built near Wakefield, one at Lowe Hill on the north bank of the Calder and Sandal on the south bank. The first castles were probably started and completed in the early 12th century by William de Warenne, 2nd Earl of Surrey after he had been granted the manor of Wakefield by Henry I.

Sandal and Lowe Hill were motte-and-bailey earthwork castles with wooden towers on the mound and baileys with timber palisades and deep ditches. Sandal is built on a natural sandstone ridge, the Oaks Rock. The motte was raised to 10 metres (33 ft) with the 7 metres (23 ft) deep moat surrounding it. Only Sandal survived and during the 13th century the keep, curtain wall and other buildings were rebuilt in stone, probably started by either the sixth or seventh Earls Warenne. Timber motte and bailey castles were often converted into stone if they were in use for long periods; Sandal is a particularly good example of this.

The stone keep was circular with four towers each four storeys high; two of them close together formed a gatehouse, and the east tower contained a well, 37 metres (121 ft) deep. The double-walled keep would have had guardrooms, storerooms and servants' quarters on the ground floor, the main hall above and private apartments on the second floor. The tower rooms had garderobes, (lavatories) that discharged on the outer walls of the keep. The curtain wall was 6 metres (20 ft) high with a wall walk along its length, it enclosed the bailey and crossed the moat twice to reach the keep.

The barbican at Sandal was inside the bailey; it was a three-storey tower with a moat opposite two drum towers at the entrance to the keep, all of which were constructed in the early 1270s. The barbican with its own gate and portcullis added an extra line of defence between the main entrance gate and the keep. Attackers entering the barbican had to make a right-angled turn to enter the keep, which was protected by a drawbridge between the drum towers. A stairway from the barbican led to a sally port.

The bailey lay to the south-east of the keep with the main gatehouse on the north-east side. It was crescent shaped, about 71 metres (233 ft) long and 52 metres (171 ft) wide. Inside the bailey there was a 12 metres (39 ft) deep well and two privy shafts, one of which is 8 metres (26 ft) deep.

== The ruins ==
The ruins were a source of stone for local building and became a place for locals to relax. They were depicted in the foreground of a drawing of Wakefield from the south by Samuel Buck in 1719 or 1722, and in 1753 an engraving was published of an Elizabethan survey drawing.

The ruins were first excavated by the Yorkshire Archaeological Society in 1893. A more detailed project began in the summer of 1964 and was a partnership between Wakefield Corporation, Wakefield Historical Society and the University of Leeds. This project started as an experiment in adult education, but with the help of over a hundred local volunteers it grew into a complete and rigorous excavation that continued for nine years. Whilst excavating the bailey, archaeologists found remains of flint tools suggesting a Mesolithic encampment was there in about 5,000 BC.

In 2003, a wooden walkway was provided to allow access to the summit of the motte without causing erosion. A visitor centre was constructed about 110 yards (100 m) from the castle. There have been historical re-enactments and "living history" days, including commemoration of the Battle of Wakefield and the deaths of Richard Duke of York and his son Edmund. In February 2015 Wakefield Council announced that due to budget constraints they were considering plans to either close the visitor centre or reduce its opening hours.

The castle is a Scheduled Monument, which means it is a "nationally important" historic building and archaeological site which has been given protection against unauthorised change. It is also a Grade II* listed building.

== Literary and folk references ==
Shakespeare's play Henry VI, Part 3 (Act 1, Scene 2) is set in Sandal Castle. It describes Richard's sons urging him to take the crown before news is brought of Margaret's approach. Act 1, scene 4 then depicts the death of Richard at the Queen's hands. This brief fictionalised account bears little resemblance to the history as we understand it today. The play is sometimes performed on the castle ruins.

Local folklore holds that the nursery rhyme Grand Old Duke of York was written about the castle, with the titular Duke referring to Richard III. The song is said to refer to either the frequent movement of soldiers to and from the castle, where the Duke had his treasury, or to the movement of soldiers just prior to the Battle of Wakefield.

== Castle occupants ==
Among the notable individuals who lived in the castle were William de Warrene, the Second Earl of Surrey; Elizabeth of Vermandois; William de Warrene, the Third Earl of Surrey, who was also a Knight Crusader; Isabel de Warrene, the Fourth Countess of Surrey; Hamelin Plantagenet (also known as Hamelin de Warrene), the Fifth Earl of Surrey; John de Warrene,, the Seventh Earl of Surrey; Joan of Bar; Edmund of Langley, the First Duke of York; Edward of Norwich, the Second Duke of York; and Richard of York, the Third Duke of York.

== See also ==
- Castles in Great Britain and Ireland
- List of castles in England
- Grade II* listed buildings in West Yorkshire
- Listed buildings in Wakefield
