= Henry IV of Bar =

Henry IV, Count of Bar
- Born: between 1315 and 1320
- Died: 1344
- Noble family: House of Montbéliard
- Spouse: Yolande of Flanders, Countess of Bar
- Issue: Edward II of Bar; Robert I of Bar
- Father: Edward I of Bar
- Mother: Marie of Burgundy

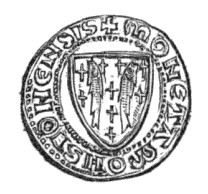
Coin of Henry IV of Bar

Henry IV of Bar (abt 1315–1344) was count of Bar from 1336 to 1344. His aunt, Joan of Bar, Countess of Surrey, governed Bar in his name during his minority. He was the son of Edward I of Bar and his wife Marie of Burgundy. He married Yolande of Dampierre (died 1395), a granddaughter of Robert III, Count of Flanders.

Henry and Yolande had two sons:

- Edward II of Bar, became count on the death of his father
- Robert I of Bar, became count on the death of his brother

== Sources ==
- (in French) Georges Poull, La Maison souveraine et ducale de Bar, 1994

German nobility
Preceded by Edward I	Count of Bar; 1336 – 1344	Succeeded by Edward II
