= War of Metz =

Military conflict

The War of Metz or War of Four Lords (German: Vierherrenkrieg, "four lords' war") was a feudal conflict which devastated the region around Metz between 1324 and 1326. At the Siege of Metz, in 1324, cannons were used, perhaps for the first time in Western Europe.

Following a series of quarrels with the city of Metz and mounting debts incurred by its bourgeoisie, King John of Bohemia, his uncle Baldwin, Archbishop of Trier, Count Edward I of Bar, and Duke Frederick IV of Lorraine joined together to form a coalition to take the city by force. The war was fought chiefly over the possession of land and the obligations, not always respected, of the burgesses as vassals of their lords. The debts the burgesses owed were many and varied:

- the ransom of the duke of Lorraine paid to Louis of Bavaria after he was made prisoner after the Battle of Mühldorf in 1322
- the ransom of the count of Bar paid to Frederick IV of Lorraine after he was made prisoner after a battle near Nancy in 1313
- the 50,000 pound loan to Henry VII, father of the king of Bohemia, in order to finance his successful bid for the Holy Roman Emperorship
- the garrisoning of troops in the city by the count of Bar during a war with the Bishop of Verdun

After two years of trouble, Pope John XXII refused his financial assistance and the four princes were constrained to come to terms with the citizens of Metz. By March 1325 peace was restored and a treaty was signed called the "Peace of Herrings", as Metz was depending on herrings for food while the lords blocked incoming trade routes. The negotiations took place at Pont-à-Mousson. The burgesses promised not to set up markets on the fiefs of the lords without their consent.

== Sources ==
- Bour René: "Histoire de Metz", Metz, 1950.
- Le Moigne François-Yves: "Histoire de Metz", 1986.
