= Henry I of Bar =

Henry I of Bar (1158–1191) was Count of Bar, lord of Mousson and Amance from 1170 to 1190. He was the son of Renaut II of Bar and Agnes of Champagne.

He was still under-age at the time of his father's death, and his mother acted as regent for him from 1170 to 1173. Since some of his ancestors had been Counts of Verdun, Agnes of Champagne reclaimed the county of Verdun from its bishop in 1172, but he resisted. She responded by laying waste the diocese of Verdun. Both mother and son were excommunicated and forced to submit in 1177.

In 1178, the Bishop of Toul began to construct a fortress at Liverdun, with the authorisation of the Duke of Upper Lorraine, Simon II. Overwhelmed by the size of the task, he entrusted it to Henry, who made use of it. This did not compromise his good relations with the Duke, although the latter could have felt threatened by the fortresses of Liverdun, Amance and Mousson.

Through his mother, Henry was a first cousin of Philip II of France and was present at his coronation on 1 November 1179 at Reims by their uncle William White Hands, Cardinal Archbishop of Reims.

After the fall of Jerusalem in 1187, Henry joined the Third Crusade. He set out in the middle of 1189, before Kings Philip and Richard. On arriving in what remained of the Kingdom of Jerusalem, he took part in the siege of Acre where he reportedly seized the personal tent of the Sultan. He was joined there in summer 1190 by his uncles Theobald V of Blois and Stephen I of Sancerre, and his cousin Henry II of Champagne. On 4 October 1190, he was seriously wounded in battle against the forces of Saladin, and died from these injuries in 1191.
