= Philip, Count of Longueville =

14th Century Count of Longueville

Philip of Navarre, Count of Longueville (1336–1363) was a younger brother and supporter of Charles II of Navarre, a claimant to the French throne. The son of Philip III of Navarre and Joan II of Navarre, he married Yolande of Flanders in 1353. She was the daughter of Robert of Flanders and Joan of Brittany (from the House of Capet) and the widow of Henry IV of Bar. The marriage was childless, though by his mistress Jeannette d'Aisy Philip had two illegitimate children - Lancelot (who was granted Longueville as a gift in 1371 by his uncle Charles II of Navarre so long as he served in the company of the Duke of Brittany) and Robine (granted Longueville by her uncle Louis of Navarre in 1367). Philip and his brother Charles fought against John II of France in 1353.

== Murder of Charles de la Cerda ==
Christmas 1353 he followed his brother Charles to Paris where they intended to pick a quarrel. On arrival they exchanged insults with Charles de la Cerda (also known as Charles of Spain), the Constable of France, in the king's presence, Philip even going so far a drawing his dagger.

Two weeks later Charles de la Cerda was travelling unescorted through Normandy when on 7 January 1354 Philip with a band of Norman and Navarrese followers including John, Count of Harcourt, the Bascon de Mareuil and Rabigot Dury, came to the village of l'Aigle and inn where Charles was spending the night. After surrounding the inn Philip stormed into Charles bedroom saying "Charles of Spain, I am Philip, son of a King, whom you have foully slandered". According to one account Charles begged for his life and promised to leave France forever, but the Bascon de Mareuil and Rabigot Dury fell upon him with four other troopers and stabbed him to death. In all eighty wounds was found on the body of Charles of Spain. The murder of Charles of Spain brought about a break in relations between the King of Navarre and the King of France and occasioned the first of Charles of Navarre's many rapprochements with the English. This time it was not to last long. Already in February Philips brother was, formally at least, reconcile to King John II. In the Treaty of Mantes concluded 22 February Charles of Navarre gained considerable territories in Lower Normandy as well as promises of pardons for Charles, his brothers and confederates for the murder of Charles of Spain.

== Alliance with England ==
On 5 April 1356, John II unexpectedly, and to contemporaries quite shockingly, personally had Charles II arrested while he was attended a council of the leading noblemen of Normandy at Rouen. And so open war broke out between the Houses of Evreux and Valois as the King of France's armies lay siege to Evreux, Charles' administrative seat in Normandy. It fell to Philip to defend his imprisoned brother's interests in Normandy. After a brief attempt to negotiate with John II he withdrew to the Cotentin where he set up headquarters at Cherbourg and proclaimed himself his brother's lieutenant in France. Though the region had a long tradition of opposition to the French Crown the local nobility were reluctant to throw in their support as the Navarrese caused appeared doomed to fail. Philip sent his chief lieutenants Martin Henriques and Pedro Remirez back to Navarre to raise troops. There Louis, the youngest of the three brothers, was already busy raising money and seeking allies in Spain and at Avignon. However Philip knew that the resources of Navarre alone could never be enough to sustain a war against France and by the end of April he had sent to emissaries to England to seek an alliance. Though initially sceptical by 4 May the English government had decided to divert Henry, Duke of Lancaster's planned invasion of Brittany to Normandy. On 28 May Philip formally renounced his homage to the King of France and declared war on his former liege.

Henry of Lancaster arrived in the Contentin 1 June 1356 bringing with him some 1300 men. To this Philip added 300 of his own retainers. They were also joined by Robert Knolles bringing with him 800 men from the English garrisons in Brittany. The small but all mounted army rode out from Montebourg on 22 June. They were too late to save Evereux, but arrived in time to relieve and reinforce the Navarrese garrison at Pont-Audemer. From there they moved south reaching Conches-en-Ouche on 3 July only to find that the place had just fallen to the French. Driving off a small French army outside the walls of Breteuil they went to capture Verneuil by storm before turning west again on 8 July. By 13 July the army was back at Montebourg. They had failed to relieve Evreux, but brought back considerable booty making the short campaign a profitable venture for the participants. The raid also caused John II to be caught in a pointless siege of Breteuil instead of focusing on the threatening events taking place to the south. On 20 August he paid the garrison an enormous sum for surrendering the castle and rejoin Philip in the Cotentin.

The rest of the year Philip spent in England together with his Chancellor Thomas de Ladit to settle the terms of his alliance with Edward III. Philip did homage to Edward III as King of France and Duke of Normandy and promised to serve Edward against anyone except his own brothers. The formal agreement was concluded at the king's hunting lodge at Clarendon in Wiltshire. Philip was to have possession of anything own by him or his brother and keep all his conquests up to a value of 60 000 écus, a considerable sum. Edward was to have the demesne lands of the dukes of Normandy and anything else Philip might conquer. Philip was also required to surrender any place of special military or political value. Well satisfied Philip left England in early December with letters appointing him Edward III's Lieutenant in Normandy.

The capture of John II in the Battle of Poitiers on 17 September threw the French government, now headed by the Dauphin, into disarray. This allowed Philip reinforced with several shiploads of fresh soldiers from Navarre, to go on the offensive. Avranches was captured early December, by the end of 1356 Saint-Lô was the only significant place in the Cotentin holding out for the Dauphin.

In 1357, the English and Navarrese began spilling out from Normandy into Île de France. In January that year Philip rode out of the Cotentin with a mounted force of 700 of his own Navarrese and Norman retainers reinforced by a 100 English and German men-at-arms under the English captain Sir Richard Totesham. Travelling east into the Bessin they occupied several castles east of Bayeux before setting out towards Paris causing considerable panic. Passing Chartres they came within 8 miles from Paris before returning home.

Philip returned home to discover that the Duke of Lancaster had taken over control of Avranches and installed an English garrison there. Outraged Philip went to Lancaster's camp outside Rennes to complain. Though Lancaster agreed to reinstate the Navarrese garrison his captains remained in possession. Philip also became embroiled in another dispute with the English government. When the heirless Norman nobleman Godfrey of Harcourt fell in battle against the French in November 1356 Philip had taken possession of his castle, Saint-Sauveur-le-Vicomte, one of strongest and most valuable in the region. However Edward III sent his own men to take over the castle, citing a previous agreement with Godfrey of Harcourt had gifted the castle to the English King. Philip sent his Chancellor to Westminster to protest, but was overruled.

== Revolution in Paris ==
September 1357 negotiations began in London between the English government and King John II, who was still a prisoner. Philip had attempted to persuade Edward that the release of his brother Charles should be one of the conditions for a truce with France, but met only evasions. 9 November 1357 Charles of Navarre escaped from his prison at Arleux, three weeks later he was received as a hero returned by a Paris increasingly hostile to the Dauphin's government. This sped up the proceedings considerably and the kings agreed to a draft treaty, which among other things, provided that Philip of Navarre should be restored to all that he had held in France before the outbreak of the civil war. Peace between France and England was however not in the interest of the King of Navarre who relied on the continued political instability to achieve his political ambitions.

In December Charles left Paris for Normandy to build up his strength before his final showdown with the Dauphin. He returned to Paris in February 1358 where he allied with the Provost of the Merchants, Etienne Marcel. However, by July the Dauphin had gained the advantage in the power struggle; he had the support of the French aristocracy, the Parisians, provoked by the presence of English and Navarrese guards within the city, were also increasingly sympathetic to his cause. Philip answered Charles' call for reinforcements by assembling a considerable force drawn from the garrisons of Normandy and Brittany. Composed mainly of Englishmen the army also included such veteran captains as Robert Knolles and Hugh Calveley and Philip's marshal John Fotheringhay. Before Philip could arrive the mood of the city had completely turned against the King of Navarre who had been forced to barricade himself in Saint-Denis with his guards. On 31 July Paris rose up against and destroyed the regime of Etienne Marcel, the Provost himself was killed by the mob. Charles now resolved upon a full alliance with Edward III. On 2 August Charles and Philip led their army to the north side of the city where they occupied the abbey and suburb of Saint-Denis, apparently preparing to take the city by assault. However evening the same day the Dauphin entered Paris by the Porte Saint-Antoine. All hopes of capturing Paris now lost; the Navarrese army withdrew to Mantes.

Spring 1359 he led a mainly English army out of Mantes to relieve the garrison of Saint-Valéry. The garrison surrendered 21 April before Philip could arrive. He instead led his army into western Champagne where he sustained himself for six weeks while evading the counterattacks of the Constable and Admiral of France, returning to Normandy in early June having achieved little of lasting value. On 20 August 1359 Charles of Navarre made his peace with the Dauphin. Philip however chose to continue in the service of the King of England as did many of the Navarrese garrisons in Normandy.

== Marriage and descendants ==
In 1353 he married Yolande de Dampierre (daughter of Robert de Cassel and Jeanne de Bretagne ), a union which had no issue.

== Peace and death ==
In 1360 England and France concluded the Treaty of Brétigny bringing the war to an end, for now. Later the same year Charles of Navarre signed a separate treaty with John II. But though the kings were no longer at war, peace proved elusive. The countless mercenary bands, routiers, whose loyalty to the English government had never been anything but nominal, continued to pillage and extract ransom. Philip was however able to retain some control of the Navarrese troops in the region. In summer 1363 he joined Bertrand du Guesclin in a campaign against the routier garrisons around Bayeux and Caen. Towards the end of this campaign Philip caught a chill and died August 1363.

== Sources ==
- Sumption, Jonathan, The Hundred Years War II: Trial by Fire, University of Pennsylvania Press, October 2001, ISBN 0-8122-1801-9
- Woodacre, Elena (2013). The Queens Regnant of Navarre. Palgrave Macmillan.
