= Edward II of Bar =

Edward II of Bar (c. 1340 – May 1352) was Henry IV of Bar's eldest son and successor as Count of Bar (with Edward's mother Yolande of Flanders ruling as count during his minority, which ended on 10 October 1349). He had no male issue and was succeeded as count by his younger brother Robert I of Bar.

== Notes ==
German nobility
| Preceded by Henry IV | Count of Bar; 1344–1352 | Succeeded by Robert |
