= Eleanor of England, Countess of Bar =

English princess (1269–1298)

Eleanor of England
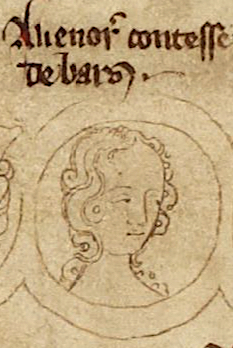
- Depiction of Eleanor on the family tree
- Born: 18 June 1269; Windsor Castle, Windsor, Berkshire
- Died: 29 August 1298 (aged 29); Ghent, County of Flanders
- Burial: 12 October 1298; Westminster Abbey
- Spouse: Henry III, Count of Bar (m. 1293)
- Issue: Edward I, Count of Bar; Joan of Bar, Countess of Surrey; Eleanor
- House: Plantagenet
- Father: Edward I of England
- Mother: Eleanor of Castile

Eleanor of England (18 June 1269 – 29 August 1298) was the eldest surviving daughter of Edward I of England and his first wife, Eleanor of Castile.

What evidence exists for Eleanor's early years suggests that while her parents were absent on Crusade between 1270 and 1274, she became very close to her paternal grandmother, Eleanor of Provence, with whom she continued to spend a good deal of time. She was also close to her sickly brother Henry.

For a long period Eleanor was betrothed to King Alfonso III of Aragon. Alfonso's parents were under papal interdict, however, because of their claims to the throne of Sicily, which were contrary to the papal donation of the Sicilian throne to Count Charles I of Anjou, and despite the Aragonese ruler's repeated pleas that Edward send his daughter to them for marriage, Edward refused to send her as long as the interdict remained in place. In 1282, he declined one such request by saying that his wife and mother felt the girl, who had just turned 13, was too young to be married, and that they wanted to wait another two years before sending her to Aragon. Alfonso died before the marriage could take place.

Eleanor subsequently married Count Henry III of Bar on 20 September 1293, and had two children:

- Edward I, Count of Bar, married to Mary, daughter of Robert II of Burgundy
- Joan of Bar, Countess of Surrey, married to John de Warenne, 7th Earl of Surrey

Eleanor is sometimes credited with a daughter named Eleanor (b. 1285), who married a Welshman named Llywelyn ap Owain and was an ancestress of Owain Glyndwr and Owen Tudor, but this claim is now considered dubious.

Eleanor died at Ghent on 29 August 1298. Eleanor was buried in Westminster Abbey, but the location of her grave in the Abbey is unknown.

== Family tree ==
Ancestors of Eleanor of England, Countess of Bar

8. John of England
4. Henry III of England
9. Isabella of Angoulême
2. Edward I of England
10. Ramon Berenguer IV, Count of Provence
5. Eleanor of Provence
11. Beatrice of Savoy
1. Eleanor of England, Countess of Bar
12. Alfonso IX of León
6. Ferdinand III of Castile
13. Berengaria of Castile
3. Eleanor of Castile
14. Simon de Dammartin
7. Joan of Ponthieu
15. Marie, Countess of Ponthieu

== Sources ==
- Connolly, Sharron Bennett (2021). Defenders of the Norman Crown : Rise and Fall of the Warenne Earls of Surrey. Pen & Sword History. ISBN 9781526745323.
- Merriman, Roger Bigelow (1918). The Rise of the Spanish Empire in the Old and in the New. Vol. 1. The Macmillan Company.
- Panton, Kenneth (2011). Historical Dictionary of the British Monarchy. Scarecrow Press.
- Prestwich, Michael (1997). Edward I. Yale University Press.
- Vale, Malcolm (2001). The Princely Court: Medieval Courts and Culture in North-West Europe, 1270–1380. Oxford University Press.
