= Duchy of Bar =

Principality of the Holy Roman Empire

County (Duchy) of Bar Grafschaft (Herzogtum) Bar (German) Comté (Duché) de Bar (French) Barensis Comitatus (Ducatus) (Latin)
- 1033–1766
- Coat of arms

- Map of France in 1477, showing the Duchy of Bar in "Valois-Anjou" colours

- The Duchy of Bar in the 17th century, as against the modern administrative divisions of France
- Status: Vassal of Holy Roman Empire
- Capital: Bar-le-Duc
- Government: Feudal monarchy
- Historical era: Middle Ages
  - Established: 1033
  - Divided from the Duchy of Lorraine: 1033
  - Divided between France and the Empire: 1301
  - Raised to a duchy: 1354
  - United with the Duchy of Lorraine: 1480
  - Passed by treaty to the French crown: 1766
Preceded by	Succeeded by
Duchy of Lorraine	Lorraine and Barrois

The County of Bar, later Duchy of Bar, was a principality of the Holy Roman Empire encompassing the pays de Barrois and centred on the city of Bar-le-Duc. It was held by the House of Montbéliard from the 11th century. Part of the county, the so-called Barrois mouvant, became a fief of the Kingdom of France in 1301 and was elevated to a duchy in 1354. The Barrois non-mouvant remained a part of the Empire. From 1480, it was united to the imperial Duchy of Lorraine.

Both imperial Bar and Lorraine came under the influence of France in 1735, with Bar ceded to the deposed king of Poland, Stanisław Leszczyński. According to the Treaty of Vienna (1738), the duchy would pass to the French crown upon Stanisław's death, which occurred in 1766.

== County (1033–1354) ==
The county of Bar originated in the frontier fortress of Bar (from Latin barra, barrier) that Duke Frederick I of Upper Lorraine built on the bank of the river Ornain around 960. The fortress was originally directed at the counts of Champagne, who had made incursions into Frederick's allodial lands. Frederick also confiscated some lands from the nearby Abbey of Saint-Mihiel and settled his knights on it. The original Barrois was thus a mixture of the duke's allodial lands and confiscated church lands enfeoffed to knights. On the death of Duke Frederick III in 1033, these lands passed to his sister, Sophia (died 1093), who was the first person to associate the comital title with Bar, styling herself "Countess of Bar".

Sophia's descendants, of the House of Montbéliard, expanded Bar "by usurpation, conquest, purchase, and marriage" into a de facto autonomous state perched between France and Germany. Its population was francophone and culturally French, and the counts were involved in French politics. Count Reginald II (died 1170) married Agnes, a sister of the queen of France, Adele. His son, Henry I, died on the Third Crusade in 1190. From 1214 to 1291 Bar was ruled by Henry II and Theobald II, who secured the western frontier with Champagne by granting fiefs to French nobles and buying their homage.

In 1297, King Philip IV of France invaded the Barrois because Count Henry III had given aid to his father-in-law, Edward I of England, when the latter intervened against France in the Franco-Flemish War. In the Treaty of Bruges of 1301 Henry was forced to recognise all of his county west of the river Meuse as a fief of France. This was the origin of the Barrois mouvant: a territory that was turned into a fief was said to have "moved" and entered the mouvance of its suzerain. It was subject to the Parliament of Paris. The Treaty of Bruges did not represent any expansion of French territory. The territory to the west of the Meuse was French since the Treaty of Verdun of 843, but in 1301 it became a direct fief of the crown, including its allodial parts.

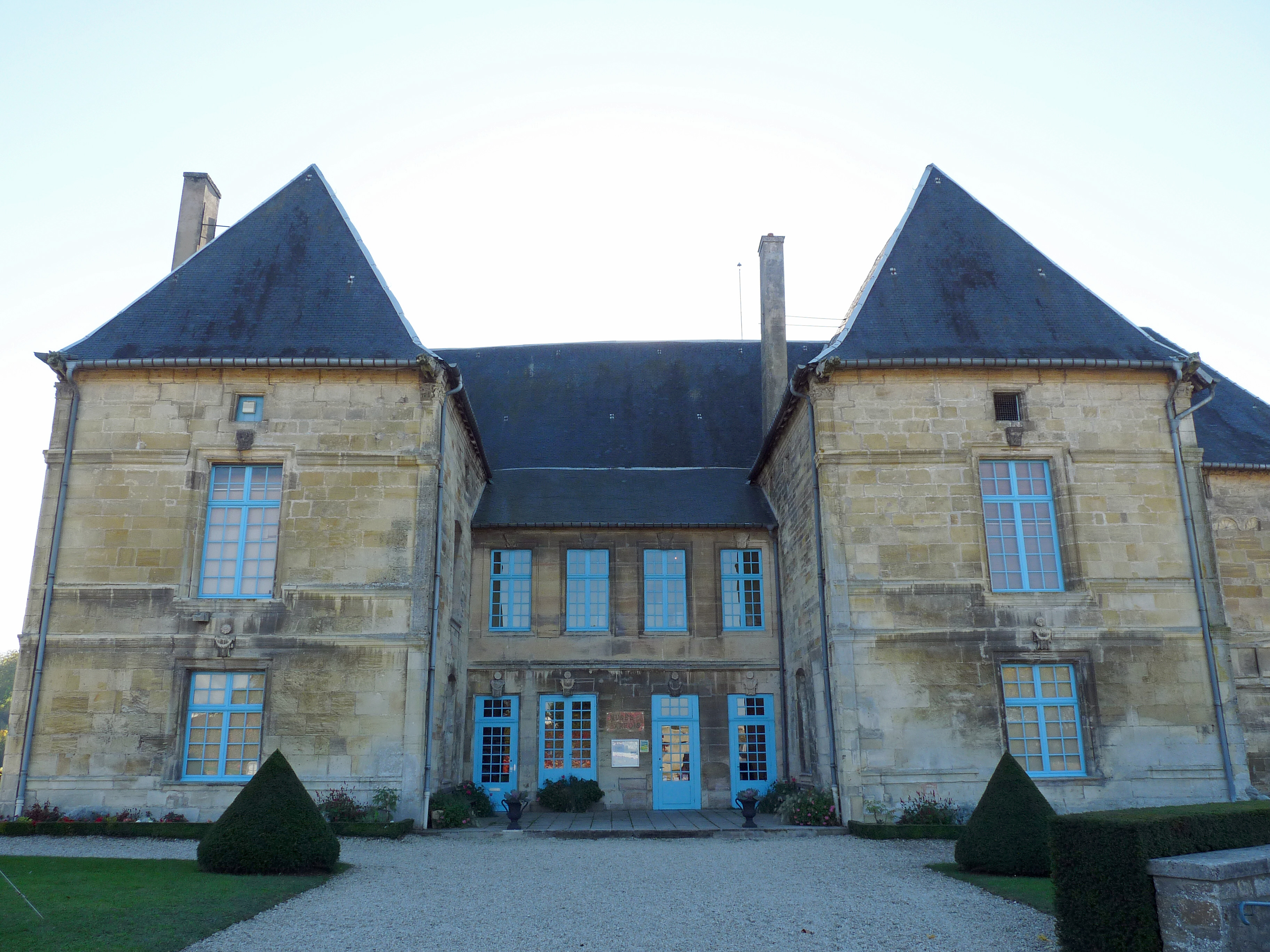
The former ducal palace at Bar-le-Duc is today a museum, the Musée Barrois.

== Medieval duchy (1354–1508) ==
In 1354, the Count of Bar took the ducal title and was thereafter recognised as a Peer of France. Père Anselme (died 1694) believed that Count Robert had been created a duke by King John II of France in preparation for the count's marriage to John's daughter, Mary. The rulers of Bar were not created dukes by imperial appointment. The only title Count Robert received by imperial grant in 1354 was that of Margrave of Pont-à-Mousson. This margraviate was frequently bestowed by the Dukes of Bar on their heirs apparent. In that same year the emperor raised the County of Luxembourg into a duchy and Bar fell between two duchies, Luxembourg and Upper Lorraine. The ducal title was eventually accepted by the emperors, however, and the imperial tax register of 1532 records the "Duchy on the Meuse" (German: Herzogtum von der Maß) as a voting member of the Reichstag.

In 1430, the last duke of the male line of the ruling house, Louis, died. Bar passed to his great-nephew, René I, who was married to Isabella, Duchess of Lorraine. In 1431 the couple inherited Lorraine. On René's death in 1480, Bar passed to his daughter Yolanda and her son, René II, who was already Duke of Lorraine. In 1482 he conquered the prévôté of Virton, a part of the Duchy of Luxembourg, and annexed it to Bar. In 1484 Peter II, Duke of Bourbon, regent for King Charles VIII of France, formally installed him in the Duchy of Bar. In his final testament published in 1506, René decreed that the two duchies of Bar and Lorraine should never be separated. The two duchies remained joined in personal union permanently.

== Modern duchy (1508–1766) ==
On 2 October 1735, the preliminary Treaty of Vienna between France and the Empire was drawn up, ending the War of the Polish Succession and granting Bar and Lorraine to the deposed king of Poland, Stanislaus Leszczynski. It was agreed that he should receive Bar immediately, but for Lorraine he had to wait until the death of Grand Duke Gian Gastone of Tuscany (which took place on 9 July 1737), so that the deposed duke of Lorraine could inherit Tuscany. In January 1736, Stanislaus formally renounced his claim to the Polish throne (although he was allowed to retain the royal title). In August, France and the Empire finalized their agreement concerning the exchange of territories. The emperor renounced his suzerainty over Bar and Lorraine.

On 30 September 1736, Stanislaus signed a convention, known as the Declaration of Meudon, whereby the French king would appoint the governor of Lorraine. On 8 February 1737, Stanislaus took possession of Bar and on 21 March of Lorraine. On 18 November 1738, the final Treaty of Vienna was signed. Stanislaus turned over the incomes from Bar and Lorraine to the French crown in exchange for a generous pension, which he used to fund construction projects in the duchies. On his death on 23 February 1766 the duchies passed to the royal domain of France as per the treaty.

== List of rulers ==
All the dates are regnal dates. All rulers before Sophia ruled Bar, but did not use the title "Count of Bar".

=== Counts of Bar ===
House of Ardennes

- Frederick I (959–978), Duke of Upper Lorraine
- Theodoric I (978–1027), Duke of Upper Lorraine
  - Frederick II (1019–1026), Duke of Upper Lorraine
- Frederick III (1027–1033), Duke of Upper Lorraine
- Sophia (1033–1093)
  - with Count Louis of Montbéliard (1038–1071)

House of Montbéliard

- Theodoric II (1093–1105)
- Reginald I (1105–1150)
- Reginald II (1150–1170)
- Henry I (1170–1189)
- Theobald I (1189–1214)
- Henry II (1214–1239)
- Theobald II (1239–1291)
- Henry III (1291–1302)
- Edward I (1302–1337)
- Henry IV (1337–1344)
- Edward II (1344–1352)

=== Dukes of Bar ===
House of Montbéliard

- Robert (1352–1411)
- Edward III (1411–1415)
- Louis (1415–1431)

House of Anjou

- René I (1431–1480)
- Yolanda (1480–1483)
- René II (1483–1508)

=== Margraves of Pont-à-Mousson ===
- Robert (1354–1411), Duke of Bar
- Edward III (1411–1415), Duke of Bar
- Louis (I) (1415–1419), Duke of Bar
- René I (1419–1441, 1443–1444), Duke of Bar
- Louis (II) (1441–1443)
- John (1444–1470), Duke of Lorraine
- Nicholas (r. 1470–1473), Duke of Lorraine
- vacant (1473–1480)
- René II (r. 1480–1508), Duke of Lorraine and Bar

From the death of René II, the list is identical with that of Lorraine.

== Sources ==
- Arnold, Benjamin (1991). Princes and Territories in Medieval Germany. Cambridge: Cambridge University Press.
- Collin, Hubert (1971). "Le comté de Bar au début du XIV^{e} siècle". Bulletin philologique et historique du Comité des Travaux Historiques et Scientifiques: 81–93.
- Evergates, Theodore (1995). "Bar-le-Duc". In Kibler, William W.; Zinn, Grover A.; Henneman Jr, John Bell; Earp, Lawrence (eds.). Medieval France. London: Taylor & Francis. p. 96.
- Grosdidier de Matons, Marcel (1922). Le comté de Bar des origines au traité de Bruges (vers 950–1031). Paris: Picard.
- Moeglin, Jean-Marie (2006). "Historiographie médiévale et moderne dans le Saint Empire romain germanique". École pratique des hautes études: Section des sciences historiques et philologiques. 20: 230–34.
- Monter, E. William (2007). A Bewitched Duchy: Lorraine and Its Dukes, 1477–1736. Paris: Librairie Droz.
- Parisse, Michel (1982). Noblesse et chevalerie en Lorraine médiévale. Nancy: University of Nancy.
- Poull, Georges (1977). La maison ducale de Bar: les premiers comtes de Bar (1033–1239). Rupt-sur-Moselle: Poull.
- Spangler, Jonathan (2009). The Society of Princes: The Lorraine-Guise and the Conservation of Power and Wealth in Seventeenth-Century France. Farnham, Surrey: Ashgate.
- Thomas, Heinz (1973). Zwischen Regnum und Imperium: Die Fiirstentiimer. Bar und. Lothringen zur Zeit Kaiser Karls IV. Bonner historische Forschungen, 40 (in German). Bonn: Ludwig Röhrscheid.
- Whaley, Joachim (2012). Germany and the Holy Roman Empire: Volume II: The Peace of Westphalia to the Dissolution of the Reich, 1648–1806. Oxford: Oxford University Press.
