= Henry III of Bar =

13th-century French nobleman

Henry III
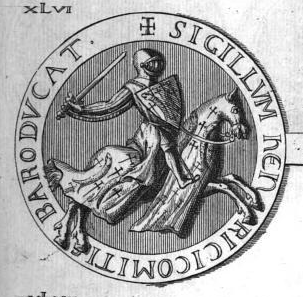

Count of Bar
- Born: 1259
- Died: September 1302 (aged 42–43); Naples
- Noble family: House of Bar
- Spouse: Eleanor of England
- Issue: Edward I, Count of Bar; Joan of Bar, Countess of Surrey; Eleanor
- Father: Theobald II, Count of Bar
- Mother: Jeanne de Toucy

Henry III (French: Henri; German: Heinrich 1259 – Naples, September 1302) was count of Bar from 1291 to 1302. He was the son of Theobald II of Bar and Joan of Toucy.

Henry's introduction to military life came as he was made a knight in a conflict between his father and the bishop of Metz. He then served Duke Frederick III of Lorraine. He was preparing to go on crusade when his father died.

In 1284, Queen Joan I of Navarre, countess of Champagne, married the future King Philip IV of France. Henry's reaction was a marriage to Eleanor, daughter of King Edward I of England. When war broke out in short order between France and England, Henry was drawn in. The fighting ceased after the 1301 Treaty of Bruges. Under its terms, Henry gave up some fortresses and paid homage to Philip for part of his lands, then called the Barrois mouvant. He also undertook to fight in Cyprus against the Muslim forces.

Henry therefore made his way to the Kingdom of Naples. In assisting King Charles II of Naples against the invading forces of King Frederick II of Sicily, he was wounded in fighting, and died soon afterwards.

== Family ==
Henry married Eleanor, daughter of Edward I of England and Eleanor of Castile, at Bristol on 20 September 1293. Their children were:

- Edward I of Bar, married to Mary, daughter of Robert II, Duke of Burgundy
- Joan of Bar, Countess of Surrey, married to John de Warenne, 7th Earl of Surrey.
- Eleanor (b.1285), married to a Welshman named Llywelyn ap Owain, Lord of South Wales.

== Sources ==
- Bubenicek, Michelle (2002). Quand les femmes gouvernent: droit et politique au XIVe siècle (in French). Ecole de Chartes.
- Panton, Kenneth (2011). Historical Dictionary of the British Monarchy. Scarecrow Press.
- Prestwich, Michael (1997). Edward I. Yale University Press.
- Small, Graeme (2009). Late Medieval France. Bloomsbury Publishing.
- Vale, Malcolm (2001). The Princely Court: Medieval Courts and Culture in North-West Europe, 1270–1380. Oxford University Press.
- Ward, Jennifer (2013). English Noblewomen in the Later Middle Ages. Routledge.
