= Joan of France (1351–1371) =

French noble

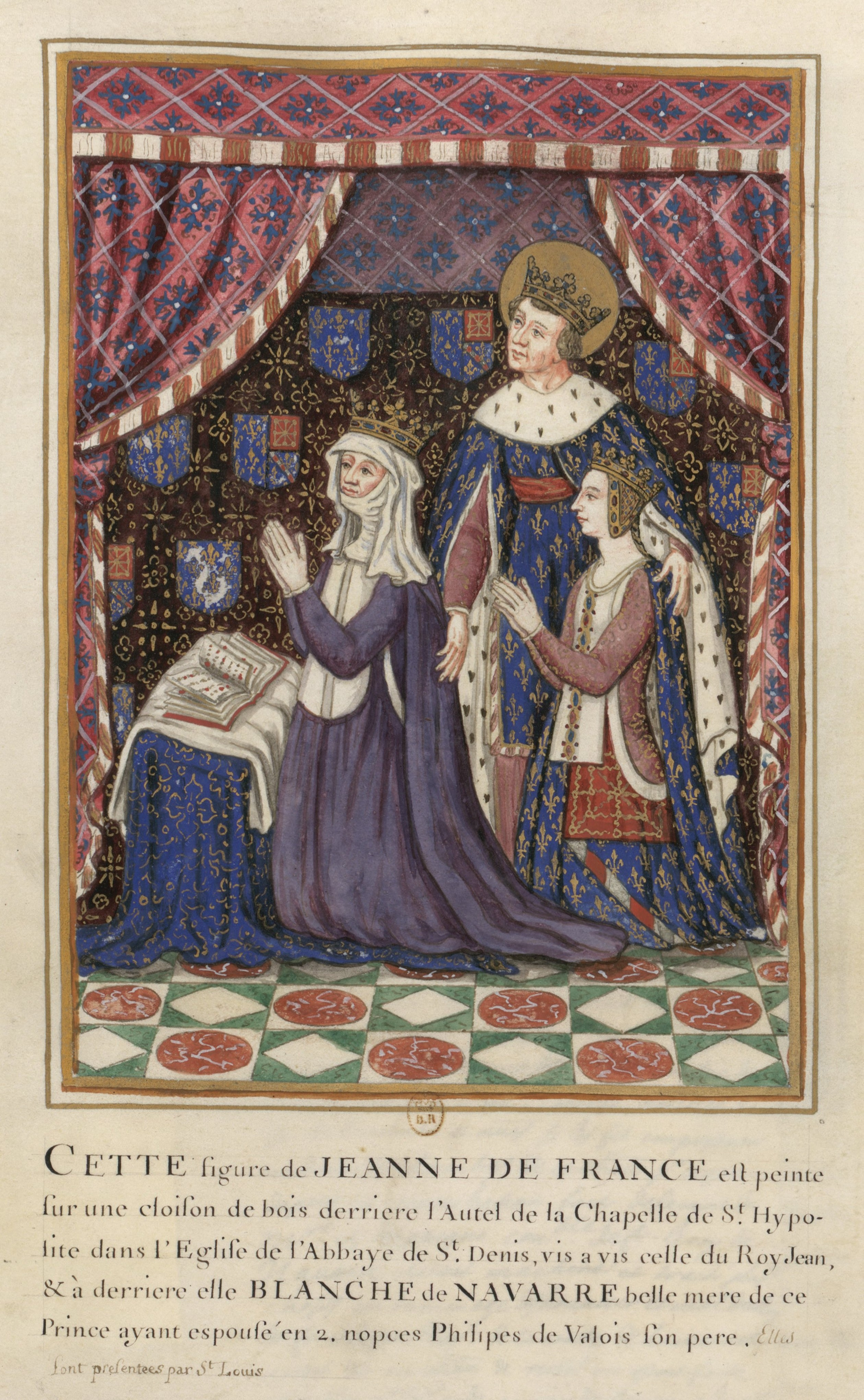
- Joan with her mother, Blanche of Navarre, and Saint Louis.
- Born: May 1351
- Died: 16 September 1371 (aged 20); Béziers, France
- Burial: Basilica of St Denis, Saint-Denis, France
- House: Valois
- Father: Philip VI of France
- Mother: Blanche of Navarre

Joan of France (May 1351 – 16 September 1371), also known as Blanche, was the only child of Philip VI of France and his second wife Blanche of Navarre. Joan was born nine months after her father's death.

== Life ==
Joan's maternal grandparents were Philip III of Navarre and Joan II of Navarre. Her paternal grandparents were Charles of Valois and Margaret of Naples.

Joan had two half-brothers from her father's first marriage to Joan the Lame: John II of France and Philip of Valois, Duke of Orléans. After the death of Philip, Blanche retired to Neaufles-Saint-Martin near Gisors in Normandy.

In 1370, Joan was betrothed to Infante John, Duke of Girona, son and heir of Peter IV of Aragon. The marriage contract was signed 16 July 1370. The following year Joan departed from France and set off to marry John in Aragon. However, Joan died on 16 September 1371 in Béziers, whilst travelling to meet her future husband. He accused the midwife Bonanada of having caused her death by use of sorcery.

Joan's mother died 5 October 1398, twenty-seven years after her daughter. They are buried together in the Basilica of St Denis, the necropolis of the Kings of France, north of Paris.
