= Joan the Lame =

Joan the Lame may refer to:

- Joan of Penthièvre, Duchess of Brittany
- Joan of Burgundy, Queen of France
- Joan of France, Duchess of Berry, Queen of France
