= Blanche of Burgundy, Countess of Savoy =

Countess of Savoy from 1307 to 1329

Blanche of Burgundy
- Countess of Savoy
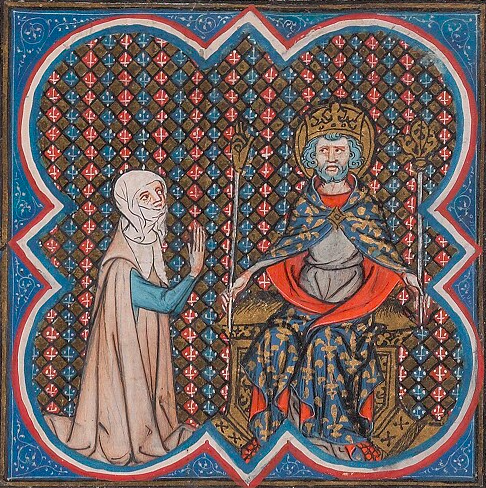
- Blanche (left) with her grandfather Louis IX (right)
- Born: 1288
- Died: July 1348 (aged 59–60)
- Spouse: Edward, Count of Savoy
- Issue: Joan of Savoy
- House: Burgundy
- Father: Robert II, Duke of Burgundy
- Mother: Agnes of France

Bianca of Burgundy (1288 – July 1348) was a Countess consort of Savoy by marriage to Edward, Count of Savoy. She was the mother of Joan of Savoy.

== Life ==
Blanche was born to Robert II, Duke of Burgundy, and Agnes of France. She married in 1307 Edward, Count of Savoy.

The marriage was arranged by her mother, and the negotiations were signed at the French court of her uncle, the king of France, in Paris. In the marriage contract, her future spouse was officially secured the position of heir to Savoy. The wedding took place on 17 October 1307 at the Château de Montbard in Burgundy. In 1323, her spouse succeeded as Count of Savoy. She commissioned a Book of Hours, titled Hours of Savoy, later kept at the Beinecke Library, Yale University. Her daughter Joan married the duke of Brittany in 1329.

Blanche was widowed when her spouse Edward died in Gentilly in 1329. She was succeeded by his brother Aymon. Blanche negotiated with her brother-in-law about her dowry until 8 February 1330, when she was secured Bourg, Treffort, Coligny, Jasseron, Trivier, Pont-de-Vesle and Pontdevaux in Bresse; she was also granted a house in Faubourg Saint-Marcel in Paris by the king of France in 1333.

Her daughter Joan questioned the succession and claimed the rights to Savoy from her uncle between 1329 and 1339. In 1346 and 1347, she used her influence at the court of her nephew, Amadeus VI, to pursue closer alliances with Burgundy to offset the pending sale of the Dauphiné to France. This led to his brief engagement with Joan of Burgundy, daughter of Philip of Burgundy and Joan I, Countess of Auvergne.

She died in July 1348, perhaps from the Black Death.

== Notes ==
Blanche of Burgundy, Countess of Savoy House of Burgundy Cadet branch of the Capetian dynasty Born: 1288 Died: July 1348
Royal titles
Preceded by Marie of Brabant	Countess of Savoy; 1323–1329	Succeeded by Yolande of Montferrat
