= King of Thessalonica =

Ruler of the crusader-state of Thessalonica (1204–1224)

- Rex Thessalonicae
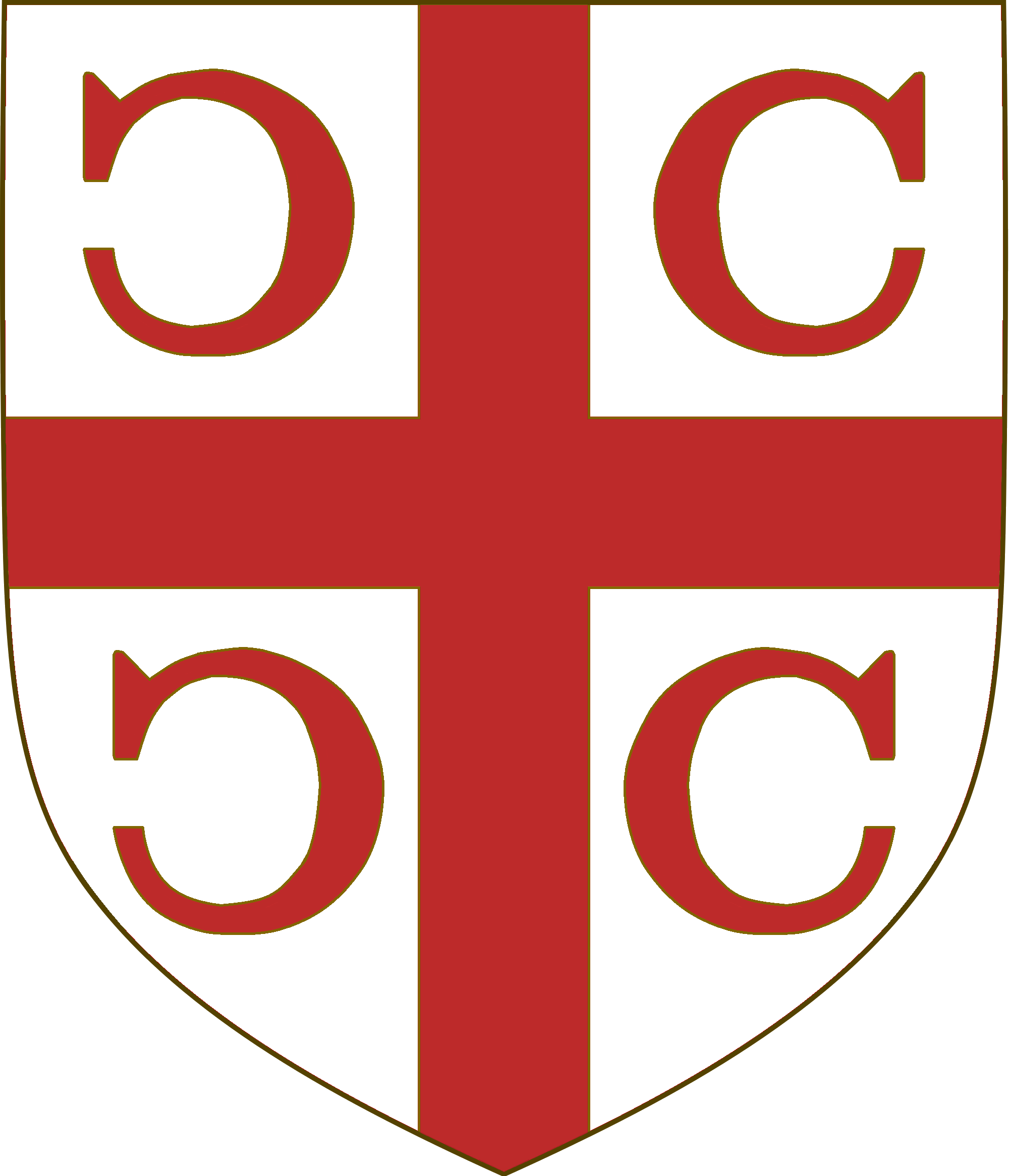
- Coat of arms per The Lord Marshal's Roll (1295)

Details
- First monarch: Boniface I
- Last monarch: Demetrius (ruling); Philip II (titular)
- Formed: 16 May 1204
- Abolished: December 1224 (loss of the kingdom); 26 December 1331 (last use of title)
- Appointer: Hereditary, vassal of the Latin Emperor

The King of Thessalonica was the ruler of the Kingdom of Thessalonica, one of the crusader states founded in Greece in the aftermath of the Fourth Crusade (1202–1204). The King of Thessalonica was not an independent ruler; the Kingdom of Thessalonica was one of several vassal states created by the crusaders, subservient to the new Latin Empire of Constantinople, which had supplanted the Byzantine Empire.

The kingdom proved to be short-lived, with Thessalonica being captured by Theodore Komnenos Doukas of Epirus in 1224, just twenty years after the kingdom had been founded. The last king, Demetrius of Montferrat, escaped into exile and upon his death ceded the title to Frederick II, Holy Roman Emperor, who some years later ceded it back to Demetrius's family. Their line of titular Kings of Thessalonica ended with the marriage of Yolande of Montferrat to Byzantine emperor Andronikos II Palaiologos in 1284, at which point titular ownership of Thessalonica passed back to the Byzantine emperors.

Other lines of titular kings of Thessalonica originated in that Baldwin II, titular Latin Emperor of Constantinople, perceived Frederick II's use of the title as invalid as he was excommunicated and had been denounced as a heretic. At two points, Baldwin granted the title to nobles in Western Europe, first to Hugh IV of Burgundy and then to Philip of Sicily. Claims to the title did not cease until the 1330s, more than a century after the kingdom's fall.

== Kings of Thessalonica, 1204–1224 ==
=== House of Aleramici (1204–1224) ===
Portrait	Name	Reign	Arms	Succession and Notes	Ref
	Boniface I of Montferrat	16 May 1204 – 4 September 1207		Leader of the Fourth Crusade. Due to already being a figure of influence, the Republic of Venice opposed Boniface becoming Emperor of Constantinople. Despite conflicting with the elected emperor, Baldwin I, Boniface was made the King of Thessalonica in 1204. Killed in battle by Kaloyan of Bulgaria in 1207.	
	Demetrius of Montferrat	4 September 1207 – December 1224		Son and heir of Boniface I of Montferrat. The Kingdom of Thessalonica fell in 1224, when Thessalonica was captured by Theodore Komnenos Doukas of Epirus.	

== Titular Kings of Thessalonica, 1224–1331 ==
=== House of Aleramici (1224–1230) ===
Portrait	Name	Reign	Arms	Succession and Notes	Ref
	Demetrius of Montferrat	December 1224 – 1230 (previously ruling king 1207–1224)		Previously the ruling King of Thessalonica. Escaped into exile after losing Thessalonica, fleeing to the court of Holy Roman Emperor Frederick II in Italy.	

After Demetrius's death, the succession to the defunct kingdom was contested, with three separate, conflicting, lines of titular 'kings of Thessalonica' forming in the 13th century. Demetrius's own preferred heir was Holy Roman Emperor Frederick II, who he ceded his titles to.

=== Montferrat line (1230–1284) ===
==== House of Hohenstaufen (1230–1239) ====
Portrait	Name	Reign	Arms	Succession and Notes	Ref
	Frederick of Hohenstaufen	1230 – 1239		Holy Roman Emperor (r. 1220–1250). Demetrius lacked heirs of his own and ceded the title 'King of Thessalonica' to Frederick. The reason for Frederick's interest in the title is unclear; acquiring it might have been part of wider ambitions in the Levant.	

==== House of Aleramici (1239–1284) ====
Portrait	Name	Reign	Arms	Succession and Notes	Ref
	Boniface II of Montferrat	1239 – 12 June 1253		Marquis of Montferrat (r. 1225–1253). Son of William VI of Montferrat and grandson of Boniface I. Granted the title by Frederick.	
	William of Montferrat	12 June 1253 – 1284		Marquis of Montferrat (r. 1253–1292). Son of Boniface II.	

William's daughter Yolande married the Byzantine emperor Andronikos II Palaiologos (r. 1282–1328) in 1284. As her dowry, William abandoned the title 'King of Thessalonica', with his titular claim to the city and region surrounding it returning to its actual owners, the Byzantine Empire.

=== Burgundian line (1266–1320/1321) ===
In 1266, the titular Emperor of Constantinople, Baldwin II, sold the title 'King of Thessalonica' to Hugh IV, Duke of Burgundy. Baldwin considered the rights of the Montferrat line of titular kings to be void as they had been granted the title by Frederick II, who was excommunicated and condemned as a heretic.

==== House of Burgundy (1266–1320) ====
Portrait	Name	Reign	Arms	Succession and Notes	Ref
	Hugh I of Burgundy	1266 – 27/30 October 1272		Duke of Burgundy (r. 1218–1272). Sold the title 'King of Thessalonica' by Baldwin II, titular Emperor of Constantinople, in 1266.	
	Robert of Burgundy	27/30 October 1272 – 21 March 1306		Duke of Burgundy (r. 1272–1306). Son and heir of Hugh I.	
	Hugh II of Burgundy	21 March 1306 – 1313		Duke of Burgundy (r. 1306–1315). Son and heir of Robert.	
	Louis I of Burgundy	1313 – 2 August 1316		Prince of Achaea (r. 1313–1316). Son of Robert. Granted the title by his brother Hugh II in exchange for his own rights to Burgundy.	
	Odo of Burgundy	2 August 1316 – 14 April 1320		Duke of Burgundy (r. 1315–1349). Son of Robert. Inherited the title upon the death of his brother Louis I. Recorded as complaining to Pope John XXII about the "usurpation" by the Angevins of the Principality of Achaea.	

==== House of Bourbon (1320–1320/1321) ====
Portrait	Name	Reign	Arms	Succession and Notes	Ref
	Louis II of Bourbon	14 April 1320 – 1320/1321		Count of Clermont-en-Beauvaisis (r. 1317–1342) and Duke of Bourbon (r. 1327–1342). Odo sold his claims to the titles 'King of Thessalonica' and 'Prince of Achaea' to Louis in 1320. Great-grandson of Hugh I.	

During Louis of Bourbon's purchase of the titles, Philip of Taranto, Angevin pretender to the title, intervened and offered the same sum to purchase them. Through his purchase of the titles, Philip acquired the Burgundian claim to the titles as well, ensuring that there was now only a single line of pretenders. Louis of Bourbon likely only agreed to selling the titles because of the 1321 engagement between Philip's son of the same name and Louis's daughter Beatrice.

=== Angevin line (1274–1331) ===
In the 1267 Treaty of Viterbo, signed by Baldwin II, Charles I of Sicily, and William II Villehardouin, Prince of Achaea, it was agreed that Baldwin's sale of the title 'King of Thessalonica' to Hugh IV of Burgundy would only be considered valid if Hugh supported Baldwin (and his heir, Philip of Courtenay) in recapturing Constantinople. If this were to not occur, it was agreed among the signatories that the title should be transferred to Charles I and his heirs.

==== House of Anjou (1274–1331) ====
Portrait	Name	Reign	Arms	Succession and Notes	Ref
	Philip I of Anjou	1274 – 1277		Son of Charles I of Sicily. Granted the title by Baldwin II in 1274, as per the agreement reached in the Treaty of Viterbo.	
	Charles I of Anjou	1277 – 7 January 1285		King of Sicily (r. 1266–1285) and Prince of Achaea (r. 1278–1285). Father of Philip of Anjou, inherited the title upon Philip's early death.	
	Charles II of Naples	7 January 1285 – 5 May 1309		King of Naples (r. 1285–1309) and Prince of Achaea (r. 1285–1289). Son of Charles I.	
	Philip II of Taranto	5 May 1309 – 26 December 1331		Prince of Taranto (r. 1294–1331), Prince of Achaea (r. 1307–1313) and titular Emperor of Constantinople (r. 1313–1331). Younger son of Charles II and heir to his claims in Greece. Also bought the claims of the Burgundian line of claimants in 1320/1321. Though he had heirs, who among other titles claimed the imperial one, Philip was the last person to claim the title 'King of Thessalonica'.	

== Table of rival successions ==
Montferrat	Burgundian	Angevin
Boniface I (1204–1207)	—	
Demetrius (1207–1230)	—	
Frederick (1230–1239)	—	
Boniface II (1239–1253)	—	
William (1253–1284)	Hugh I (1266–1272)	—
William (1253–1284)	Robert (1272–1306)	Philip I (1274–1277)
—	Hugh II (1306–1313)	Charles I (1277–1285)
—	Louis I (1313–1316)	Charles I (1277–1285)
—	Odo (1316–1320)	Charles II (1285–1309)
—	Louis II (1320–1320/21)	Charles II (1285–1309)
—	Philip I or II (1309/20/21–1331)	
