= Joan of Burgundy, Queen of France =

Joan of Burgundy, Queen of France may refer to:

- Joan II, Countess of Burgundy
- Joan the Lame of Burgundy
