= Joan, Duchess of Brittany =

Joan, Duchess of Brittany may refer to:

- Joan of France, Duchess of Brittany
- Joan of Navarre, Queen of England
- Joan of Savoy
- Joan of Penthièvre
- Joan of Flanders, Countess of Montfort
