= Blanche of Navarre, Queen of France =

Queen of France in 1350

Blanche of Navarre
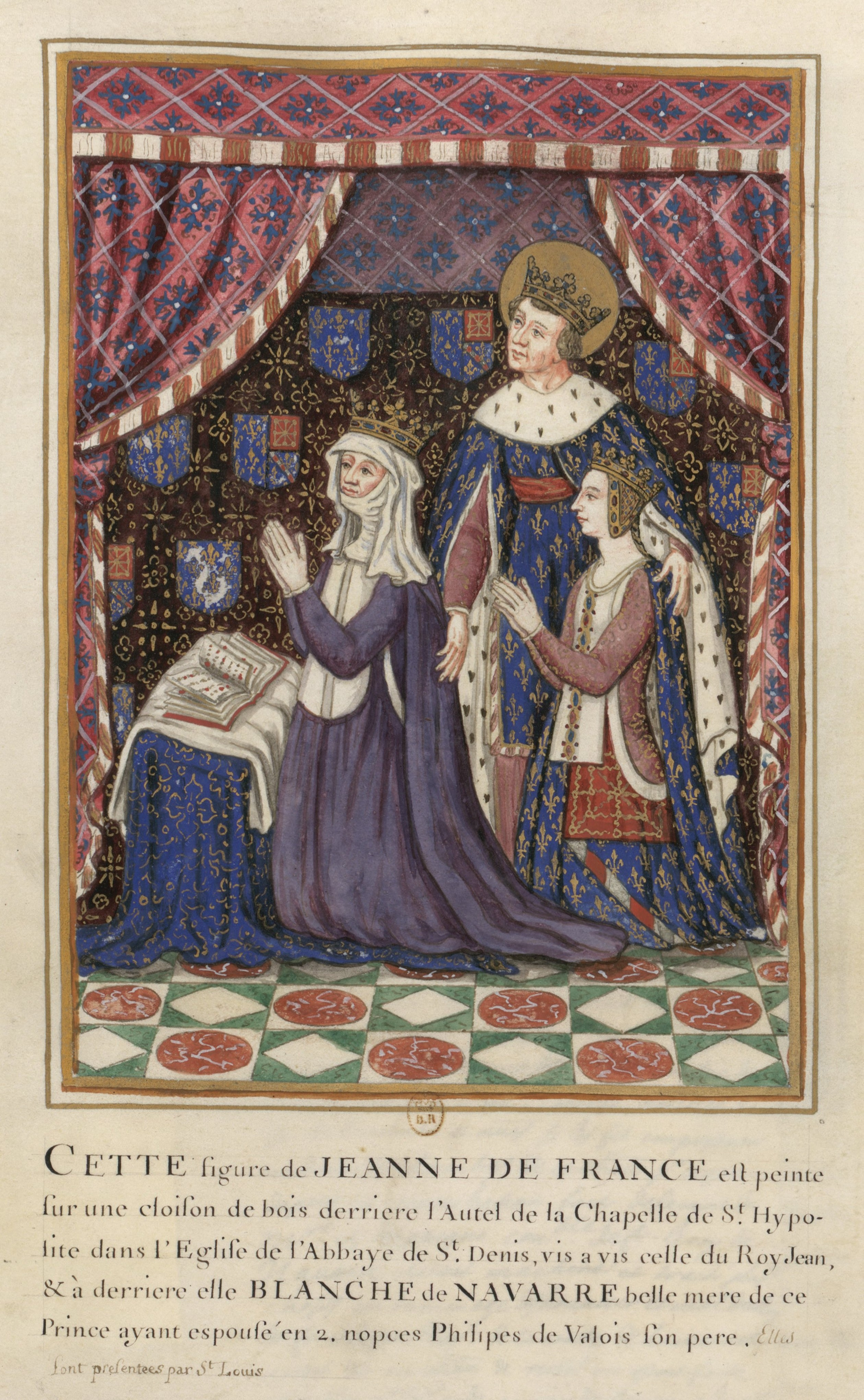
- Blanche de Navarre and her daughter Joan in prayer in front of Saint Louis. Watercolor from a Stained glass at the Cathedral of Our Lady of Évreux. Collection of François Roger de Gaignières, Paris, Bibliothèque nationale de France, 17th century.

Queen consort of France
- Tenure: 29 January 1350 – 22 August 1350
- Born: c. 1331
- Died: 1398 (aged 66–67); Neaufles-Saint-Martin, Normandy, France
- Burial: Basilica of St Denis; Saint-Denis, France
- Spouse: Philip VI of France (m. 1350; died 1350)
- Issue: Joan of France
- House: Évreux
- Father: Philip of Évreux
- Mother: Joan II of Navarre

Blanche of Navarre (French: Blanche d'Évreux; c. 1331 – 5 October 1398) was a Navarrese infanta who was briefly Queen of France as the second wife of King Philip VI from 29 January until 22 August 1350.

Blanche d'Évreux was intended to become the bride of John, Duke of Normandy, heir of the throne of France—whose first wife had just died of the Black Death—but eventually married his father, King Philip. Only a few months after their wedding, Philip died prematurely and Blanche found herself a widow.

After giving birth in 1351 to a posthumous daughter, Blanche refused to remarry King Peter of Castile and retired to the large dower lands that were granted by her late husband. Despite her widowhood, she played an essential role in 1354 by attempting to reconcile her brother Charles II of Navarre with John II of France. In 1389, she organized the coronation of Isabeau of Bavaria, the wife of King Charles VI of France.

== Life ==
Born around 1331, Blanche was the third daughter of King Philip III and Queen Joan II of Navarre; by both her paternal and maternal ancestry, she belonged to the House of Capet.

Blanche was engaged on 19 August 1335 to Andrew, only son and heir of the Dauphin Humbert II of Viennois, but the project was abandoned after the premature death of her fiancé two months later. Then, on 15 March 1340, a marriage contract was signed between Blanche and Louis of Male, only son and heir of Louis I, Count of Flanders, which provided for payment of a dowry of 50,000 livres for the Infanta of Navarre. The engagement was nullified on 6 June 1347 by the marriage of Louis of Male to Margaret, daughter of John III, Duke of Brabant. Finally, on 1 July 1345, while still officially engaged with the heir of Flanders, a marriage contract was drawn up between Blanche and Peter, son and heir of King Alfonso XI of Castile. Nevertheless, it was almost immediately abandoned by the Castilian court in favor of a marriage with Joan, daughter of King Edward III of England.

== Queenship ==
Arms of Blanche as queen consort of France

On 29 January 1350 at Brie-Comte-Robert, Blanche married King Philip VI of France, forty years her senior. Initially, she was intended to marry John, Duke of Normandy, heir of the throne of France. However, King Philip VI became captivated by her beauty and decided to marry her instead; explaining her reputation as one of the most beautiful princesses of her time and her nickname "Beautiful Wisdom" (French: Belle Sagesse). The Duke of Normandy was married to Blanche's first cousin Joan I, Countess of Auvergne. As the chronicler Jean Le Bel recounts:

«... the father took the beautiful young damsel Blanche, whom his son had wanted as a wife. The father was so attracted to her for her beauty and gracefulness that he married her, and gave his son in marriage to the damsel Blanche's first cousin.»

Due to the Black Death that spread throughout the kingdom, the new Queen of France was not crowned after the wedding ceremony. Blanche's union with King Philip VI only lasted six months before he suddenly died on 22 August 1350. According to some chroniclers, his death was due to exhaustion from constantly fulfilling his conjugal duties. Pregnant by her late husband, Blanche gave birth to her daughter Joan in May 1351.

Since the announcement of the death of King Philip VI, Pope Clement VI considered the remarriage of Blanche with her former fiancé, King Peter of Castile, to strengthen the links between the Kingdoms of Castile and France. After discussing it with Gil Álvarez Carrillo de Albornoz, Archbishop of Toledo, and Pedro, Archbishop of Santiago de Compostela, the Pope wrote on this subject on 5 October 1350 to Blanche's brother, King Charles II of Navarre, who had encouraged her marriage to Philip VI a few months before. The marriage plan was temporarily put on hold due to Blanche's pregnancy, but the Pope insisted that she be married after she gave birth. However, she refused to consider a second marriage and is said to have even declared, "The Queens of France do not remarry" (French: Les reines de France ne se remarient point). Tenacious, the pontiff wrote in March 1352 to Joan of Évreux—Blanche's paternal aunt and also Dowager Queen of France—in order to make her change her mind, but the widow of Philip VI resolutely rejected the papal proposal.

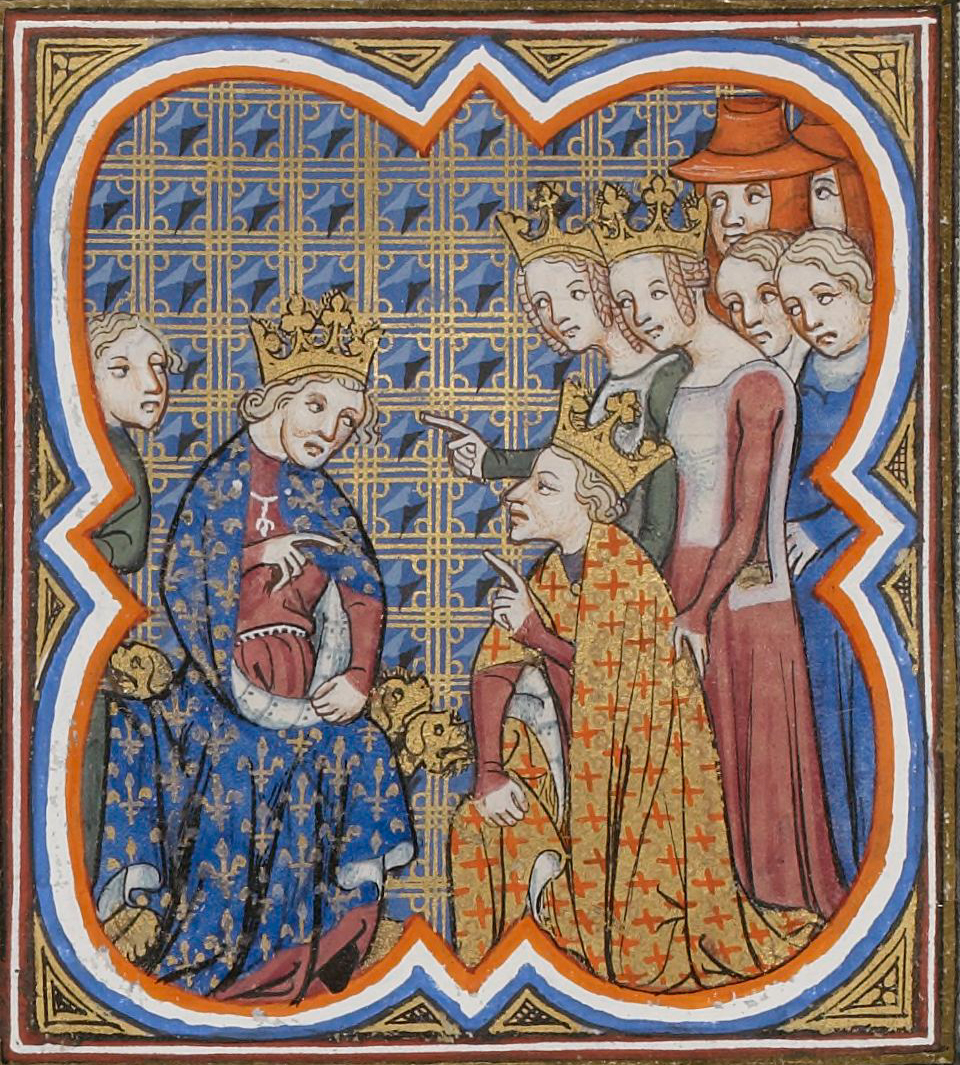
King Charles II of Navarre is pardoned by King John II of France in 1354 thanks to the intercession of Dowager Queens Blanche of Navarre and Joan of Évreux; miniature from the Grandes Chroniques de France, c. 1375–1380

== Retirement ==
Once widowed, Blanche retired to the residence of Neaufles-Saint-Martin, located near Gisors, which her husband had granted her as her dower land. She devoted herself to the education of her daughter Joan, whose marriage contract with Infante John, Duke of Girona, son and heir of King Peter IV of Aragon, was signed on 16 July 1370; unfortunately, the princess died on 16 September 1371 in Béziers on her way to Perpignan to celebrate her wedding. Blanche's retirement did not prevent her from temporarily returning to the court of King John II, whom she tried to bring closer to her brother King Charles II of Navarre. Thus, after the assassination of Charles de la Cerda on 8 January 1354, she persuaded the French monarch to sign the Treaty of Mantes with the King of Navarre on 22 February of the same year.

Blanche had an influential presence under the reign of King Charles VI of France. On 2 October 1380, she attended the proclamation of the end of the regency of the young sovereign at the Palais de la Cité, and on 18 July 1385, she welcomed his new wife Isabeau of Bavaria at Creil. Blanche was charged with teaching the new Queen the traditions and etiquette of the French court. On 22 August 1389, she organized the Joyous Entry of Queen Isabeau in Paris, which preceded her coronation the next day. During the coronation ceremony in Notre-Dame Cathedral in Paris, Blanche attended on Charles VI, along with her cousin Princess Blanche of France, Duchess of Orleans, youngest daughter of King Charles IV of France and Joan of Évreux. After this ceremony, Blanche withdrew to Neaufles-Saint-Martin and died on 5 October 1398, aged 67. She was buried in the royal necropolis at the Basilica of Saint-Denis next to her daughter. Her tomb, like many other royal ones, was desecrated on 17 October 1793 by the revolutionaries.

== In literature ==
Blanche de Navarre is a minor character in the historical series "The Accursed Kings" (French: Les Rois maudits) by Maurice Druon. She appears in the seventh and final volume, titled When a King loses France. The author describes it as follows:

Then there is Madame Blanche, the sister of Charles of Navarre, the second wife of Philip VI, who was only queen six months, barely enough time to get used to wearing a crown. She has the reputation of being the most beautiful woman in the kingdom. I saw her recently, and I gladly ratify this judgment. She is twenty-four now, and for six years now she has wondered what use there can be in the whiteness of her skin, her enamel eyes, and her perfect body. Had nature given her a less splendid appearance, she would be queen now, since she was destined for King John! ... The late king only took her for himself because he was pierced by her beauty.

After she had, in half a year, made her husband pass from the bed to the tomb, she was proposed in marriage to the King of Castile, Don Pedro, whom his subjects nicknamed "the Cruel." She sent her answer, perhaps a little hastily: "A queen of France does not remarry." She was greatly praised for this expression of dignity. But now she wonders if it was not a very heavy sacrifice that she made for her past magnificence. The domain of Melun is her dower. She makes great embellishments there; but although she can change the rugs and hangings that make up her room at Christmas and Easter, it is always alone that she sleeps there.

— Maurice Druon, When a King loses France.

== Bibliography ==
=== General ===
- Autrand, Françoise (1986). Charles VI - la folie du roi (in French). Paris: Fayard. ISBN 978-2213017037.
- Cazelles, Raymond (1958). La Société politique et la crise de la royauté sous Philippe de Valois (in French). Paris: D'Argences: Bibliothèque elzévirienne. Nouvelle série. Études et documents.
- Daumet, Georges (1898). E. Bouillon (ed.). Étude sur l'alliance de la France et de la Castille aux XIV et au XV siècles (in French). Paris.
- Surget, Marie-Laure (2008). "Mariage et pouvoir: réflexion sur le rôle de l'alliance dans les relations entre les Évreux-Navarre et les Valois au XIV siècle (1325-1376)". Annales de Normandie (in French). 58 (1–2): 25–56. doi:10.3406/annor.2008.6192.
- Surget, Marie-Laure (2010). "La fratrie, un ménage de remplacement? Les solidarités familiales privées chez les Enfants de Navarre dans la France du XIV siècle". Revue historique de droit français et étranger (in French). 88 (4): 499–522. JSTOR 43852592.

=== Biographical studies ===
- Bearne, Catherine (1898). Lives and times of the early Valois queens: Jeanne de Bourgogne, Blanche de Navarre, Jeanne d'Auvergne et de Boulogne. New York: Dutton. OL 24337186M.
- Lesort, André (1948). "La reine Blanche dans le Vexin et le Pays de Bray (1359-1398)". Mémoires de la Société historique et archéologique de l'arrondissement de Pontoise et du Vexin (in French). 54: 35–67.
- Lesort, André (1954). "La reine Blanche dans le Vexin et le Pays de Bray (1359-1398)". Mémoires de la Société historique et archéologique de l'arrondissement de Pontoise et du Vexin (in French). 55: 9–88.
- Mollat, Guillaume (1959). "Clément VI et Blanche de Navarre, reine de France". Mélanges d'archéologie et d'histoire (in French). 71 (1): 377–380. doi:10.3406/mefr.1959.7456.
- Narbona Cárceles, María (2001). Aurell, Martin (ed.). La "Discreción hermosa": Blanca de Navarra, reina de Francia (1331?-1398). Una dama al servicio de su linaje (in Spanish). EUNSA. pp. 77–118. ISBN 84-313-1878-3.

=== Testament patronage and material culture ===
- Delisle, Léopold (1885). Testament de Blanche de Navarre, reine de France (in French). Paris: Société de l'histoire de Paris.
  - First publication: Delisle, Léopold (1885). "Testament de Blanche de Navarre, reine de France". Mémoires de l'Histoire de Paris et de l'Île-de-France (in French). 12: 1–64.
- Erlande-Brandenburg, Alain (2005). Guillaume, Jean (ed.). Les Tombes royales et princières françaises aux XIV et au XV siècles - Demeures d'éternité, églises et chapelles funéraires aux XV et XVI siècles (in French). Paris: Picard. pp. 9–18. Archived from the original on 2021-10-18. — About the founding by Blanche de Navarre of a funeral chapel in the abbey church at the Basilica of St Denis.
- Keane, Marguerite (2008). "Most Beautiful and Next Best: Value in the Collection of a Medieval Queen". Journal of Medieval History. 34 (4): 360–373. doi:10.1016/j.jmedhist.2008.09.007. ISSN 0304-4181. S2CID 159609954.
- Keane, Marguerite (2016). Material Culture and Queenship in 14th-century France – The Testament of Blanche of Navarre (1331-1398). Leiden: Brill. doi:10.1163/9789004318830. ISBN 978-90-04-24836-6. Archived from the original on 2018-01-04.
- Sauvage, Eugène (1885). Le testament de Blanche de Navarre, reine de France, et le diocèse de Rouen (in French). Rouen: Impr. de Mégard.
- Woodacre, Elena (2013). The Queens Regnant of Navarre: Succession, Politics, and Partnership, 1274-1512. Palgrave Macmillan. ISBN 978-1-137-33914-0.

Blanche of Navarre, Queen of France House of Évreux Cadet branch of the Capetian dynasty Born: c. 1331 Died: 1398
French royalty
Vacant Title last held by Joan of Burgundy	Queen consort of France; 1350	Succeeded by Joan I of Auvergne
