= Louis of Burgundy =

Louis
- titular king of Thessalonica
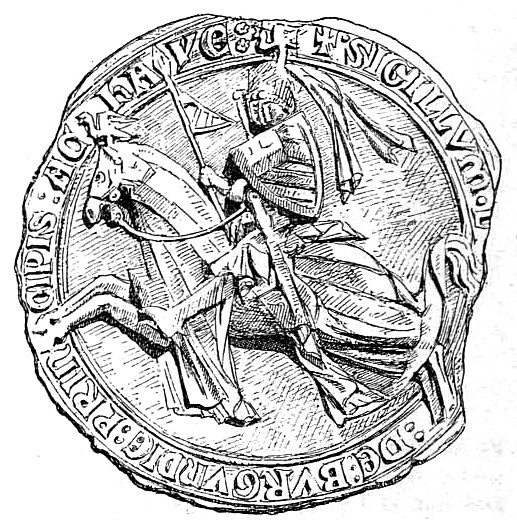
- Seal of Louis

Prince of Achaea
- Reign: 5 July 1316 – 2 August 1316
- Predecessor: Ferdinand of Majorca
- Successor: Matilda of Hainaut
- Born: 1297
- Died: 2 August 1316 (aged 18–19)
- Spouse: Matilda of Hainaut
- House: Burgundy
- Father: Robert II, Duke of Burgundy
- Mother: Agnes of France

Louis of Burgundy (1297 – 2 August 1316) was a member of the Capetian House of Burgundy who ruled the Principality of Achaea and claimed the defunct Kingdom of Thessalonica.

Louis was a younger son of Duke Robert II of Burgundy and Agnes of France. In 1313, he took part in a complex marriage pact designed to secure control by the Angevins and the Burgundians over Frankish Greece. On 31 July 1313 he married Matilda of Hainaut, heir-general of William II Villehardouin, to whom Philip I of Taranto gave the Principality of Achaea in fief. Louis ceded his claims on the family lands in Burgundy to his elder brother, Duke Hugh V of Burgundy, who in turn ceded to Louis the claim to the Kingdom of Thessalonica, which had been sold to their family in 1266. He subsequently did homage to Philip of Taranto, who was suzerain of Achaea and nominally also Thessalonica as titular Latin emperor, and agreed to assist in a campaign to recapture the Latin Empire.

Matilda and Louis arrived separately in Achaea, she sailing directly from Marseille to Navarino with 1,000 troops, while Louis came by way of Venice, where he was soliciting aid from the Republic. Ferdinand of Majorca, who also claimed the principality jure uxoris (his wife Isabelle de Sabran was descended from the younger daughter of William II Villehardouin), had landed there in 1315 and taken Glarentza. Matilda arrived late in 1315, and several barons, including the count John I of Cephalonia, returned to her allegiance. However, her army was defeated by Ferdinand and his Catalans on 22 February 1316 at Picotin. About this time, Louis arrived, making an unsuccessful attempt to capture the castle of Chalandritsa. Ferdinand sent for aid from the Kingdom of Majorca and the Catalan Company, but neither arrived in time to prevent his death and defeat by Louis at the Battle of Manolada on 5 July 1316. Four weeks later, Louis died. The Chronicle of the Morea attributes his death to a fever, while the Catalan Declaratio summaria states that he was poisoned by Count John of Cephalonia. His death left Achaea in an unsettled state, with his brother Odo, his widow, and the Angevins all attempting to gain it.

Regnal titles
Preceded by Ferdinand	Prince of Achaea with Matilda; 1316	Succeeded by Matilda
