= Odo IV of Burgundy =

Duke of Burgundy from 1315-1349

Odo IV
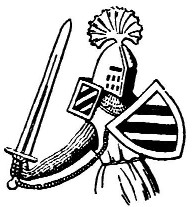
- Depiction of Odo IV, drawing by Germain Demay (1880) after a contemporary seal

Duke of Burgundy
- Reign: 1315 – 1349
- Predecessor: Hugh V
- Successor: Philip I
- Born: 1295
- Died: 3 April 1349/1350 (Aged 53-54)
- Spouse: Joan III, Countess of Burgundy (m. 1318; died 1347)
- Issue: Philip I, Count of Auvergne; John(b.1335, d.137/8); Stillborn son(b.1322); Son(b.1327); Son(b.1330); Son(b.1335)
- House: Burgundy
- Father: Robert II, Duke of Burgundy
- Mother: Agnes of France

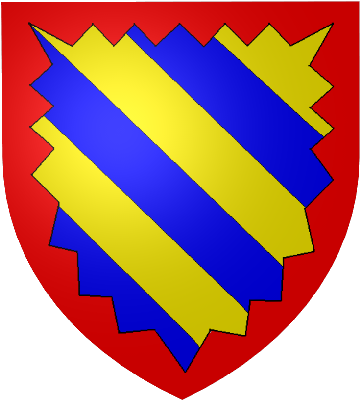
The arms of Eudes. He took the arms of his uncle and namesake, Eudes of Nevers, before the death of Hugh V. Note the indentation.

Odo IV or Eudes IV (1295 – 3 April 1349/1350) was Duke of Burgundy from 1315 until his death and Count of Burgundy and Artois between 1330 and 1347, as well as titular King of Thessalonica from 1316 to 1320. He was the second son of Duke Robert II and Agnes of France.

== Life ==
=== Inheritances ===
Odo succeeded his elder brother, Hugh V, in 1315. Odo defended the rights of his niece Joan against Philip the Tall, another uncle, after Louis X's death in 1316. In 1318, Odo married Philip's eldest daughter, Joan III, Countess of Burgundy (1308 – 1347). Thus allying himself with Philip V, who had become king of France.

On the death of his brother, Louis in 1316, Odo became titular king of Thessalonica. By 1320, Odo was complaining to the pope of the Angevins' usurpation of Thessalonica, yet later sold his rights as King of Thessalonica and Prince of Achaea to Louis, Count of Clermont.

Odo's wife inherited the domains of her mother in 1330: the county of Artois and the county of Burgundy, the so-called Free County. Her claim to the County of Artois was challenged by Robert III of Artois, who at that time was a close friend and advisor of King Philip VI. The dispute ended abruptly when in December 1330 the documents used by Robert of Artois to support his claim were found to be forged on his instructions.

=== War with England ===
Odo was a loyal vassal of his brother-in-law, Philip of Valois, after he succeeded to the French throne as Philip VI. He belonged to Philip VI’s small circle of trusted advisors. He fought in many theatres of French warfare: the Low Countries, Brittany, Aquitaine. He fought the Flemings and was wounded at the Battle of Cassel in 1328.

In 1340, Odo first fought in Hainaut, helped capture the town of Antoing and later defended Saint-Omer in the battle there against Robert III of Artois. During the summer the French government became aware of plans for an Anglo-Flemish army under Robert of Artois to attack on Saint-Omer. The Duke entered Saint-Omer 15 July with several thousands men-at-arms and began preparing the defences of the city. The slow progress of the English army also allowed further reinforcements led by John I, Count of Armagnac to arrive. On 26 July Robert of Artois offered battle to the garrison of Saint-Omer. Contrary to orders some hotheads charged out, their attack was beaten off, but their flight caused the Flemings to abandon their defensive works in pursuit. The Duke of Burgundy now decided to sally with the Count of Armagnac. During the battle the Duke got into a fierce fight with the English and Brugeois contingents and barely escaped back behind the walls. Meanwhile, however the Count of Armagnac had scattered the enemy left flank. The loss of most of his Flemish troops forced Robert of Artois to flee back to Flanders.

He took part in the War of the Breton Succession as a partisan of Charles of Blois serving as advisor to his nephew John, Duke of Normandy, during the latter’s campaign in Brittany in the autumn 1341.

He served together with the Duke of Normandy and the Chancellor of France, Guillaume Flote, as French ambassadors to a peace conference at Avignon in the summer 1344. The conference was however actively sabotaged by the English. Henry, Earl of Derby who had been announced as the head of the English delegation, claimed once he arrived at Avignon to be there only in a private capacity for devotional reasons and the minor English officials who were officially there had no instructions.

In 1346, he was in Guyenne combatting the English. In spring that year, the French government decided to field so far the strongest army in the south-west. The Duke of Burgundy followed John of Normandy south together with a substantial number of northern nobles and such dignitaries as Raoul II of Brienne, Count of Eu, the Constable of France, both Marshals and the Master of Crossbowmen. In April, Normandy laid siege to the town of Aiguillon, which controlled the confluence between the Lot and the Garonne. There they still remained in August, when John of Normandy was urgently recalled to the north to help stop Edward III, who had landed in Normandy. The French 1346 campaign in the south ended, having accomplished nothing.

In September, Edward III laid siege to Calais. As Artois became the main theatre of the war, relations between the Duke and King Philip VI plummeted. The Duke governed Artois on behalf of his wife, but the royal government increasingly disregarded local officials and even began making its own appointments. In December 1346, Philip suspended the Duke’s government altogether.

=== Death and legacy ===
Odo was present at the coronation of Pope Clement VI at Avignon on 19 May 1342.

Perhaps the greatest legacy of Odo IV is seen in the subsequent Burgundian court of the Valois dukes, for Odo was a patron of the arts and the church and sponsored many young artists. He also endeavoured to establish good political connections and by marrying a French royal princess assured good relations with the king. The premature death of his son Philip made his four-year-old grandson the heir presumptive. He succeeded Odo IV as Philip I after Odo died of the plague. Most sources place his death at Sens, on Friday, 3 April 1349. Some sources give the year as 1350.

== Family ==
Louis IX of France
Philip III of France
Philip IV of France	Charles of Valois
Robert II of Burgundy	Agnes of France
Philip V of France	Louis X of France	Margaret of Burgundy	Joan of Burgundy	Philip VI of France
Joan II of Navarre	John II of France
Joan III of Burgundy	Odo IV of Burgundy

=== Children ===
By his wife Joan III, Odo had six sons, most of whom died young:

- a stillborn son (1322)
- Philip (1323–1346), Count of Auvergne
- John (1325–1327 or 1328)
- three sons who died young, born in 1327, 1330, and 1335

== Portrayal in film ==
Odo (as Eudes) is a supporting character in Les Rois maudits (The Accursed Kings), a series of French historical novels by Maurice Druon. He was portrayed by Georges Riquier in the 1972 French miniseries adaptation of the series, and by C. Florescu in the 2005 adaptation.

== Sources ==
- Bouchard, Constance B. (1995). "Burgundy". In Kibler, William W.; Zinn, Grover A. (eds.). Medieval France: An Encyclopedia. Garland Publishing.
- Jackson-Laufer, Guida Myrl (1999). Women Rulers throughout the Ages: An Illustrated Guide. ABC-CLIO.
- Sumption, Jonathan (1990). Trial by Battle:The Hundred Years War. Vol. I. Faber & Faber Ltd.
- Topping, Peter (1975). "The Morea:1311-1364". In Hazard, Harry W. (ed.). A History of the Crusades: The Fourteenth and Fifteenth Centuries. Vol. III. University of Wisconsin Press.

Regnal titles
Preceded by Hugh V	Duke of Burgundy; 1315–1349	Succeeded by Philip of Rouvres
Preceded by Joan II	Count of Burgundy and Artois; 1330–1347 with Joan III	Succeeded by Philip of Rouvres
