= Battle of Varey =

14th century battle in France

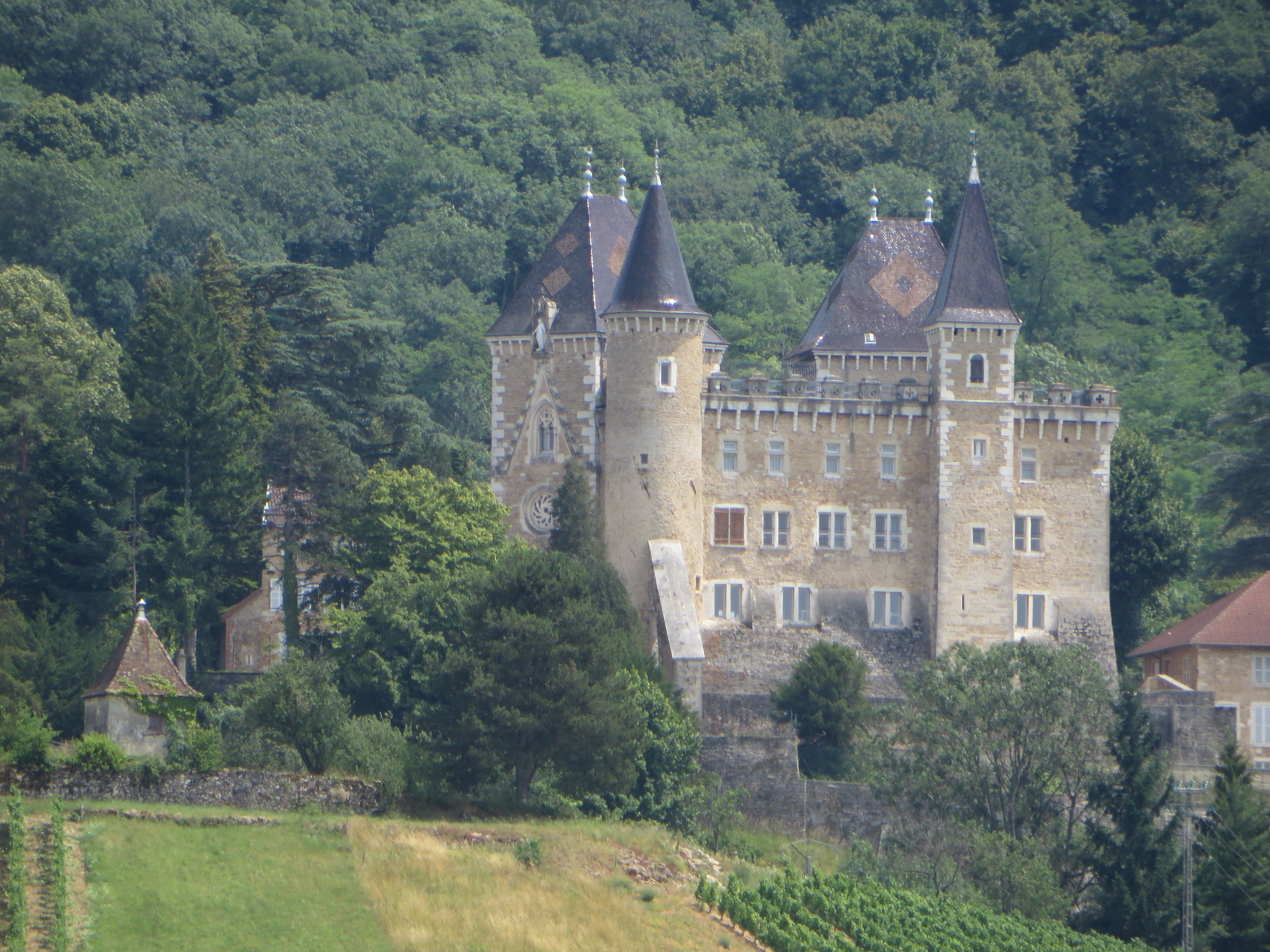
- Chateau Varey
Date	7 August 1325
Location	Saint-Jean-le-Vieux, Ain, France 46°00′28″N 5°25′31″E
Result	Dauphiné victory

Belligerents
Dauphiné	Savoy

Commanders and leaders
Guigues VIII	Edward, Count of Savoy

The Battle of Varey took place on 7 August 1325 in what is now the commune of Saint-Jean-le-Vieux, in the French department of Ain. It was between troops of the Count of Savoy and the Dauphin of Viennois as part of an ongoing war between the two neighbouring provinces.

== Background ==
The Counts of Savoy and the Dauphins of Viennois had been almost consistently engaged in disputes and hostilities for some 50 years. When Guigues VIII became Dauphin in 1318 at the age of only 9, Edward, Count of Savoy, took the opportunity to attempt the capture of the castle of Varey with the help of Guichard VI, Sire of Beaujeu, who claimed its ownership.

== Prelude ==
Edward, supported by Robert of Burgundy, Count of Tonnerre assembled a large force equipped with siege engines, besieged the castle, and proceeded to bombard it. The defenders eventually negotiated a ceasefire, promising to surrender in 10 days time, and meanwhile sent an urgent message to the Dauphin Guigues asking for help.

== Battle ==
Guigues arrival, supported by Genevans, took the Savoyards by surprise and forced them to prepare hastily for battle, which predominantly took place between the cavalry. A Burgundian charge was repulsed and forced back to the Savoyard camp, where, with the assistance of the Varey garrison, the camp was overwhelmed. Edward and his followers fled to the nearby castle of Pont d'Ain, leaving their camp to be pillaged. Robert of Burgundy and Guichard, Sire of Beaujeu, were taken prisoner, as well as John I, Count of Auxerre, and later ransomed.

== Aftermath ==
Guigues did not properly exploit his success in the battle and the relationship between the two houses carried on much as before, draining both financially. Hostilities only came to an end after a peace treaty was signed in Paris in 1355.
