= Edward of Savoy =

Edward
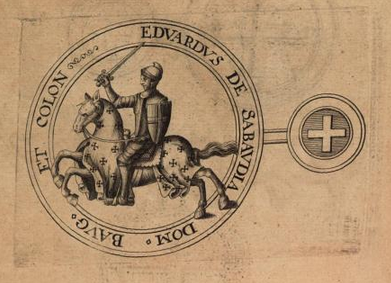

Count of Savoy
- Reign: 1323–1329
- Predecessor: Amadeus V
- Successor: Aymon
- Born: 1284
- Died: 1329 (aged 44–45)
- Spouse: Blanche of Burgundy
- Issue: Joan of Savoy
- House: Savoy
- Father: Amadeus V of Savoy
- Mother: Sybille of Bâgé

Edward (1284–1329), nicknamed the Liberal (Italian: Edoardo il Liberale; French: Édouard le Libéral; Arpitan: Èdouard lo Libèrâl), was Count of Savoy from 1323 to 1329. He was the son of Amadeus V and his first wife Sybille of Bâgé.

Edward was born in Baugé. He was married to Blanche, daughter of Duke Robert II of Burgundy and Agnes of France. They had a daughter, Joan, who married Duke John III of Brittany.

Coat of arms of the counts of Savoy

In 1325, Edward was attacked at Varey by Guigues VIII of Viennois and Amadeus III of Geneva as he was besieging Varey castle. Guigues won the battle and Edward barely escaped.

In 1327, the residents of Maurienne revolted against their bishop-prince. The bishop asked Edward for help, and Edward agreed, provided that he gain the administrative control of the diocese. The bishop consented, and was restored. That same year, the bishop of Sion refused to pay him homage, which had been the custom since the time of Peter II, Count of Savoy. From then on, the bishop and the count paid each other homage on the bridge of Morge.

In 1328, he had wooden aqueducts built to bring fresh water directly into the courtyard of the castle at Chambéry. His death in 1329 was unexpected and left the county to his brother, Aymon.

== Notes ==
Edward of Savoy House of Savoy Born: 1284 Died: 1329
Regnal titles
Preceded by Amadeus V	Count of Savoy; 1323–1329	Succeeded by Aymon
