= Philip of Sicily =

Son of King Charles I of Sicily (1255/56–1277)

Philip (1255/56 – 1277), of the Capetian House of Anjou, was the second son of King Charles I of Sicily and Countess Beatrice of Provence. He was at various times set up to become King of Sardinia, Prince of Achaea or King of Thessalonica, but ultimately ascended no throne.

== Sardinia ==
In 1267, Charles petitioned Pope Clement IV to appoint Philip king of Sardinia, (Note: Henry of Castile had expected to be compensated for his services with the kingdom, but instead was made a senator of Rome.) since the pope claimed suzerainty over the island. The island at the time was divided into four judgeships, and was the site of several rivalries: between the city-states of Genoa and Pisa, between Guelfs and Ghibellines (the pro-papal and pro-imperial factions in Italian politics, respectively) and between the royal houses of Aragon and Anjou. The judgeship of Logudoro (or Torres) was under Genoese domination since the death of the last judge, Adelasia, in 1259. Her widower, Enzo, who had been appointed king of all Sardinia by his father, Emperor Frederick II, was in captivity. On 11 August 1269 in Sassari in Logudoro, without papal approval, the Guelf party elected Philip king of Sardinia. The Sards immediately sent an envoy to Rome to persuade the pope to confirm the election. Despite the fact that both Genoa and King Charles had pro-Guelf and pro-papal sympathies, Clement refused to approve Philip. Charles soon had a falling out with his Genoese allies, and Philip's election was not recognised by King James I of Aragon or his son James, who had been put forward as a rival candidate for the Sardinian throne. Philip never visited Sardinia. The island did nevertheless produce silver that ended up in Charles's coffers after 1270, and with which he minted some coin.

== Latin East ==
Pursuant to the Treaty of Viterbo of 24 May 1267, Charles arranged for Philip to marry Isabel, daughter and heiress of Prince William II of Achaea. According to the treaty, Philip became William's heir in the event that the prince had no son, but should Philip die without issue, the inheritance would revert to Charles or Charles's heir. In June 1270, Charles's representatives exchanged oaths and ratifications with William regarding the marriage. The wedding took place "with great splendour" at Trani in Charles's kingdom on 28 May 1271. Isabel, who was only twelve years old, went to live with the Sicilian royal family at Castel dell'Ovo. In 1272, Philip and his older brother, the future Charles II, were knighted by their father.

In 1274, the Latin emperor Philip of Courtenay granted the kingdom of Thessalonica, defunct since it was seized by the Despotate of Epirus in 1224, to Philip. The emperor was married to Philip's sister Beatrice. Philip never visited his nominal kingdom in northern Greece nor used the title. He promised to join the great crusade being organized by Pope Gregory X before the pope died in January 1276. On 23 May 1276, Gregory's successor, Innocent V, listed him among those who had taken up the cross in a letter to the Byzantine court.

== Death ==
According to the chronicler Giovanni Villani, Philip fell gravely ill while "tightening a crossbow" (tendere uno balestro) and took to the waters at Pozzuoli. That failing, he went to Bari to petition Saint Nicholas for a cure. He died, aged 21, between January and March 1277, and his rights in Achaea passed to his father, who duly inherited the principality upon William's death in 1278. He was buried in the cathedral of Trani.

== Sources ==
- Abulafia, David (1994). A Mediterranean Emporium: The Catalan Kingdom of Majorca. Cambridge University Press.
- Dunbabin, Jean (1998). Charles I of Anjou: Power, Kingship and State-Making in Thirteenth-Century Europe. London: Addison Wesley Longman.
- Fine, John V. A. Jr. (1994) [1987]. The Late Medieval Balkans: A Critical Survey from the Late Twelfth Century to the Ottoman Conquest. Ann Arbor, Michigan: University of Michigan Press. ISBN 978-0-472-10079-8.
- Herde, Peter (1977). "Carlo I d'Angiò, re di Sicilia". Dizionario Biografico degli Italiani (in Italian). Vol. 20: Carducci–Carusi. Rome: Istituto dell'Enciclopedia Italiana. ISBN 978-88-12-00032-6.
- Longnon, Jean (1969) [1962]. "The Frankish States in Greece, 1204–1311". In Setton, Kenneth M.; Wolff, Robert Lee; Hazard, Harry W. (eds.). A History of the Crusades, Volume II: The Later Crusades, 1189–1311. Vol. 2 (Second ed.). Madison, Milwaukee, and London: University of Wisconsin Press. pp. 234–275. ISBN 0-299-04844-6.
- Nicol, Donald M. (1984). The Despotate of Epiros, 1267-1479. Cambridge University Press.
- Schipa, Michelangelo (1932). "Filippo d'Angiò, principe di Acaia". Enciclopedia Italiana. Rome: Istituto dell'Enciclopedia Italiana.
- Setton, Kenneth M. (1976). The Papacy and the Levant (1204–1571), Volume I: The Thirteenth and Fourteenth Centuries. Vol. 1. Philadelphia: The American Philosophical Society. ISBN 0-87169-114-0.
- Soranzo, Giovanni (1937). "Review of Da Carlo I a Roberto d'Angiò: Ricerche e documenti by G. M. Monti". Aevum. 11 (1): 178–84.

Vacant Title last held by Enzo of Sardinia	— DISPUTED — King of Sardinia; 1269–1277	Vacant Title next held by James II of Aragon
