= Bonanada =

Spanish midwife (fl. 1380)

Bonanada (also Bonenada) (fl. 1380), was a Spanish midwife.

Bonanada was the midwife of the royal family of Aragon. She was evidently a trusted and reputed midwife, as she was recommended among the members of the royal family: she participated in the labor of Eleanor of Aragon, Queen of Castile as well as Violant of Bar, and was described by Peter IV of Aragon and Eleanor of Sicily as an excellent servant worthy of complete trust.

In 1374, she was accused by the heir to the throne, the future John I of Aragon, of the murder of Joan of France by use of sorcery. However, Bonanada was given complete protection by the king and queen, who also asked that she be returned from John's custody as soon as possible, as her services were needed, and she evidently was.
