= Robert II of Burgundy =

Robert II
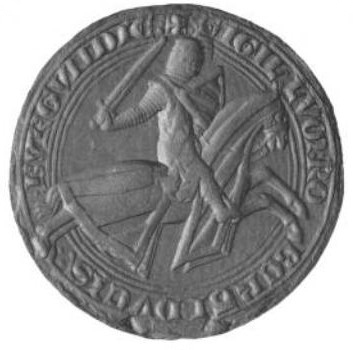

Duke of Burgundy
- Reign: 1272 – 1306
- Predecessor: Hugh IV
- Successor: Hugh V
- Born: 1248
- Died: 21 March 1306 (aged 57–58); Vernon
- Spouse: Agnes of France
- Issue: Hugh V, Duke of Burgundy; Blanche, Countess of Savoy; Margaret, Queen of France; Joan, Queen of France; Odo IV, Duke of Burgundy; Louis, Prince of Achaea
- House: House of Burgundy
- Father: Hugh IV, Duke of Burgundy
- Mother: Yolande of Dreux

Robert II (1248 – 21 March 1306) was Duke of Burgundy between 1272 and 1306 as well as titular king of Thessalonica.

Robert was the third son of Hugh IV of Burgundy, and Yolande of Dreux.

He married Agnes, the youngest daughter of Louis IX of France, in 1279. They had the following children:

- Hugh V of Burgundy (1294–1315)
- Blanche (1288–1348), married to Count Edward of Savoy
- Margaret (1290–1315), married to King Louis X of France
- Joan (1293–1348), married to King Philip VI of France
- Odo IV of Burgundy (1295–1349/1350)
- Louis, prince of Achaea (1297–1316), married Matilda of Hainaut
- Mary (1298–1336) married Count Edward I of Bar
- Robert (1302–1334), married to Countess Joan I of Tonnerre

In 1284, Robert was invested with the duchy of Dauphiné by Rudolf I of Germany. This was followed by two years of warfare which ended when Philip IV of France paid Robert 20,000 livres tournois to renounce his claim to the Dauphiné. He was among the French negotiators for the 1303 Treaty of Paris that ended the 1294–1303 Gascon War.

Robert ended the practice of giving away parts of the Burgundian estate to younger sons and as dowries to daughters. From then on, the entire duchy (albeit diminished by earlier dowries) passed via primogeniture unfragmented to the duke's eldest son.

== See also ==
- Dukes of Burgundy family tree

Robert II of Burgundy House of Burgundy Born: 1248 Died: 21 March 1306
Preceded by Hugh IV	Duke of Burgundy; 1272–1306	Succeeded by Hugh V
