= Agnes of France, Duchess of Burgundy =

Duchess consort of Burgundy from 1279 to 1306

Agnes of France
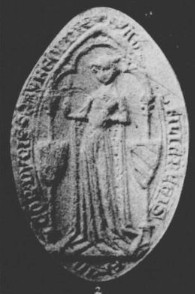

Duchess consort of Burgundy
- Tenure: 1279–1306
- Born: c. 1260
- Died: 19 December 1327 (aged 66–67); Château de Lantenay
- Burial: Cîteaux Abbey
- Spouse: Robert II, Duke of Burgundy (m. 1279; died 1306)
- Issue: Margaret; John; Blanche, Countess of Savoy; Margaret, Queen of France; Joan, Queen of France; Hugh V, Duke of Burgundy; Odo IV, Duke of Burgundy; Louis, King of Thessalonica; Mary, Countess of Bar; Robert, Count of Tonnerre
- House: Capet
- Father: Louis IX of France
- Mother: Margaret of Provence

Agnes of France (c. 1260 – 19 December 1327) was Duchess of Burgundy by marriage to Robert II, Duke of Burgundy. She served as regent of Burgundy during the minority of her son's reign in 1306–1311.

== Life ==
Agnes was the youngest daughter of King Louis IX of France and Margaret of Provence daughter of Ramon Berenguer IV, Count of Provence, and Beatrice of Savoy. She married Robert II, Duke of Burgundy in 1279. On the death of her husband in 1306, Agnes served as regent of Burgundy for her minor son Hugh until he reached adulthood in 1311.

Agnes died at Côte d'Or, December 1327, and is buried at Abbaye de Cîteaux.

== Issue ==
Agnes and Robert had eight children:

- Blanche (1288–1348), married Edward, Count of Savoy
- Margaret (1290–1315), married king Louis X of France
- Joan (1293–1348), married Philip, count of Maine and Valois later Philip VI of France
- Hugh V, Duke of Burgundy (1294–1315).
- Odo IV, Duke of Burgundy (1295–1349/1350)
- Louis, King of Thessalonica (1297–1316), married Matilda of Hainaut.
- Mary (1298–1336) married Edward I, Count of Bar
- Robert, Count of Tonnerre (1302–1334), married Joanna, heiress of Tonnerre.

Agnes of France, Duchess of Burgundy House of Capet Born: c. 1260 Died: 19 December 1327
Royal titles
Preceded by Beatrice of Navarre	Duchess consort of Burgundy; 1279–1306	Succeeded by Joan III of Burgundy
