= Neaufles-Saint-Martin =

- Commune
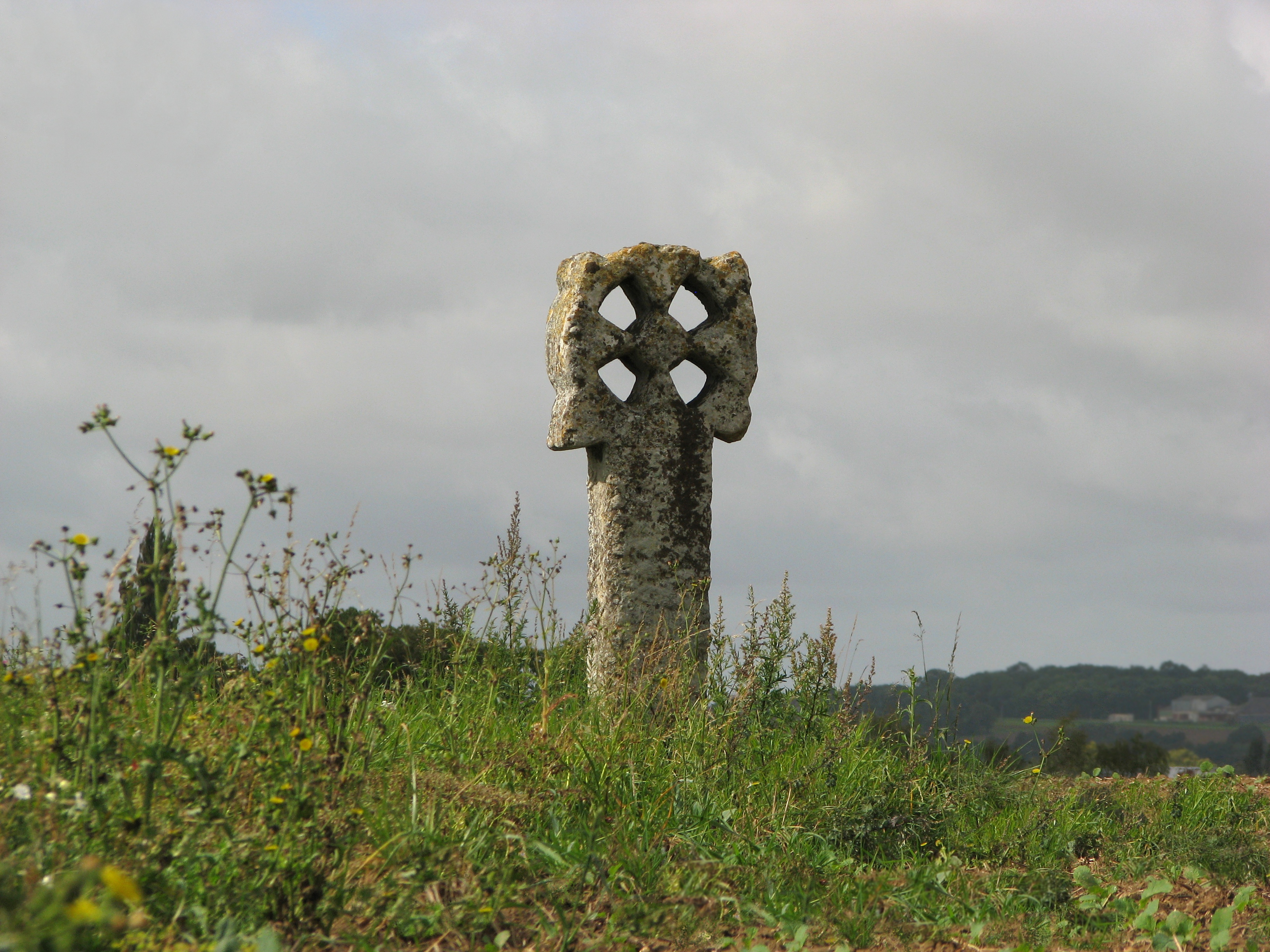
- Pierced cross

- Coat of arms
- Location of Neaufles-Saint-Martin
- Location within France Location within Normandy
- Coordinates: 49°16′41″N 1°43′26″E
- Country: France
- Region: Normandy
- Department: Eure
- Arrondissement: Les Andelys
- Canton: Gisors

Government
  - Mayor (2023–2026): Sonia Lacas
- Area^{1}: 9.07 km^{2} (3.50 sq mi)
- Elevation: 46 m (151 ft)
- Highest elevation: 101 m (331 ft)
- Lowest elevation: 41 m (135 ft)
- Population (2023): 1,289
  - Density: 142/km^{2} (368/sq mi)
- Time zone: UTC+01:00 (CET)
  - Summer (DST): UTC+02:00 (CEST)
- INSEE/Postal code: 27426 /27830
- ^{1} French Land Register data, which excludes lakes, ponds, glaciers > 1 km^{2} (0.386 sq mi or 247 acres) and river estuaries.

Neaufles-Saint-Martin (French pronunciation: [nofl sɛ̃ maʁtɛ̃]) is a commune in the Eure department in Normandy in northern France.

== History ==
On the 5th of October 1398 Blanche of Navarre, Queen of France died in Neaufles-Saint-Martin after retiring there.

== Population ==
Historical population
Year	Pop.	±% p.a.
1968	604	—
1975	799	+4.08%
1982	803	+0.07%
1990	931	+1.87%
1999	1,035	+1.18%
2007	1,159	+1.42%
2012	1,193	+0.58%
2017	1,294	+1.64%
2023	1,289	−0.06%
Source: INSEE

== See also ==
- Communes of the Eure department
