= House of Burgundy =

Dukes of Burgundy, 1032 to 1361

- Parent house: Capetian dynasty
- Country: Duchy of Burgundy
- Founded: 1032; 994 years ago
- Founder: Robert of Burgundy
- Final ruler: Philip of Burgundy
- Titles: Duke of Burgundy; King of Portugal
- Dissolution: 1361; 665 years ago (ducal line); 1383; 643 years ago (Portuguese line)
- Cadet branches: Portuguese House of Burgundy; House of Aviz; House of Coimbra; House of Lancastre; House of Braganza; House of Brazil; House of Brazil-Saxe-Coburg-Gota; House of Orleans-Brazil; House of Cadaval; House of Lavradio; House of Abrantes

The House of Burgundy (/ˈbɜːrɡəndi/) was a cadet branch of the Capetian dynasty, descending from Robert I, Duke of Burgundy, a younger son of King Robert II of France. The House ruled the Duchy of Burgundy from 1032 to 1361 and achieved the recognized title of King of Portugal.

The last member of the House was Philip of Rouvres, who succeeded his grandfather in 1349. Philip died childless in 1361 and the duchy reverted to his liege, who two years later created his son the new duke of Burgundy, thus beginning the Younger House of Burgundy.

Notable members of the main line of the House of Burgundy include:

- Robert I, Duke of Burgundy
- Henry, Count of Portugal, father of the first Portuguese King Afonso Henriques
- Hugh III, Duke of Burgundy
- Odo IV, Duke of Burgundy
- Margaret of Burgundy, the first wife and Queen of Louis X of France
- Joan the Lame, the first wife and Queen of Philip VI of France
- Philip I, Duke of Burgundy

== The Portuguese Branch ==
The Portuguese House of Burgundy was the Portuguese cadet house of the House of Burgundy, founded by Henry, Count of Portugal in 1093. The senior legitimate line went extinct with the death of King Ferdinand I of Portugal in 1383, but two illegitimate lines, the Houses of Aviz and Braganza, continued to rule in Portugal, with interruptions, until 1910 and later Brazil until 1889.

== Genealogy ==
=== House of Burgundy ===
- Robert II of France (972–1031)
  - Hugh Magnus (1007–1025)
  - Henry I of France (1008–1060)
    - House of Capet
  - Robert I, Duke of Burgundy (1011–1076)
    - Hugh (1034–1060)
    - Henry of Burgundy (1035–1066)
      - Hugh I, Duke of Burgundy (1057–1093)
      - Odo I, Duke of Burgundy (1058–1103)
        - Hugh II, Duke of Burgundy (1084–1143)
          - Odo II, Duke of Burgundy (1118–1162)
            - Hugh III, Duke of Burgundy (1148–1192)
              - Odo III, Duke of Burgundy (1166–1218)
                - Hugh IV, Duke of Burgundy (1213–1272)
                  - Odo, Count of Nevers (1230–1269)
                  - John, Count of Charolais, Lord of Bourbon (1231–1268)
                  - Robert II, Duke of Burgundy (1248–1306)
                    - Jean (1279–1283)
                    - Hugh V, Duke of Burgundy (1294–1315)
                    - Odo IV, Duke of Burgundy (1295–1349)
                      - Philip II, Count of Auvergne (1323–1346)
                        - Philip I, Duke of Burgundy (1346–1361)
                      - John (1325–1328)
                    - Louis, King of Thessalonica (1297–1316)
                    - Robert, Count of Tonnerre (1302–1334)
                  - Hugh, Lord of Montréal and Viscount of Avallon (1260–1288)
              - Alexandre, Lord of Montagu (1170 † 1205)
                - Lords of Montagu
              - Guigues VI of Viennois (1184 † 1237)
                - Guigues VII of Viennois (1225–1270)
                  - John I, Dauphin of Viennois (1264–1282)
                  - Andrew (1267 – aft.1270)
                - John (1227–1239)
          - Gauthier, Archbishop of Besançon (1120–1180)
          - Hugh le Roux, Lord of Navilly (1121–1171)
            - Guillaume
          - Robert, Bishop of Autun (1122–1140)
          - Henry, Lord of Flavigny, Bishop of Autun (1124–1170)
          - Raymond, Lord of Grignon and Montpensier (1125–1156)
            - Hugues (1147–1156)
        - Henry (1087–1131)
      - Robert, Bishop of Langres (1059–1111)
      - Reginald, Abbot of Saint-Pierre de Flavigny (1065–1092)
      - Henry, Count of Portugal (1066–1112)
        - Portuguese House of Burgundy
    - Robert (1040–1113)
    - Simon (1044–1088)
  - Odo (1013 – c.1056)

Family Tree of the House of Burgundy

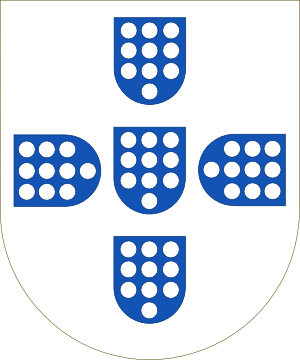
House of Capet
Robert II the Pious; King of the Franks r. 987–1031; 972–1031
House of Burgundy
Robert I the Old; Duke of Burgundy r. 1032–1076; 1011–1076
Henry the Gallant; 1035–1070/4
Portuguese House of Burgundy
Hugh I Duke of Burgundy r. 1076–1079; 1057–1093	Odo I Borel the Red; Duke of Burgundy r. 1079–1102; 1060–1102	Henry; Count of Portugal r. 1096–1112; 1066–1112
Hugh II; Duke of Burgundy r. 1103–1143; 1084–1143	Portuguese House of Burgundy; House of Aviz; House of Braganza
Odo II; Duke of Burgundy r. 1143–1162; 1118–1162
Hugh III; Duke of Burgundy r. 1162–1192; 1142–1192
Odo III; Duke of Burgundy r. 1192–1218; 1166–1218	Guigues VI; Dauphin of Viennois r. 1228–1237; 1184–1237
Hugh IV; Duke of Burgundy r. 1218–1272; 1213–1272	Guigues VII; Dauphin of Viennois r. 1237–1269; 1225–1269
Odo; Count of Nevers r. 1257–1262; 1230–1266	John; Count of Charolais; 1231–1268	Robert II; Duke of Burgundy r. 1272–1306; 1248–1306	John I Dauphin of Viennois r. 1269–1282; 1264–1282	Anne; Countess of Viennois r. 1282–1299 ?–1299
Yolande II; Countess of Nevers r. 1262–1280; 1247–1280	Margaret; Countess of Tonerre r. 1262–1308; 1250–1308	Adelaide; Countess of Auxerre r. 1262–1290; 1251–1290	Hugh V Duke of Burgundy r. 1306–1315; 1294–1315	Odo IV; Duke of Burgundy r. 1315–1349; 1295–1349	Louis; Prince of Achaea r. 1316; 1297–1316	Robert; Count of Tonerre; 1302–1334
Philip I Count of Auvergne r. 1338–1346; 1323–1346
Philip I Duke of Burgundy r. 1349–1361; 1346–1361

=== Montagu branch ===
- Alexandre, Lord of Montagu (1170 † 1205)
  - Eudes I, Lord of Montagu (1196–1245)
    - Alexandre II, Lord of Bussy (1221–1249)
    - Guillaume I, Lord of Montagu (1222–1300)
      - Alexandre III, Lord of Sombernon (1250–1296)
        - Etienne I, Lord of Sombernon (1273–1315)
          - Etienne II, Lord of Sombernon (1296–1339)
            - Guillaume II, Lord of Sombernon (1320–1350)
              - Jean, Lord of Sombernon (1341–1410)
                - Catherine, Lady of Sombernon and Malain (1365 – aft. 1431)
              - Pierre, Lord of Malain (1343–1419)
            - Pierre I, Lord of Malain (1322–)
              - Etienne, priest (1345–1367)
            - Hugues, monk (1324 – aft. 1359)
          - Philibert I, Lord of Couches (1300 – aft. 1362)
            - Hugues de Montagu, Lord of Couches (1325–)
              - Jean de Montagu, (1346–1382)
              - Philibert II, Lord of Couches (1348–1406)
                - Jean II, Lord of Couches (1380 – aft. 1435)
                  - Claude, Lord of Couches (1404–1471)
                - Odot (−1406)
              - Hugues (1351 – aft. 1380)
              - Alexandre, abbot of Flavigny (−1417)
        - Guillaume (1276 – aft. 1313)
        - Eudes, Lord of Marigny-le-Cahouet (1290–1349)
          - Girard, Lord of Montoillot (1332 – aft. 1367)
            - Jean, Lord of Montoillot (1363 – aft. 1410)
            - Oudot (1365–1400)
          - Guillaume, Lord of Marigny (1335 – aft. 1380)
      - Oudard, Lord of Montagu (1264 – aft. 1333)
        - Henri, Lord of Montagu (1306–1349)
        - Oudard, monk at Reims (1312–1340)
    - Philippe, Lord of Chagny (1227 – aft. 1277)
    - Gaucher, Lord of Jambles (1230 – aft. 1255)
    - Eudes, Lord of Cortiambles (1231 – aft. 1255)
  - Alexandre, Bishop of Chalon-sur-Saône (1201–1261)
  - Girard, Lord of Gergy (1203 – aft. 1222)

== Arms ==
Arms of the House of Burgundy

Duke of Burgundy

Burgundy-Montagu

Burgundy-Viennois

Burgundy-Portugal

== See also ==
- Dukes of Burgundy family tree
- House of Valois-Burgundy

*Royal House* House of Burgundy Cadet branch of the House of Capet
Preceded by House of Capet	Ruling House of the Duchy of Burgundy; 1032–1361	Succeeded by House of Valois
