= Joan of Savoy =

Duchess of Brittany from 1329 to 1341 as the spouse to John III, Duke of Brittany

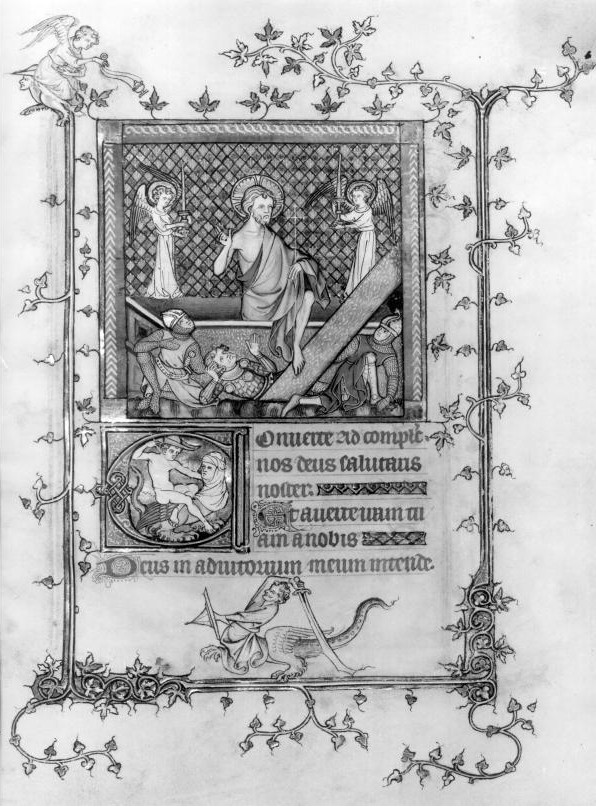
- A depiction from the Book of Hours of Joan

Duchess consort of Brittany
- Tenure: 1329–30 April 1341
- Born: c. 1310
- Died: 29 June 1344 (aged 33–34); Dijon
- Burial: Dijon
- Spouse: John III, Duke of Brittany
- House: House of Savoy
- Father: Edward of Savoy
- Mother: Blanche of Burgundy, Countess of Savoy

Joan of Savoy (Joann; Jeanne; cca. 1310—29 June 1344) was Duchess of Brittany by marriage to John III, Duke of Brittany.

== Life ==
Joan was born cca. 1310, and was the only child of Edward, Count of Savoy and his wife, Blanche of Burgundy.

Joan married in 1329, to the forty-three-year-old childless John III, Duke of Brittany; she was his third wife, John's second wife, Isabella, had died the previous year.

The same year as Joan's marriage, her father died. Being his only child, she considered herself his successor. However, Savoy had never had a female ruler, leading to a dispute in the succession. Joan's uncle Aymon had the support of the nobles of Savoy for the Semi-Salic inheritance and succeeded as count.

John supported Joan's rights on Savoy. After the marriage, Joan renewed her claim on Savoy and allied herself with the Dauphin de Viennois against her uncle. By agreement, settled by the French King on 22 November 1339, she renounced her rights of succession in return for an annual income of 6000 livres.

Joan and John were married for twelve years but produced no offspring, and John died on 30 April 1341, leaving Joan a childless widow. This led to a disputed succession in Brittany between John's half-brother of the same name and John's niece Joan of Penthièvre.

In 1343, when her uncle Aymon died, Joan renewed her claim on the county of Savoy against her nine-year-old cousin, Amadeus VI. In her will, she left the county to Philip, Duke of Orléans to spite her cousins. In the end, he negotiated a similar settlement to the one of Joan, yielding the claim in exchange for 5000 livres annually.

Joan died on 29 June 1344.

== Notes ==
Joan of Savoy House of Savoy Born: circa 1310 Died: 29 June 1344
Royal titles
Preceded by Isabella of Castile	Duchess consort of Brittany; 21 March 1330–30 April 1341	Succeeded by Joanna of Flanders
