= Hugh V of Burgundy =

Hugh V
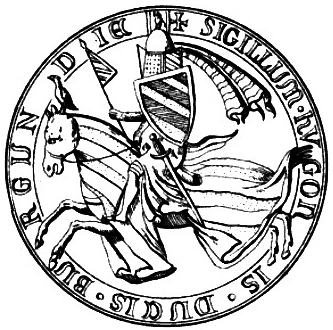
- Seal of Hugh V of Burgundy:SIGILLUM HUGONIS DUCIS BURGUNDIE

Duke of Burgundy
- Reign: 1306 – 1315
- Predecessor: Robert II
- Successor: Odo IV
- Born: 1294
- Died: 9 May 1315 (Aged 20-21)
- House: Burgundy
- Father: Robert II, Duke of Burgundy
- Mother: Agnes of France

Hugh V (1294 – 9 May 1315) was Duke of Burgundy between 1306 and 1315.

Hugh was the eldest son of Duke Robert II of Burgundy and Agnes of France.

Hugh was betrothed to Catherine of Valois in 1302, but the engagement was broken off on 30 September 1312. He had no known descendants. He was involved in the Crusades and was also titular King of Thessalonica, a title he sold in 1313 to his brother Louis in exchange for the latter's rights to Burgundy. He was succeeded by his younger brother Odo IV, Duke of Burgundy.

== See also ==
- Dukes of Burgundy family tree

Preceded by Robert II	Duke of Burgundy; 1306–1315	Succeeded by Odo IV
