= Joan the Lame of Burgundy =

Queen of France from 1328 to 1349

Joan the Lame
- Queen Joan commissioning a work from translator Jean de Vignay, 1333

Queen consort of France
- Tenure: 1 April 1328 – 12 December 1349
- Coronation: 29 May 1328
- Born: c. 1293
- Died: 12 December 1349 (aged 56)
- Burial: Basilica of St Denis, France
- Spouse: Philip VI of France (m. 1313)
- Issue: John II of France; Philip, Duke of Orléans
- House: Burgundy
- Father: Robert II, Duke of Burgundy
- Mother: Agnes of France

Joan of Burgundy (French: Jeanne; c. 1293 – 12 December 1349), also known as Joan the Lame (French: Jeanne la Boiteuse), was Queen of France as the first wife of King Philip VI. Joan ruled as regent while her husband fought on military campaigns during the Hundred Years' War in 1340, from 1345 to 1346 and in 1347. Her son John succeeded as king in 1350. She is the matriarch of the House of Valois, which ruled France from 1328, the beginning of her husband's reign, to 1589.

Joan was given significant power by Philip VI to rule after he left to fight in the war. Joan had the power of a co-ruler, which gained her infamy for her use of judicial power and gave "Lame" as her nickname. She is known for her influence in supporting learning going beyond the elite, which had begun under Philip IV.

== Early life ==
Joan was the daughter of Duke Robert II of Burgundy and Agnes of France. Her older sister, Margaret, was the first wife of King Louis X of France. Joan married Philip of Valois, Louis's cousin, in July 1313. From 1314 to 1328, they were Count and Countess of Maine. From 1325, they were also Count and Countess of Valois and Anjou.

Joan was considered to be a scholar and a bibliophile. She sent to her son John manuscripts to read and commanded the translation of several important contemporary works into vernacular French, including the Miroir historial of Vincent de Beauvais (c. 1333) and the Jeu d'échecs moralisés of Jacques de Cessoles (c. 1347), a task carried out by Jean de Vignay.

== Hundred Years' War ==
In 1328, the senior line of the House of Capet, descending from Philip IV, came to an end by Charles IV dying without leaving a male heir. Charles IV had ruled France for only six years before his death, and it was confirmed that he had no male heirs after the birth of Blanche of France, Philip VI of France and Edward III of England, the latter of whom had come to power in 1327, one year before the death of Charles IV. Edward's mother, Isabella of France, the daughter of Philip IV, was rejected. The consequent rejection of Edward III from the throne was based on the Philip V's claim to the throne in 1316, when it was decided women could not succeed in France when an assembly met to decide if Philip V had wrongfully taken power by anointing himself in 1317.

Since the succession of 1316 decided that female heirs could not take the throne, it was given to Philip VI, as he came from the paternal heritage of Charles IV; Edward came from the maternal lineage. The precedent impacted only women's role in succession, not their power in regency like the Salic law, which was often wrongfully attributed to Philip VI getting power. Salic law impacted the role of women in power and was not used during Joan’s regency during the Hundred Years' War, which gave her less restriction on her authority.

== Queen regent of France ==
Coat of arms of Joan as queen consort of France

In a document issued by Philip VI at Clermont-en-Beauvaisis in August 1338, Queen Joan was invested with power of attorney to manage the affairs of state whenever circumstances made it necessary. She was explicitly allowed to manage the finances of the state, to make verdicts and issue pardons and all powers included in the king's duties except managing warfare. This power of attorney was to be used whenever the king was absent, but it technically gave the queen the potential status of a co-ruler, and one reason suggested to Philip's great trust of Joan was his equally great distrust of his courtiers.

In preparation for his absence in the coming war to defeat England, Philip VI gave Joan more authority in the kingdom by expanding her power to allow her to handle judiciary matters. This was not unprecedented; while women had been banned from inheriting the Royal Throne of France itself, it was commonplace for women to inherit and rule the feudal vassal fiefs in France, and Queen consorts had served as regents in France before, such as Blanche of Castile. The Hundred Years' War led to a high hostility and an overall lack of trust among anyone who could take power, especially by Philip VI, who had put all of his trust in Joan.

Joan’s level of power as Queen of France was significant, as she was given status almost equal to a co-ruler by Philip VI, who trusted her more than anyone else. His elevation of Joan's power as Queen Regent went against the precedents that had been set when Philip V took power and rejected women's claims to power. Joan stood out by getting the full judiciary power of a King while Philip VI fought in the war and went against the popular culture of nobility by allowing her to have significant authority during her regency. Joan surpassed all expectations of a Queen Regent during her reign dealing with finances and judiciary powers; only warfare managed by Philip VI. Philip VI’s entrusting of Joan with these powers unique from other Queens in France had become unpopular for the masses.

== Opposition to Joan as regent ==
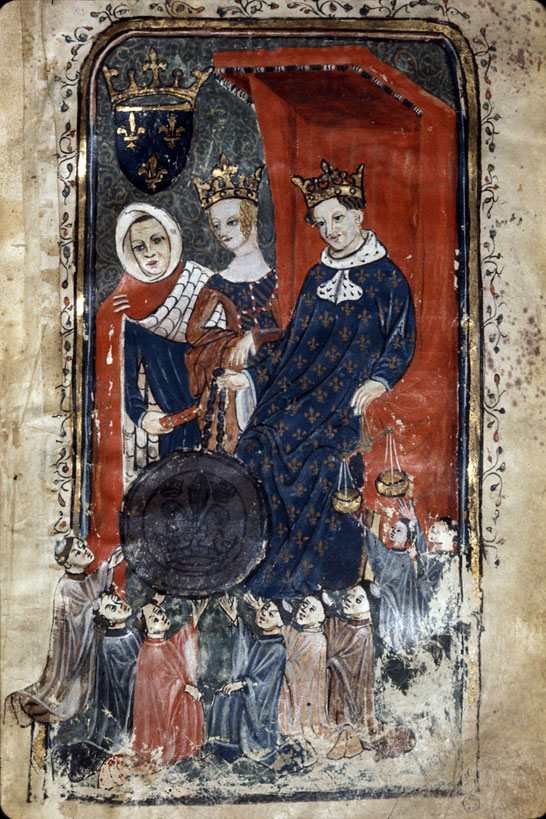
Joan alongside her husband, Phillip VI

Several queens of France were criticised for their influence in the 14th century, and the main source of knowledge of those of the time comes from propaganda and gossip against them. Isabeau of Bavaria, a queen after Joan, was also criticized for her power in her reign, which contributed to the decision of 1318 and later to Salic law. France was a challenging place for women to be powerful and the public was critical of their reigns.

Joan reportedly favoured people from her home region of Burgundy, a policy followed by her husband and her son, which attracted animosity from the nobility at court from the northwest. Her political activity attracted controversy to her and her husband that was accentuated by her deformity, which was considered by some to be a mark of evil, and she became known as la male royne boiteuse ("the lame evil Queen"). One chronicler described her as a danger to her enemies in court: "the lame Queen Jeanne de Bourgogne... was like a King and caused the destruction of those who opposed her will".

== Impact and death ==
When the Black Plague struck in 1348, it destroyed a third of the population and brought about a financial downturn. Joan died of the plague on 12 December 1349. France had become even more divided after Philip's death in 1350 than it was before he took the crown. Furthermore, France were starting to see itself as a nation of individuals with rights, rather than just as the king's dependents. The conflict also reinforced the authority of the English Parliament. The assembly of nobles and landowners continuously inspected and restricted the tax-raising powers of both kings. The high expense of such border wars compelled both monarchs to ask their people, who were progressively less willing to supply resources and labour. More parliamentary control over budgets and the creation of nation states, which resembled the current ones, were the results.

The fact that Joan took a real interest in education while her husband focused on his military career and entertainment budget greatly influenced the trend in France of education becoming sponsored by the state and a court priority. Kings of France asserted their right to rule by divine right as the country grew closer to a centralised form of government. France was the leader in Europe for intellectual progress by the royal encouragement of learning and the country's ambition to lead its culture, in addition by its economy and military might in Europe. As the idea of the nation state evolved, so did the need for non-elite people, who had been kept away from opportunities for a say in governance.

Joan was buried in the Basilica of Saint Denis; her tomb, built by her grandson Charles V, was destroyed during the French Revolution. After her death and shortly before his own, Philip married Blanche of Navarre.

== Children ==
Joan and Philip had nine children together:

- John II (26 April 1319 – 8 April 1364).
- Marie (1326 – 22 September 1333), who married John of Brabant, the son and heir of John III, Duke of Brabant, but died shortly afterwards.
- Louis (born and died 17 January 1329).
- Louis (8 June 1330 – 23 June 1330).
- A son [John?] (born and died 2 October 1333).
- A son (28 May 1335), stillborn.
- Philip (1 July 1336 – 1 September 1375), Duke of Orléans.
- Joan (born and died November 1337).
- A son (born and died summer 1343).

In 1361, Joan's grandnephew, Philip I of Burgundy, the last duke of Burgundy of the first Capetian House of Burgundy, died without issue. The rightful heir to Burgundy was unclear. King Charles II of Navarre, grandson of Joan's elder sister Margaret, was the heir according to primogeniture, but John II of France, Joan's son, claimed to be the heir according to proximity of blood and was later victorious.

== In fiction ==
Joan is a character in Les Rois maudits (The Accursed Kings), a series of French historical novels by Maurice Druon. She was portrayed by Ghislaine Porret in the 1972 French miniseries adaptation of the series.

== Sources ==
- Hallam, Elizabeth (1980). Capetian France: 987–1328. Longman.
- Knecht, Robert (2004). The Valois: Kings of France 1328–1589. Hambledon Continuum.
- Setton, Kenneth Meyer, ed. (1975). A History of the Crusades: The fourteenth and fifteenth centuries. Vol. III. University of Wisconsin Press.
- Sumption, Jonathan (1999). The Hundred Years War II:Trial by Fire. University of Pennsylvania Press.

Joan the Lame of Burgundy House of Burgundy Cadet branch of the Capetian dynasty Born: 24 June 1293 Died: 12 December 1349
French royalty
Vacant Title last held by Joan of Évreux	Queen consort of France; 1328–1349	Vacant Title next held by Blanche of Navarre
