= Alice of Hainault =

- Died: 26 October 1317
- Spouse: Roger Bigod, 5th Earl of Norfolk
- Father: John de Avenes, Count of Hainault
- Mother: Philippine, daughter of Henri II, Count of Luxembourg

Alice of Hainault, Countess Marshal (died 26 October 1317), was the daughter of John de Avenes, Count of Hainault, and Philippine, daughter of the Count of Luxembourg. She was the second wife of Roger Bigod, 5th Earl of Norfolk, Earl Marshal of England.

== Life ==
Alice of Hainault was the daughter of John de Avenes, Count of Hainault, Holland and Zeeland, Lord of Friesland, by Philippine, daughter of Henri II, Count of Luxembourg and Roche, Marquis of Arlon (d.1274), and Margaret of Bar, daughter of Henry II, Count of Bar. Her father succeeded as Count of Holland when his cousin, John I, Count of Holland, died without issue in 1299 at the age of fifteen.

Alice of Hainault had several brothers, one of whom, William III, Count of Hainault, was the father of Edward III's wife, Philippa of Hainault. Another brother was John, Lord of Beaumont, known in England as Sir John of Hainault. In 1326 he was influential in the invasion of England by Isabella of France and Roger Mortimer, 1st Earl of March, for which he was paid £32,722 or more. A third brother, also named John, who had been contracted in marriage to Blanche of France, the daughter of Philip III of France, was slain in 1302 at the Battle of Courtrai.

Alice married, as his second wife, Roger Bigod, 5th Earl of Norfolk, Earl Marshal of England, the last of the line of Bigod Earls of Norfolk. Norfolk's first wife was Aline Basset, widow of Hugh le Despencer, 1st Baron le Despencer (d.1265), and daughter and heiress of Sir Philip Basset of Soham, Cambridgeshire, by his first wife Hawise de Lovaine (d. before 11 April 1281), daughter of Sir Matthew de Lovaine, by whom he had no issue.

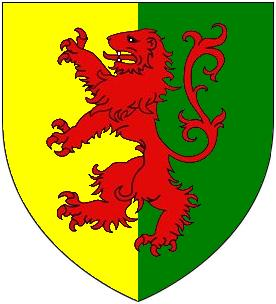
Arms adopted by Alice of Hainault's husband, Roger Bigod, 5th Earl of Norfolk, after he inherited the office of Earl Marshal of England

Negotiations for the marriage were underway in 1289. On 12 June 1290 Norfolk designated twenty-two manors in East Anglia as Alice's jointure, and on 13 June had licence to enfeoff £300 worth of land jointly to himself and Alice. Shortly thereafter Alice and Norfolk were wedded at the royal manor of Havering in Essex. According to Morris, the marriage may have been intended to strengthen English interests in the Low Countries, particularly as, two weeks later, in July, Edward I married his daughter, Margaret, to John III, Duke of Brabant.

In 1296 Alice and her husband were summoned to the ceremony at which her father's cousin, John I, Count of Holland (d.1299), married Edward I's daughter, Elizabeth.

Norfolk died before 6 December 1306. He had no issue by either of his marriages, and at his death, in accordance with an agreement he had made with Edward I on 12 April 1302, the earldom of Norfolk and the office of Earl Marshal reverted to the Crown. However his widow continued to be known as the Countess Marshal. In 1371, decades after her own death, she was referred to in the will of Sir Walter Manny as 'Alice de Hainault, the Countess Marshal'. Manny endowed the Charterhouse in London as a Carthusian monastery, requesting the monks to pray for the souls of himself, his wife Margaret, Duchess of Norfolk, and Alice of Hainault, among others.

Alice remained a widow for the rest of her life. Shortly after her husband's death, she wrote to the Lord Chancellor requesting that 'for God's and charity's sake' one of Norfolk's long-standing clerks receive the ecclesiastical preferment he had been promised. In 1309 she intended a pilgrimage to Santiago de Compostela, and was granted protection for a year for that purpose.

In the spring of 1310 the pirate John Crabbe seized a ship carrying cloth, jewels, gold, silver and other goods worth £2000 belonging to the Countess. As revealed in a letter of complaint from Edward II to Robert III, Count of Flanders, dated 29 May 1310, the ship was in the Strait of Dover, bound for London, when it was attacked by Crabbe, then master of the De la Mue. Although the King sent further letters to the Count, Crabbe was not brought to justice. In 1315, some of Crabbe's men were punished, but no restitution had been made, in consequence of which Edward II ordered the seizure of Flemish ships and goods in London to compensate the Countess.

Alice of Hainault died 26 October 1317. She is said to have left a will. In 1333 John de Framlingham, rector of Kelsale, established a chantry at Campsey Priory in Suffolk for a chaplain and two assistants to pray for the Countess' soul, out of his lands at Carlton, Suffolk.
