= John of Beaumont =

Dutch nobleman

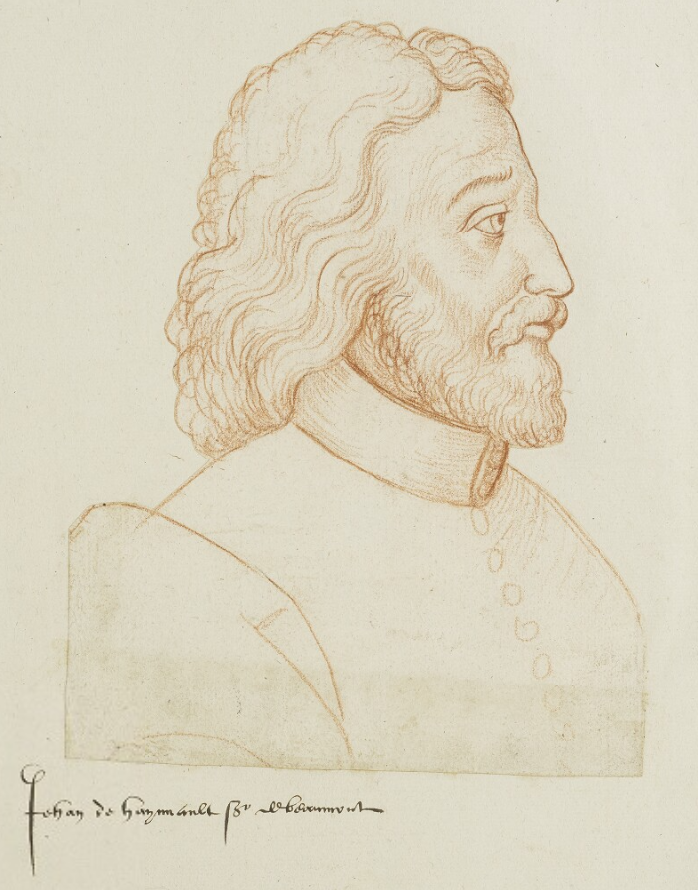
- Born: c. 1288
- Died: 11 March 1356
- Noble family: House of Avesnes
- Spouse: Margaret of Soissons
- Issue: Jeanne of Hainault; John, Canon of Cambrai; William, Canon of Cambrai, Beauvais and Le Mans; Amalrik, Canon of Cambrai, Dole and Tours; Reinout, Canon of Cambrai; unknown bastard son
- Father: John II of Holland
- Mother: Philippa of Luxembourg

John of Beaumont (1288 – 11 March 1356) was a younger brother of count William III of Holland. He was the lord of Beaumont and count of Soissons by virtue of his marriage.

== Life ==
He was born in 1288 as John of Hainault, 4th son of John II, Count of Holland and Philippa of Luxembourg. He was the brother of William I of Hainault (III of Holland) and Alice of Hainault, among others.

When his uncle John I, Count of Holland died in 1299, he left behind no descendants. As a result, his father inherited the county of Holland and Zeeland as John II, Count of Holland through his mother Adelaide of Holland. From then on Hainault and Holland were in a personal union. John of Hainault bought the heerlijkheid (comparably to the English Barony) of Beaumont, located in the southern Netherlands, for his son.

Count John II of Holland died in 1304 and was succeeded by his eldest son William III of Holland. On 21 June 1308, John received from his brother all the possessions of Gerard van Velsen, Willem van Zanden and Gerard Craaitenhout. This included the heerlijkheid Noordwijk and Beverwijk. On 23 July 1313 Noordwijk and Beverwijk were raised to hoge heerlijkheid (literally: high barony), which placed them amongst the most important fiefs in Holland. In 1316 John became lord of Tholen. Goes also came into his possession after it was taken from the Borssele family. His most important residences were Beaumont and the castle of Schoonhoven in the southern Netherlands. In 1340 he founded a Carmelite monastery in Schoonhoven.

John married Margaret of Soissons, which gave him the title of Count of Soissons. John and Margaret had five children:

- Jeanne of Hainault, married first to Louis II, Count of Blois, (three sons), and second to William I, Marquis of Namur, no issue
- John, Canon of Cambrai
- William, Canon of Cambrai, Beauvais and Le Mans
- Amalrik, Canon of Cambrai, Dole and Tours
- Reinout, Canon of Cambrai.

John often replaced his absent brother as governor of Holland. In 1326 he led an expedition to England, through which king Edward II of England was driven out and replaced by king Edward III. In 1340 he was regent of Holland and Zeeland for his nephew, count William IV of Holland for a short time. In 1345 he led an expedition to Friesland together with William IV. At the battle of Warns William IV was killed by the frisians while John of Beaumont barely managed to escape. He claimed the right of succession to the three counties, but eventually the succession was awarded to the sister of count William IV. As a result, John left the Netherlands and travelled to France, and he was present at the Battle of Crecy. Here his son-in-law Louis II, Count of Blois was killed. This made his grandson John II, Count of Blois heir to the expensive possessions in Holland and Zeeland. Afterwards John resided at the court of Margaret of Burgundy.

John had a bastard son for whom he bought the heerlijkheid Treslong in Picardie. From this son descended the Bloys of Treslong.

He died on 11 March 1356.

== Bloys of Treslong ==
Bloys of Treslong is a family that descended from a bastard son of John of Beaumont. The Bloys' of Treslong included four flag-officers in the Dutch marine.

- Willem Bloys van Treslong (1529–1594), a captain of the Gueux de mer
- Jacob Arnout Bloys of Treslong (1756–1826), also called Jacob Arnold Bastingius, was a Secretary-General of the Dutch Navy
- Johan Arnold Bloys of Treslong (1757–1824). Schout-bij-nacht at the Battle of Kamperduin.
- Jhr. William Otto Bloys of Treslong (1765–1837), an uncle of Johan Arnold.
- Cornelius Ysaac Bloys of Treslong (1763–1826) made it to Captain in the Batavian and Royal Dutch Navy

Ships named after Bloys of Treslong include

- HNLMS Bloys van Treslong, a Dutch frigate of the Kortenaer class.

== Ancestry ==
Ancestors of John of Beaumont

16. James of Avesnes
8. Bouchard IV of Avesnes
17. Adela of Guise
4. John I of Avesnes
18. Baldwin I of Constantinople
9. Margaret II, Countess of Flanders
19. Marie of Champagne
2. John II, Count of Holland
20. William I of Holland
10. Floris IV, Count of Holland
21. Adelaide of Guelders
5. Adelaide of Holland
22. Henry I, Duke of Brabant
11. Matilde of Brabant
23. Mathilde of Flanders
1. John of Beaumont
24. Henry III of Limburg
12. Waleran III of Limburg
25. Sophia of Saarbrücken
6. Henry V of Luxembourg
26. Henry IV of Luxembourg
13. Ermesinda of Luxembourg
27. Agnes of Guelders
3. Philippa of Luxembourg
28. Theobald I, Count of Bar
14. Henry II, Count of Bar
29. Ermesinde of Bar-sur-Seine
7. Margaret of Bar
30. Robert II, Count of Dreux
15. Philippa of Dreux
31. Youlande de Coucy

== In fiction ==
John is a character in Les Rois maudits (The Accursed Kings), a series of French historical novels by Maurice Druon. He was portrayed by Igor Tyczka in the 1972 French miniseries adaptation of the series.

Sir John of Hainault is a character in Edward II, a play by Christopher Marlowe.
