= List of people from Barrow-in-Furness =

This is a list of notable people who were born in or have been residents of the town of Barrow-in-Furness, Cumbria, England. The demonym of Barrow is Barrovian.

== Entertainment ==
=== Music ===
- Aim – musician, DJ and record producer
- Grian Chatten – musician, lead singer of post-punk band Fontaines D.C. was born in Barrow-in-Furness
- Glenn Cornick – former bass player in the rock band Jethro Tull
- Ken Lemon – country musician
- Thomas Round – retired singer and actor
- Chris While – songwriter, singer and musician
- Kellie While – singer-songwriter
- The Yage Letters – band based in Barrow

=== Arts ===
- James Cranke – portrait painter
- John Duffy – medical historian and writer
- A. Harry Griffin – journalist and mountaineer
- Richard Gross – sculptor
- Henry Robinson Hall – landscape painter
- Clifford Last – sculptor, son of Nella Last
- Allan Campbell McLean – writer and political activist
- Richard Howard Penton – marine and landscape painter
- George Romney – painter and early member of the famed Romney family, was born in Dalton and raised in Ormsgill
- Constance Spry – author and florist
- Keith Tyson – artist and Turner Prize winner, was born in Ulverston and educated in Dalton and Barrow

=== Television ===
- Blake Butler – television actor
- Steve Dixon – presenter for GB News
- Nigel Kneale – film and television scriptwriter
- Dave Myers – biker turned TV chef
- Jeffrey Perry – television actor
- Peter Purves – actor and television presenter who lived and worked in Barrow when he began his acting career
- Karen Taylor – television comedian

== Sport ==
=== Football ===
- Wayne Curtis – Barrow AFC striker
- Ben Davies – Preston North End, Liverpool F.C. and Rangers F.C. defender
- Neil Doherty – Watford, Birmingham City, Northampton Town and Kidderminster Harriers winger
- Keith Eddy – Watford, Sheffield United and New York Cosmos player
- Harry Hadley – professional footballer and football manager
- Emlyn Hughes – England defender, England Captain and Liverpool captain
- Doug MacFarlane – Tottenham Hotspur forward
- Billy McAdams – Manchester City and Barrow A.F.C. striker
- Ian McDonald – midfielder for seven English teams between 1971 and 1988
- Frank McPherson – Barrow A.F.C., Manchester United and Watford F.C forward
- Vic Metcalfe – Sunderland A.F.C. centre back
- Jim Parker – Burnley and Bradford Park Avenue defender
- Jack Pelter – Huddersfield Town and Hull City midfielder
- Harry Roberts – England forward
- Gary Stevens – England and Everton defender
- Ron Suart – former English football player and manager (most notably of Chelsea)
- George Thomason – midfielder for Bolton Wanderers
- Albert Tomkin – former outside left player for Tottenham Hotspur
- David Walders – former defender for Barrow, Burnley and Oldham Athletic
- Jack Walders – former winger for Barrow, Burnley and Oldham Athletic
- Fred Walker – footballer and former manager of Huddersfield Town
- Jason Walker – current York striker; former player for Dundee, Greenock Morton and Morecambe
- Ron Staniforth – footballer for England, Sheffield Wednesday and Barrow
- Georgia Stanway – footballer for England and Bayern Munich

=== Rugby league ===
- Paul Crarey – former Barrow Raiders and Whitehaven coach
- Ade Gardner – Barrow Raiders and St. Helens winger
- Mat Gardner – rugby league player, who currently plays for the Huddersfield Giants Matt has now moved to Salford Giants
- Ben Harrison – Warrington Wolves player and Ireland international
- Liam Harrison – Barrow Raiders player and Ireland international
- Willie Horne – Great Britain stand-off and Barrow Raiders rugby football captain
- Phil Jackson – Canadian former professional rugby league footballer
- Jimmy Lewthwaite – rugby league winger for Barrow and Great Britain, inducted in Barrow Hall of fame alongside Willie Horn and Phil Jackson
- Jacques O'Neill – rugby league player for Castleford Tigers, also known for participating in TV series Love Island

=== Motor sport ===
- Adam Roynon – motorcyclist – speedway rider

=== Cricket ===
- George Bigg – cricketer
- Stuart Horne – cricketer
- Liam Livingstone – cricketer, England white ball cricket international and captain of Lancashire County Cricket Club
- John Iberson – cricketer
- Mike Burns – cricketer, captain of Somerset County Cricket Club
- Len Wilkinson – cricketer

=== Other sports ===
- Caroline Alexander – cross country mountain biker, road cyclist and two time Olympian
- Kenneth A. Bray – sports teacher and member of the Hawaii Sports Hall of Fame
- Liam Conroy – light-heavyweight boxer
- Bobby Taylor – all-star Canadian Football League player and professional ice hockey player

== Academia ==
- Kenneth Neill Cameron (1908–1994) – literary scholar
- William Eccles – physicist and pioneer in the development of radio communication
- Brian Fender – academic executive
- Thomas Fresh – pioneer of environmental health and Liverpool's first public health officer
- Pat Hudson – professor emeritus of History at the University of Cardiff
- Kenneth L. Johnson – engineering professor
- Norman H. Joy – ornithologist and coleopterist
- Winifred Pennington – limnologist and biologist
- John Strong – educationalist
- Rick Turner – archaeologist
- Kathryn Warner – historian and author

== Miscellaneous ==
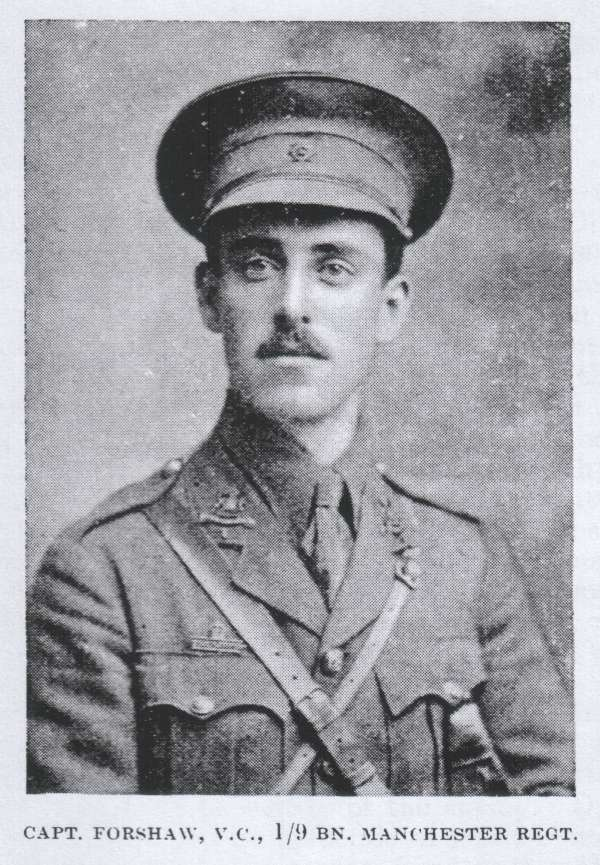
William Thomas Forshaw

- William Black, Baron Black – chair of various coach building companies
- Chris Blackhurst – editor of The Independent
- Elsie Blundell – member of Parliament for Heywood and Middleton North
- Ernest Radcliffe Bond – soldier and Metropolitan Police officer
- George Glover Campbell – Australian politician
- Victor Chavez – current (2020) chief executive of Thales UK
- Gordon Fallows – Church of England bishop
- Maurice Flitcroft – amateur golfer and a hoaxer
- William Thomas Forshaw – British Army officer, recipient of the Victoria Cross
- Tom Hollywood – trade unionist
- Nella Last – published wartime diarist
- Rosalind Mitchell – politician
- Stuart McMillan – Scottish politician
- Hazel Newberry – professional dancer
- Charles Oldham – Australian politician
- Brian Orrell – trade unionist
- Derek Pattinson – secretary general of the General Synod of the Church of England
- James Ramsden -–industrialist and key figure in founding of Barrow
- Nikhil Rathi – chief executive of the Financial Conduct Authority
- Sir Leonard Redshaw – shipbuilder
- Dame Stella Rimington – director-general (DG) of MI5 1992–1996
- Henry Schneider – industrialist and key figure in founding of Barrow
- Cat Smith – member of Parliament for Lancaster and Fleetwood
- William Sykes – clergyman
- Frank Taylor – sports journalist
- John Tovey – restaurateur
- Dame Emma Walmsley – former CEO of GSK plc
- Eleanor Williams – made false claims about getting raped by an Asian "grooming gang"

== Fictional characters ==
- Álvaro de Campos – heteronym created by Fernando Pessoa
- Charles Parker – detective in the Lord Peter Wimsey stories by Dorothy L. Sayers
