= William of Exeter =

William of Exeter may refer to:

- William of Exeter (fl. 1320–40) English author
- William of Exeter (died 1365), English writer
- William of Exeter (physician), physician to Queen Philippa, Queen consort of King Edward III of England
