= Mary of Avesnes =

French noblewoman (1280–1354)

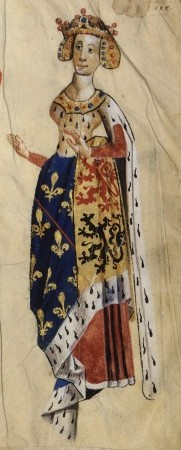
- Mary of Avesnes
- Born: 1280; Valenciennes, Nord, France
- Died: 1354 (aged 73–74); France
- Spouse: Louis I, Duke of Bourbon (m. 1310; died 1341)
- Issue Detail: Peter I, Duke of Bourbon; Jeanne; Marguerite; Marie of Bourbon; James I, Count of La Marche
- House: Avesnes
- Father: John II, Count of Holland
- Mother: Philippa of Luxembourg

Marie of Hainaut (1280 – 1354) was the daughter of John II, Count of Holland, and Philippa of Luxembourg. Her brother was William I, Count of Hainaut.

== Family ==
Her nieces by her brother William were Margaret II, Countess of Hainaut, who married Holy Roman Emperor Louis IV, and Philippa of Hainault, Queen of England, who married Edward III and was the mother of nine surviving children, including Edward, the Black Prince, father of Richard II, and John of Gaunt, father of Henry IV, the founder of the House of Lancaster.

== Life ==
In 1310 Mary married Louis I, Duke of Bourbon, son of Robert, Count of Clermont and Beatrix of Bourbon. They had eight children together:

1. Peter I, Duke of Bourbon (1311–1356), killed at the Battle of Poitiers
2. Jeanne (1312–1402), married in 1324 Guigues VII, Count of Forez
3. Marguerite (1313–1362), married on July 6, 1320, Jean II de Sully, married in 1346 Hutin de Vermeilles
4. Marie of Bourbon (1315–1387, Naples), married first in Nicosia in January 1330 Guy of Lusignan (d. 1343), titular Prince of Galilee, married second on September 9, 1347, Robert of Taranto, the titular Latin Emperor. Only her first marriage produced surviving children.
5. Philip (1316 – aft. 1327)
6. James (1318)
7. James I, Count of La Marche (1319 – 1362), killed at the Battle of Brignais
8. Beatrice of Bourbon, Queen of Bohemia (1320 – December 23, 1383, Danvillers), married first at Vincennes in 1334 John of Luxembourg, King of Bohemia, as his second wife, married herself second, c. 1347, Eudes II of Grancey (d. 1389)

== Sources ==
- Griffiths, Quentin (1993). "The Nesles of Picardy in the Service of the Last Capetians". Francia. 20 No. 1: 69–78.
