= William I of Hainaut =

Count of Hainaut from 1304 to 1337

William the Good
- Count of Hainaut, Holland, and Zeeland
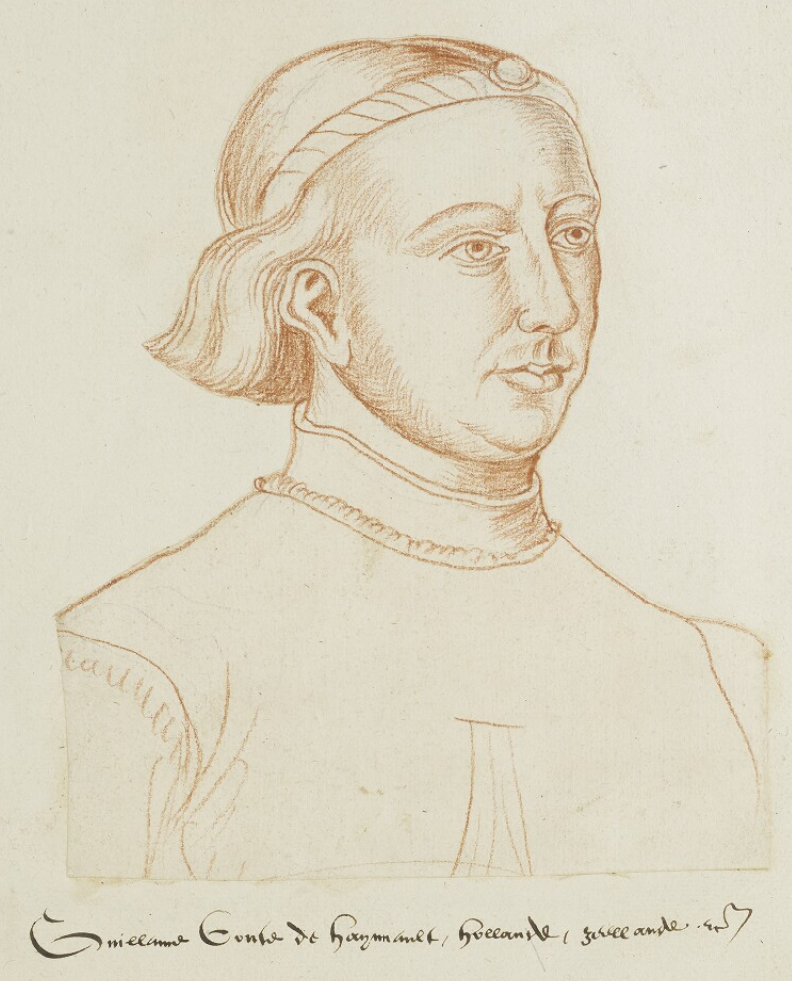
- 16th-century depiction
- Born: c. 1286
- Died: 7 June 1337; Valenciennes
- Noble family: House of Avesnes
- Spouse: Joan of Valois
- Issue: William II, Count of Hainaut; Margaret, Holy Roman Empress; Philippa, Queen of England; Joanna, Duchess of Jülich; Isabella of Hainaut
- Father: John II, Count of Hainaut
- Mother: Philippa of Luxembourg

William the Good (Dutch: Willem, French: Guillaume; c. 1286 – 7 June 1337) was count of Hainaut (as William I), Avesnes, Holland (as William III), and Zeeland (as William II) from 1304 to his death.

== Career ==
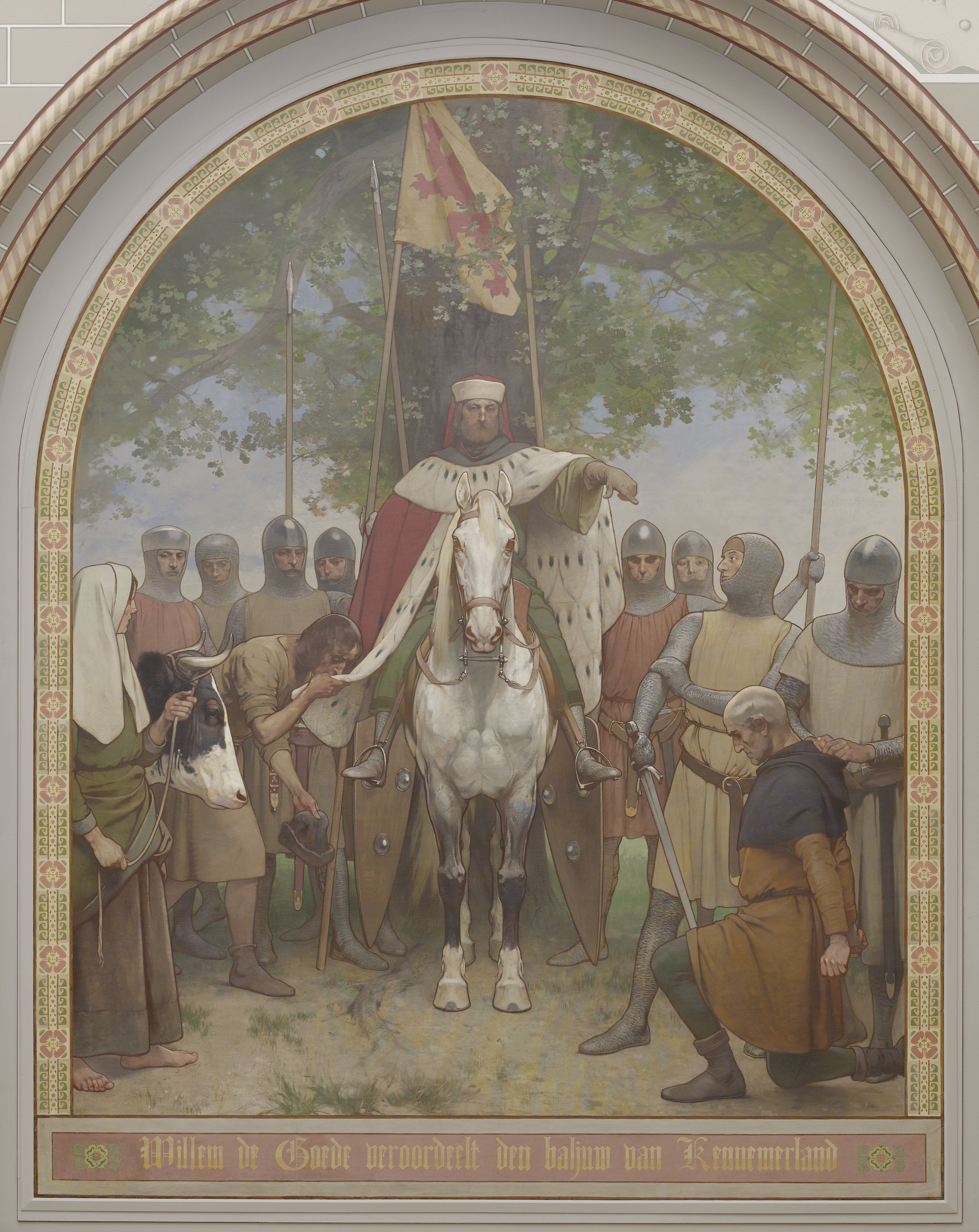
William the Good sentencing the bailiff of Kennemerland

William, born c. 1286, was the son of John II, Count of Hainaut, and Philippa, daughter of Henry V, Count of Luxembourg. He was the brother of John of Beaumont and Alice of Hainault.

William was originally not expected to become count. After the deaths of his elder brothers, John (killed at Kortrijk in 1302) and Henry (d. 1303), he became heir apparent to his father's counties.

Prior to becoming count, he was defeated by Guy of Namur at the battle on the island of Duiveland in 1304. Guy and Duke John II of Brabant then conquered most of Zeeland and Holland, but these territories were recovered again when William became the new count in the same year. William continued the war with Flanders until the Peace of Paris in 1323, during which the Count of Flanders renounced all claims on Zeeland. William, in turn, gained all of Zeeland but agreed to renounce all claims on Imperial Flanders. William had occupied most of the Bishopric of Utrecht and tried to conquer Friesland but was repelled by Hessel Martena. At the death of his uncle, Guy d'Avesnes, Bishop of Utrecht, William took his fief of Amsterdam and annexed it to Holland.

Many of his daughters married with important rulers of Europe; King Edward III of England and Holy Roman Emperor Louis IV were married to his daughters, while he was married to the sister of the King Philip VI of France. With these important alliances William gained considerable influence and respect, which he used to advance the interests of his counties.

== Family ==
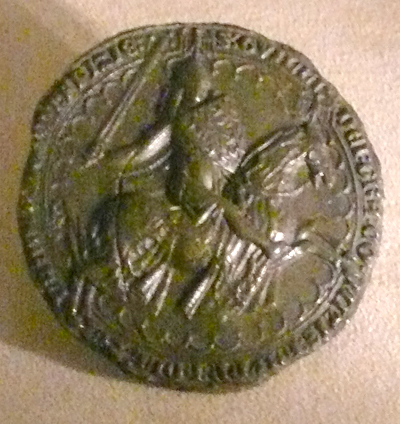
Seals of William I

On 19 May 1305 William married Joan of Valois, sister of the future king Philip VI of France, and had the following children:

- William II, Count of Hainaut (1307–1345)
- John (died 1316)
- Margaret II, Countess of Hainault (1311–1356), married Louis IV, Holy Roman Emperor
- Philippa of Hainault (c. 1313–1369), married King Edward III of England
- Agnes (died 1327)
- Joanna of Hainaut (1312–1374), married William V, Duke of Jülich
- Isabelle of Hainaut (1323–1361), married Robert of Namur
- Louis (1325–1328)

William had an illegitimate son who was later knighted: Jan Aelman (1320–1389)

== Ancestors ==
Ancestors of William I of Hainaut

4. John I of Avesnes
2. John II, Count of Holland
5. Adelaide of Holland
1. William I, Count of Hainaut
6. Henry V of Luxembourg
3. Philippa of Luxembourg
7. Margaret of Bar

== See also ==
- Counts of Hainaut family tree
- Counts of Holland family tree

William I of Hainaut House of Avesnes Born: c. 1286 Died: 7 June 1337
Preceded by John II	Count of Hainaut, Holland and Zeeland; 1304–1337	Succeeded by William II
