= List of people from Cumbria =

This is a list of people from Cumbria, a county in North West England. The demonym of Cumbria is Cumbrian. This list is arranged alphabetically by surname.

- Sir John Barrow (1764-1848), geographer, linguist and explorer
- William Norman Birkett (1883-1962), deputy British judge at the Nuremberg trials
- John Cunliffe (1933-2018), children's book author and TV presenter, creator of Postman Pat
- John Dalton (1766-1844), father of the atomic theory in science
- Troy Donockley (born 1964), musician
- William Eccles (physicist) (1875-1966), physicist and pioneer of radio communication
- Gordon Fallows (1913-1979), Church of England bishop
- Sheila Fell (1931-1979), artist
- Thomas Fresh (1803-1861), pioneer in environmental health
- Percy Kelly (artist) (1918-1993), artist
- Robin Philipson (1916-1992), prominent artist
- Beatrix Potter (1866-1943), children's literature author and illustrator
- James Ramsden, industrialist, managing director of the Furness Railway and founder of Barrow-in-Furness
- Jancis Robinson (born 1950), wine critic and journalist
- George Romney (1734-1802), portrait painter
- Eddie Stobart (1929-2024), businessman
- John Wilkinson (industrialist) (1728-1808), pioneer of cast iron manufacturing
- Theodora Wilson Wilson (1865-1941), writer, pacifist and founder of the Women's International League for Peace and Freedom
- William Wordsworth (1770-1850), Romantic poet and Poet Laureate

== See also ==
- List of people from Barrow-in-Furness
- List of people from Carlisle
