= Isabelle of Luxembourg =

Countess consort of Flanders (c. 1247–1298)

- Seal of Isabelle, 1290
- Born: c. 1247
- Died: c. 1298
- Spouse: Guy of Dampierre
- Issue: Beatrix; Margaret; Isabelle; Philippa; John I, Marquis of Namur; Guy of Namur; Henry; Jeanne
- House: Luxembourg
- Father: Henry V of Luxembourg
- Mother: Margaret of Bar

Isabelle of Luxembourg (c. 1247–1298) was a countess consort of Flanders and a marquise consort of Namur by marriage to Guy of Dampierre.

== Life ==
She was the daughter of Henry V of Luxembourg and Margaret of Bar. Isabelle was a member of the House of Luxembourg. Isabelle was the third of seven children.

=== Marriage ===
In March 1265, Isabelle married Guy of Dampierre. Her marriage was determined by events that occurred many years before her birth. Indeed, around 1165, her great-grandfather Henry IV the Blind, Count of Namur and Luxembourg, had no children from his first marriage. He named his brother Baldwin IV of Hainaut as his successor, but Baldwin died in 1171, and Henry the Blind then confirmed his nephew Baldwin V of Hainaut. But with one more attempt to have children, Henry married his second wife, Agnes of Gelderland, who bore a daughter, Ermesinde and thus had broken the promise he had made to Baldwin. A war ensued, with the result that Baldwin would be Henry's designated heir in Namur.

Isabelle's father claimed his rights of Namur, being the son of Ermesinde. Henry V failed on his claim to rule Namur. Isabelle's parents wanted to make peace with Guy over a dispute of Namur. Isabelle became Guy's second wife; his first wife, Matilda had died one year earlier. Guy already had eight children with Matilda.

Guy arranged a marriage between their daughter Philippa and Edward, Prince of Wales. However, Philip IV of France imprisoned Guy and two of his sons, forced him to call off the marriage, and imprisoned Philippa in Paris until her death in 1306. Guy was summoned before the king again in 1296, and the principal cities of Flanders were taken under royal protection until Guy paid an indemnity and surrendered his territories, to hold them at the grace of the king.

Isabelle died in September 1298, and her husband died six years later, in 1304.

== Issue ==
Guy and Isabelle had:

- Beatrix (d. 1307), married c. 1287 Hugh II of Châtillon
- Margaret (d. 1331), married (1) on 14 November 1282 at Roxburgh Alexander of Scotland (son of Alexander III of Scotland), married (2) on 3 July 1286 in Namur Reginald I of Guelders
- Isabelle (d. 1323), married 1307 Jean de Fiennes, Lord of Tingry and Chatelain of Bourbourg. Mother of Robert de Fiennes, Constable of France.
- Philippa (d. 1306, Paris)
- John I, Marquis of Namur (1267–1330)
- Guy of Namur (d. 1311), Lord of Ronse, sometime Count of Zeeland
- Henry (d. 6 November 1337), Count of Lodi, married January 1309 Margaret of Cleves and had issue
- Jeanne (d. 1296), a nun at Flines Abbey

== Sources ==
- Arblaster, Paul (2012). A History of the Low Countries. Palgrave Macmillan.
- Fegley, Randall (2002). The Golden Spurs of Kortrijk: How the Knights of France Fell to the Foot Soldiers of Flanders in 1302. McFarland & Co.
- Pollock, M.A. (2015). Scotland, England and France After the Loss of Normandy, 1204-1296. The Boydell Press.
- Verbruggen, J. F. (2002). DeVries, Kelly (ed.). The Battle of the Golden Spurs (Courtrai, 11 July 1302). Translated by Ferguson, David Richard. Boydell Press.
