= John Crabbe (died 1352) =

14th-century Flemish pirate

John Crabbe (before 1305 – 1352) was a Flemish merchant, pirate and soldier who was active for around 35 years of his life. He defended Berwick Castle for the Scots against English forces in 1318, but after being captured by the English in 1332 he assisted the English when they again besieged Berwick in 1333, and became a loyal servant of Edward III, for whom he also fought at the Battle of Sluys in 1340.

== Family ==
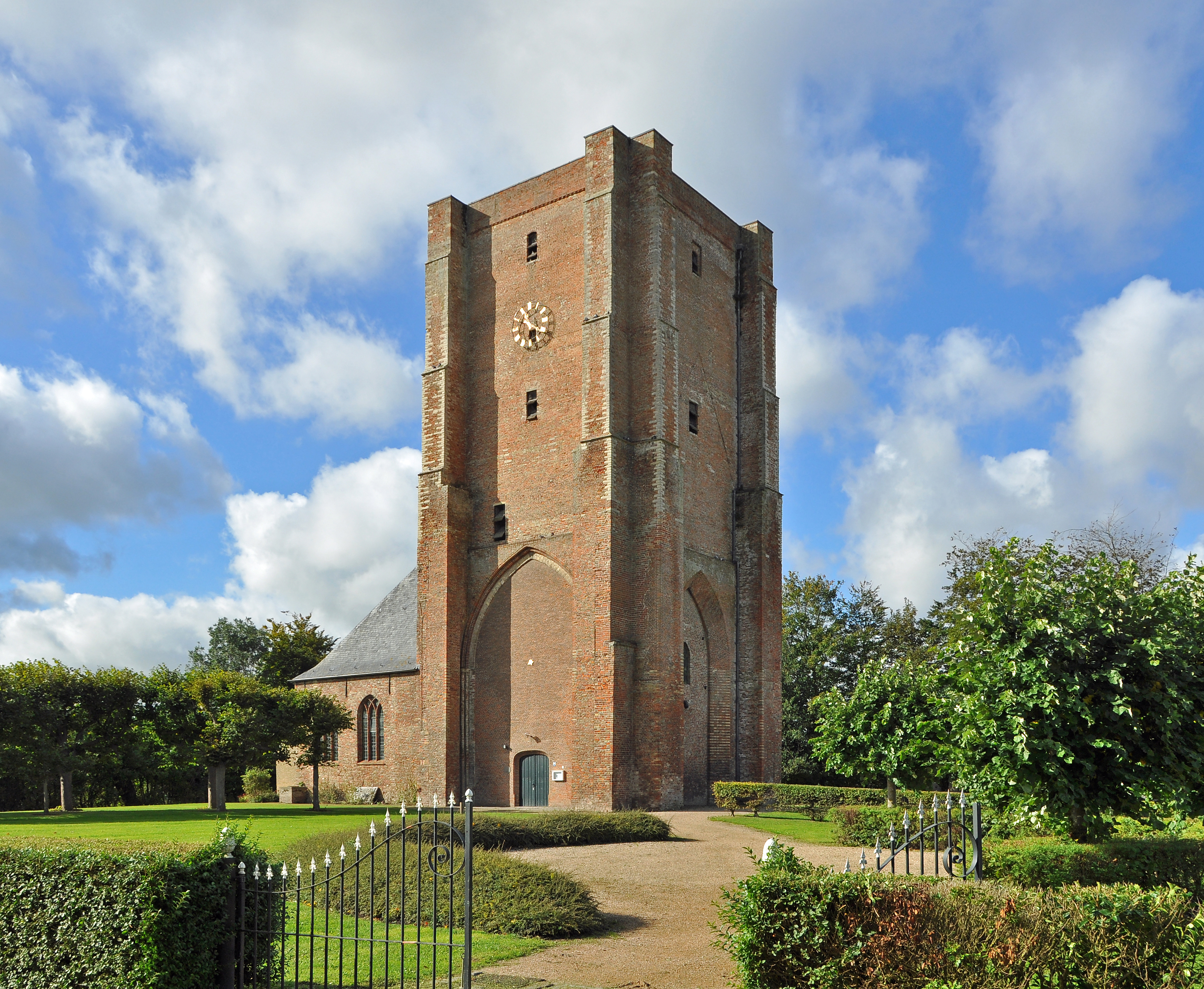
14th-century tower in Muide, where John Crabbe was born

John Crabbe was from the small town of Muide in Flanders (now Sint Anna ter Muiden in the Dutch province of Zeeland), situated on the coast near the mouth of the river Zwin, which in the fourteenth century connected Bruges, Damme and Sluis with the North Sea. He may have been an elder brother of Peter Crabbe and Baldwin Crabbe, and it is known that he had a nephew called Crabbekin.

== Early career ==
Although Crabbe probably began his career earlier, the first notice of him as a pirate is in 1305, when he attacked the Waardeboure of Dordrecht at La Rochelle in the Bay of Biscay, seizing the cargo, which included 160 tuns of wine, burning the ship, and kidnapping the sailors. According to William Gurstelle, Crabbe largely owed the success of his attack on the Waardeboure to his development of a catapult which could be fired from the deck of his ship. Since Dordrecht was under the jurisdiction of John II, Count of Holland, and the Counts of Holland and Zeeland were a "traditional enemy of Flanders", Crabbe likely considered the Waardeboure "legitimate prey". The ship's owner, one John de le Waerde (Johannis de Wardre), a Dordrecht merchant, sought damages of 2,000 livres tournois. He enlisted the help of Philip IV of France in negotiations with Robert III, Count of Flanders, but after four years Crabbe and his men had not been brought to justice. When summoned to trial they failed to appear; thus, although they were found guilty, de le Waerde was not indemnified.

Nothing further is heard of Crabbe until the spring of 1310, when he seized a ship carrying cloth, jewels, gold, silver and other goods worth £2000 which were the property of Alice of Hainault (died 26 October 1317), Countess Marshal. (Note: Alice of Hainault, second wife of Roger Bigod, 5th Earl of Norfolk, Earl Marshal. See Counts of Hainaut family tree.) As revealed in a letter of complaint from Edward II of England to Count Robert of Flanders dated 29 May 1310, the ship was in the Strait of Dover, bound for London, when it was attacked by Crabbe, then master of the De la Mue (i.e. of Mude or Muiden). Although the king sent further letters to the count, Crabbe was not brought to justice. In 1315, some of Crabbe's men were punished, but no restitution had been made, in consequence of which Edward II ordered the seizure of Flemish ships and goods in London to compensate the countess.

By this time Crabbe was apparently established in Aberdeen, where he may have had relatives. There he disputed rights to land in Cults, Cromar. Over the centuries, the name Crabbe became Craib. Craibs were farming on Strathmore, Cromar from the 1700s. According to Lucas, Flemish merchants were welcome in Scotland because of the enmity between that country and England. From there they preyed on English merchant ships, sending the plundered goods to ports in Flanders for sale. In 1311 Crabbe seized two merchant ships from Newcastle-on-Tyne bound for Flanders with a cargo of eighty-nine sacks of wool. Friends of Crabbe in Aberdeen took the wool to Flanders where it was sold. The merchants complained to Edward II, who wrote to Count Robert requesting restitution.

For the next several years, nothing is known of Crabbe's activities. However, in 1316 Flanders was ravaged by famine, and Count Robert allowed Crabbe to return, and appointed him admiral of a fleet of ships with orders to acquire food to alleviate the famine. Crabbe duly seized two ships owned by merchants of Great Yarmouth. In December of that year Crabbe seized another ship, La Bona Navis de la Strode, off the Isle of Thanet. The Bona Navis was carrying a valuable cargo of wine intended for the English market, and the king made a series of representations concerning Crabbe's plunder of it to Count Robert during the ensuing five years. Count Robert, however, in a letter of 14 November 1317, disavowed knowledge of Crabbe's whereabouts, claiming that he had been banished for murder, but that he would be punished on the wheel if found.

Crabbe was now notorious, and his deeds were mentioned by the chronicler Lodewijk van Velthem of Antwerp. He returned to Scotland, eventually settling in Berwick, where he became a burgess, and continued his attacks on English ships. In 1318–1319, when the English attempted to capture Berwick, Crabbe played an important role in the defence of the town, recorded in verse by John Barbour, author of The Bruce:

John Craby, a Flemyne, als had he,
That wes of gret subtilite.

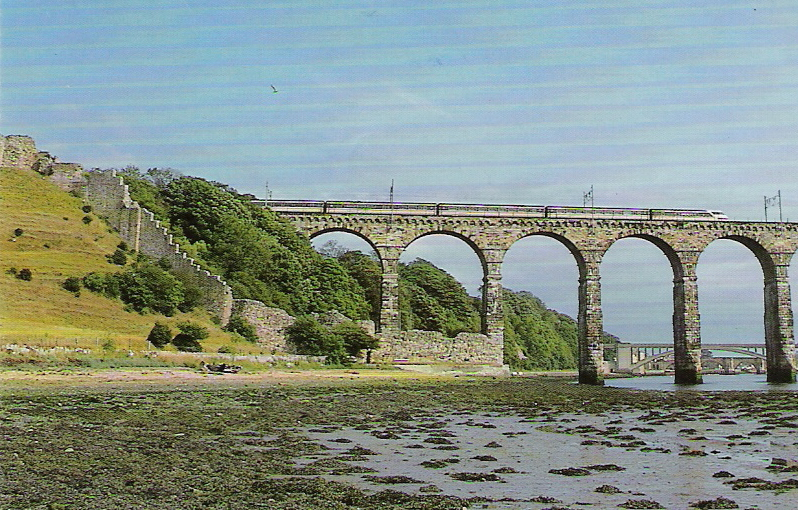
Remains of curtain wall of Berwick Castle

In 1332, war broke out again between England and Scotland, with Edward III supporting the claim of Edward Balliol (died 1363) to the Scottish throne. Balliol defeated the Scots at the Battle of Dupplin Moor, and Crabbe, who was in command of a fleet of ten Flemish ships, was also decisively defeated by English vessels in the Firth of Tay. After the battle Crabbe escaped to Berwick, but shortly thereafter was captured in a skirmish by the English soldier Walter de Manny. At the petition of an English Parliament convened at York, Edward III allowed Manny the 4,300 marks ransom to be paid by the Scots for Crabbe, and ordered that Crabbe, still a prisoner in Scotland, be kept in chains until he had made restitution for his earlier robbery of the Bona Navis. According to Lucas, Crabbe was fearful of his English captors, and succeeded in getting John Randolph, 3rd Earl of Moray, to request a safe conduct for him to the English court until Michaelmas 1333. Once Crabbe had arrived in England, Edward III determined to keep him there, and paid Manny 1,000 marks for Crabbe's ransom. The English once again besieged Berwick in the spring of 1333, and after the Scots were decisively defeated on 19 July 1333 at the Battle of Halidon Hill, they refused to ransom Crabbe from the English because, according to the Lanercost Chronicle, Crabbe had assisted Edward III at the siege of Berwick. The Scots then killed Crabbe's son. Edward III later rewarded Crabbe for his "good service in the siege of Berwick" by pardoning him of all his crimes on both land and sea, and making him Constable of Somerton Castle.

== Later years ==
In the ensuing years Crabbe was of considerable assistance to Edward III during the continuing war with Scotland. In February and March 1335 Crabbe gathered a fleet of ten ships from English ports, provisioned and manned them, and took them to sea in the king's service. He later helped strengthen the fortifications at Berwick, and in 1338 "erected engines and hoardings" for the siege of Dunbar Castle. He received payment for these services, and was referred to in documents of the period as the king's yeoman and on one occasion as the king's sergeant.

The year 1337 marked the beginning of the Hundred Years' War. According to Lucas, Edward III's strategy was to use the Low Countries as his base and to finance the war from the sale of English wool there. It was thus imperative that the sea lanes be kept free for English shipping. Crabbe was well positioned to serve the king in this task, and from 4 April to 12 August 1339 was with the Admiral of the Fleet North of the Thames, Robert de Morley, 2nd Baron Morley. During this period he is known to have been in command, at one time, of a hundred archers, and on a second occasion, of eight men-at-arms, seventy archers and seventy sailors.

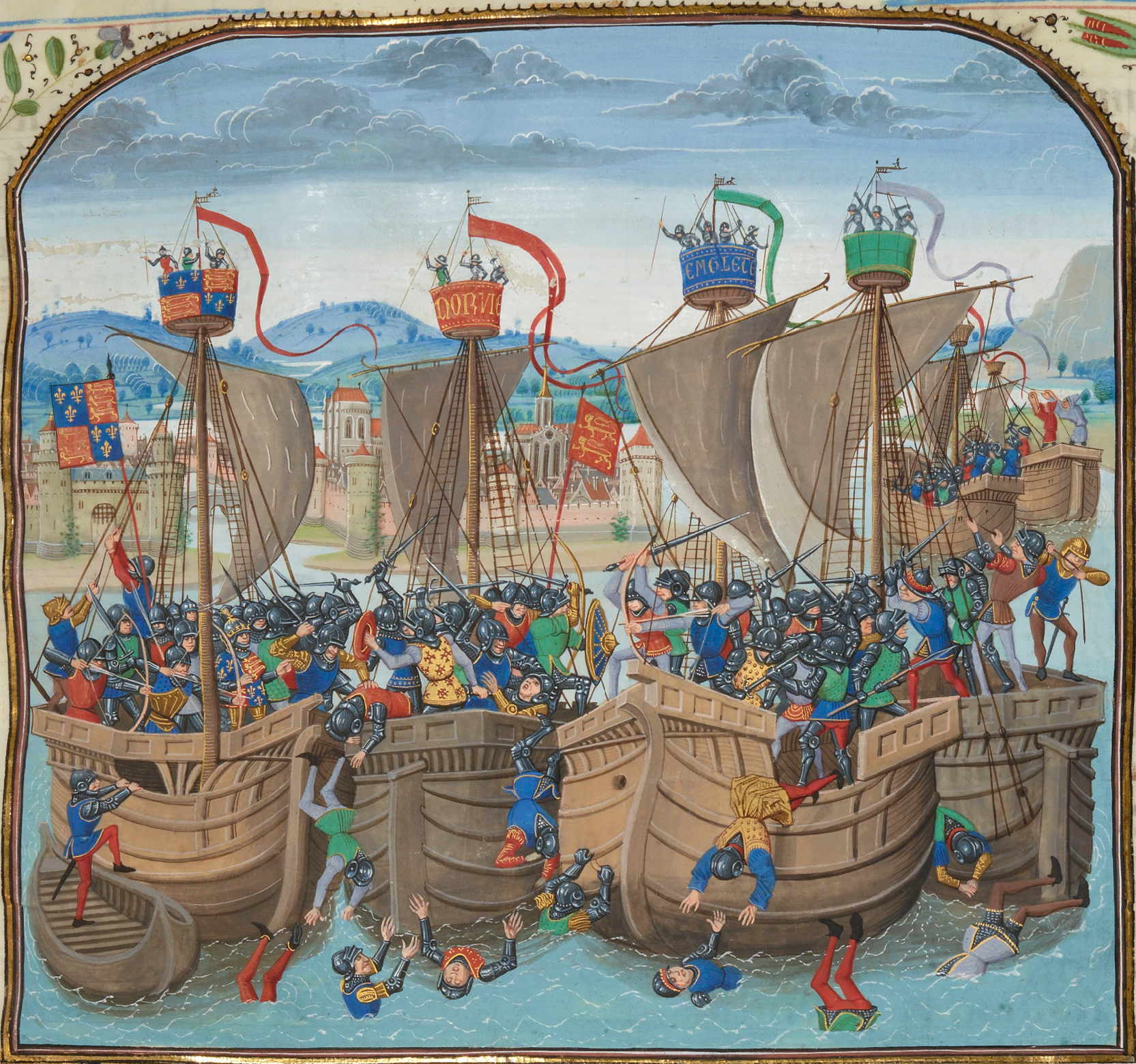
Battle of Sluys, at which John Crabbe fought, from Froissart's Chronicles

In an attempt to prevent the English from using the Low Countries as their base, Philip VI of France gathered a fleet at the mouths of the Zwin and Scheldt, and Edward III, prepared to attack immediately, met at Orwell with his council, where John de Stratford, Archbishop of Canterbury, Morley and Crabbe urged him to delay until a larger fleet could be assembled. The king did so with reluctance, and with a larger fleet engaged the French in the Battle of Sluys on the afternoon of 23 June; by the end of the day the English had virtually annihilated the enemy. A few French ships led by a pirate named Spoudevisch managed to escape, and at the king's order were pursued by Crabbe. Unfortunately whether Crabbe succeeded or failed in this endeavour is unknown. After Sluys, Crabbe may have accompanied the king to the siege of Tournai.

The war with France reduced Edward III's finances to a desperate state, and on 10 October 1341 the grant made to Crabbe in 1333 was cancelled in return for a grant to him of the custody and profits of Somerton Castle. Crabbe continued to prove useful to the king. Early in 1341 he provided timber for "engines" at the king's manor of Langley Marsh in Buckinghamshire, and made barricades at Fauxhall, and in December of that year was employed in helping to fill the empty treasury by collecting certain moneys in Nottinghamshire. After the Scottish defeat at the Battle of Neville's Cross on 17 October 1346, Edward III refused to permit prisoners taken by the English to be ransomed, and assigned their keeping to various castles throughout the realm. Crabbe was among those summoned by the council on 20 August 1347 in that regard, and was given custody of Walter de Maundeville, who until then had been imprisoned in the Tower of London.

Crabbe died in early 1352.
