= Philippa of Hainault =

Queen of England from 1328 to 1369

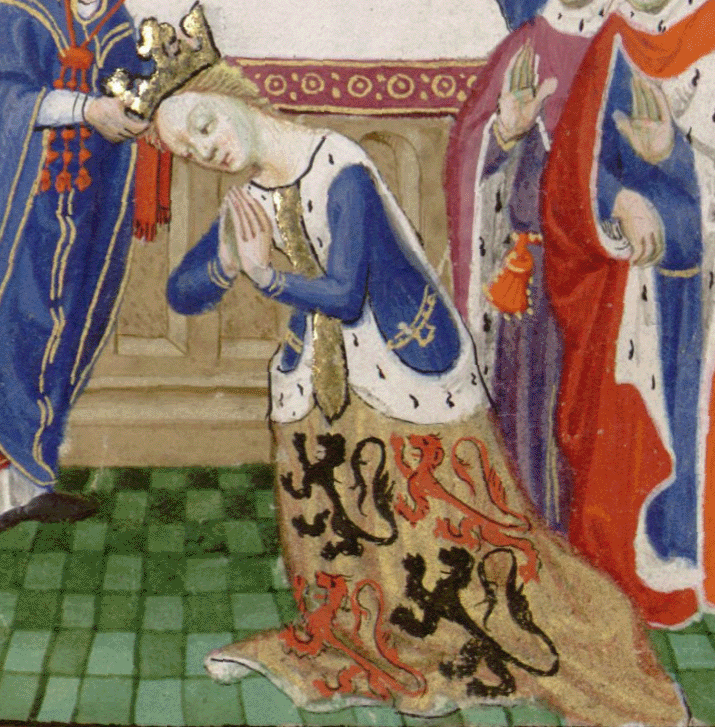
- Philippa's coronation, 15th-century illustration from Froissart's Chronicles

Queen consort of England
- Tenure: 24 January 1328 – 15 August 1369
- Coronation: 18 February 1330
- Born: 24 June 1310? (or c. 1310–1315); Valenciennes, County of Hainaut, Holy Roman Empire
- Died: 15 August 1369 (aged over 50); Windsor Castle, Berkshire, England
- Burial: 9 January 1370; Westminster Abbey
- Spouse: Edward III of England (m. 1328)
- Issue more...: Edward the Black Prince; Isabella, Countess of Bedford; Joan of England; Lionel, Duke of Clarence; John, Duke of Lancaster; Edmund, Duke of York; Mary, Duchess of Brittany; Margaret, Countess of Pembroke; Thomas, Duke of Gloucester
- House: Avesnes
- Father: William I, Count of Hainault
- Mother: Joan of Valois

Philippa of Hainault (sometimes spelled Hainaut; Middle French: Philippe de Hainaut; 24 June 1310? (in or by 1315) – 15 August 1369) was Queen of England as the wife and political adviser of King Edward III. She acted as regent in 1346, when her husband was away for the Hundred Years' War.

Daughter of William I, Count of Hainaut, and French princess Joan of Valois, Philippa was engaged to Edward, Prince of Wales, in 1326. Their marriage was celebrated in York Minster on 24 January 1328, some months after Edward's accession to the throne of England and Isabella of France's infamous invasion. After her husband took the throne, Philippa influenced King Edward to take interest in the nation's commercial expansion, was part of the successful Battle of Neville's Cross, and often went on expeditions to Scotland and France. She won much popularity with the English people for her compassion in 1347, when she successfully persuaded the King to spare the lives of the Burghers of Calais. This popularity helped maintain peace in England throughout their long reign.

== Childhood ==
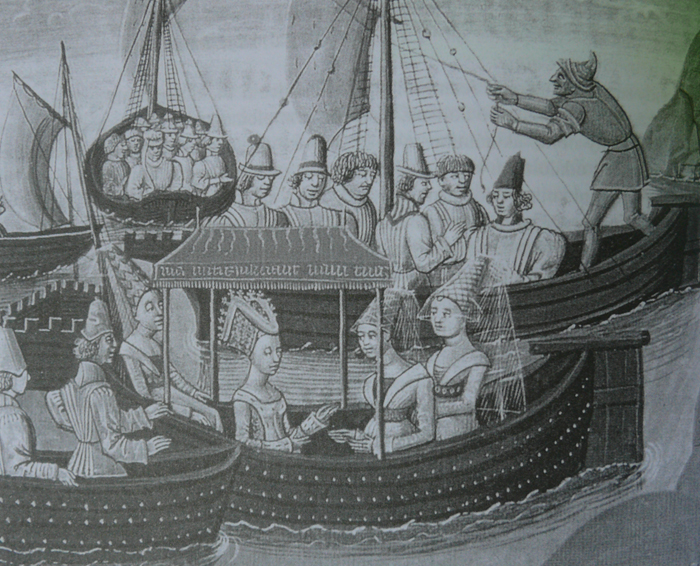
Philippa of Hainault and her family seated under the canopy

Philippa may have been born on 24 June 1310, but it is possible that she was born as late as 1315, in Valenciennes, Low Countries. She was one of eight children and the second of five daughters born to Count William I of Hainaut and Joan of Valois, granddaughter of King Philip III of France.

King Edward II of England decided that an alliance with Flanders would benefit England and sent Bishop Stapledon of Exeter on the Continent as an ambassador. On his journey, he crossed into the County of Hainaut to inspect the daughters of Count William, to determine which daughter would be the most suitable as an eventual bride for the king's son Edward. The bishop's report to the King describes one of the Count's daughters in detail. A later annotation says it describes Philippa as a child, but historian Ian Mortimer argues that it is actually an account of her older sister Margaret. The description runs:

The lady whom we saw has not uncomely hair, betwixt blue-black and brown... Her face narrows between the eyes and its lower part is more narrow than her forehead. Her eyes are blackish-brown and deep. Her nose is fairly smooth and even, save that it is somewhat broad at the tip and flattened, and yet it is no snub-nose... Her lips are full, especially the lower lip... Her lower teeth project a little beyond the upper; yet this is but little seen... All her body is well set and unmaimed; and nought is amiss so far as a man may see. Moreover, she is brown of skin all over, much like her father. And she will be of the age of nine years on St. John's day next to come, as her mother said. She is neither too tall nor too short for such an age; she is of fair carriage. The damsel is well taught in all that becometh her rank and highly esteemed and well beloved by her parents and of all her meinie, in so far as we could inquire and learn the truth. In all things, she is pleasant enough, as it seems to us.

Growing up in the Low Countries in the period when this region was growing into a major trading centre, Philippa was well versed in finances and diplomacy. Her older sister Margaret succeeded their brother, William II, upon his death in battle. The counties of Holland and Zeeland and the seigniory of Frisia were devolved to Margaret after agreement between the sisters.

Four years later, in the summer of 1326, Isabella of France, the queen of England, arrived at the court of Hainaut to seek aid from Count William in order to depose her husband, Edward II, from the throne. Her son Edward had accompanied his mother to Hainaut, where she arranged the betrothal to 13-year-old Philippa in exchange for assistance. As the couple were second cousins (as great-grandchildren of Philip III of France), a papal dispensation was required; it was sent from Pope John XXII at Avignon in September 1327. Philippa's retinue arrived in England in December, escorted by her uncle John. On 23 December, she reached London where a "rousing reception was accorded her".

== Queen of England ==
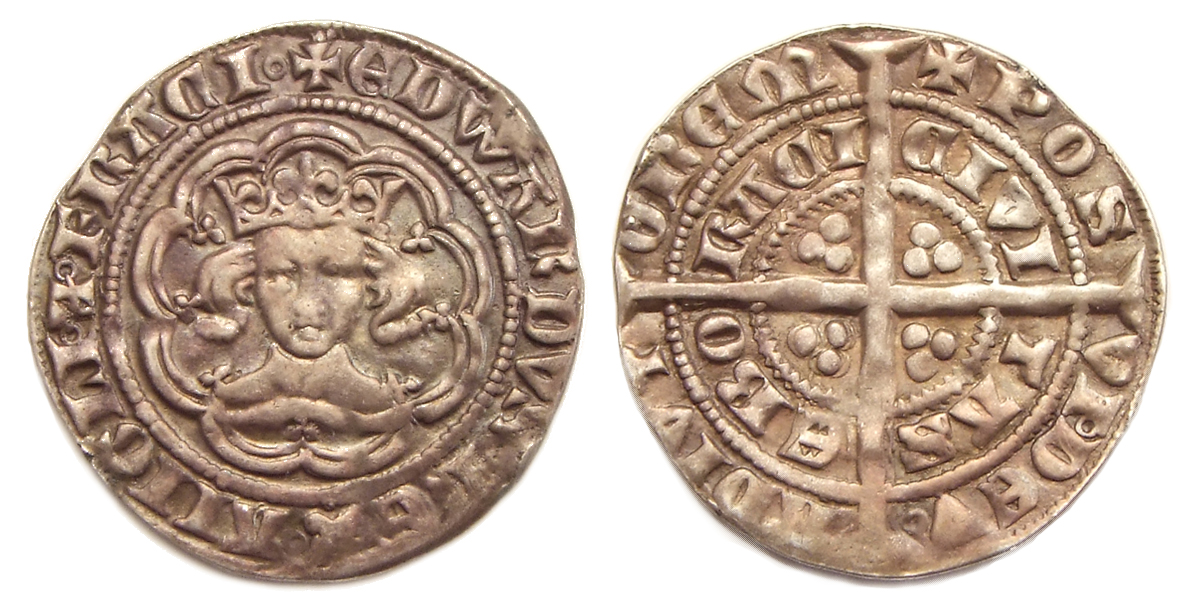
Half groat with portrait of King Edward III, York mint

=== First years ===
In October 1327, Philippa married Edward by proxy through the Bishop of Coventry in Valenciennes. The official marriage was at York Minster on 24 January 1328, eleven months after Edward's accession to the English throne; although the de facto rulers were Queen Mother Isabella and her lover, Roger Mortimer, 1st Earl of March, who jointly acted as his regents. Soon after their marriage, the couple retired to live at Woodstock Palace in Oxfordshire. Unlike many of her predecessors, Philippa did not alienate the English people by retaining her foreign retinue or bringing large numbers of foreigners to the English court. In August, her dower was fixed. She became a patron of the chronicler Jean Froissart and owned several illuminated manuscripts, one of which currently is housed in the national library in Paris. Froissart began to describe her as "The most gentle Queen, most liberal, and most courteous that ever was Queen in her days."

As Isabella did not wish to relinquish her own status, Philippa's coronation was postponed for two years. She was crowned queen on 18 February 1330 at Westminster Abbey, when she was almost five months pregnant. She gave birth to her first son, Edward, the following June. In October 1330, King Edward commenced his personal rule by staging a coup and ordering the arrest of the regents. Shortly afterward, Mortimer was executed for treason and the Queen Mother was sent to Castle Rising in Norfolk, where she spent a number of years under house arrest but with her privileges and freedom of movement eventually restored.

She was invested as a Lady of the Order of the Garter (LG) in 1358.

=== Political influence ===
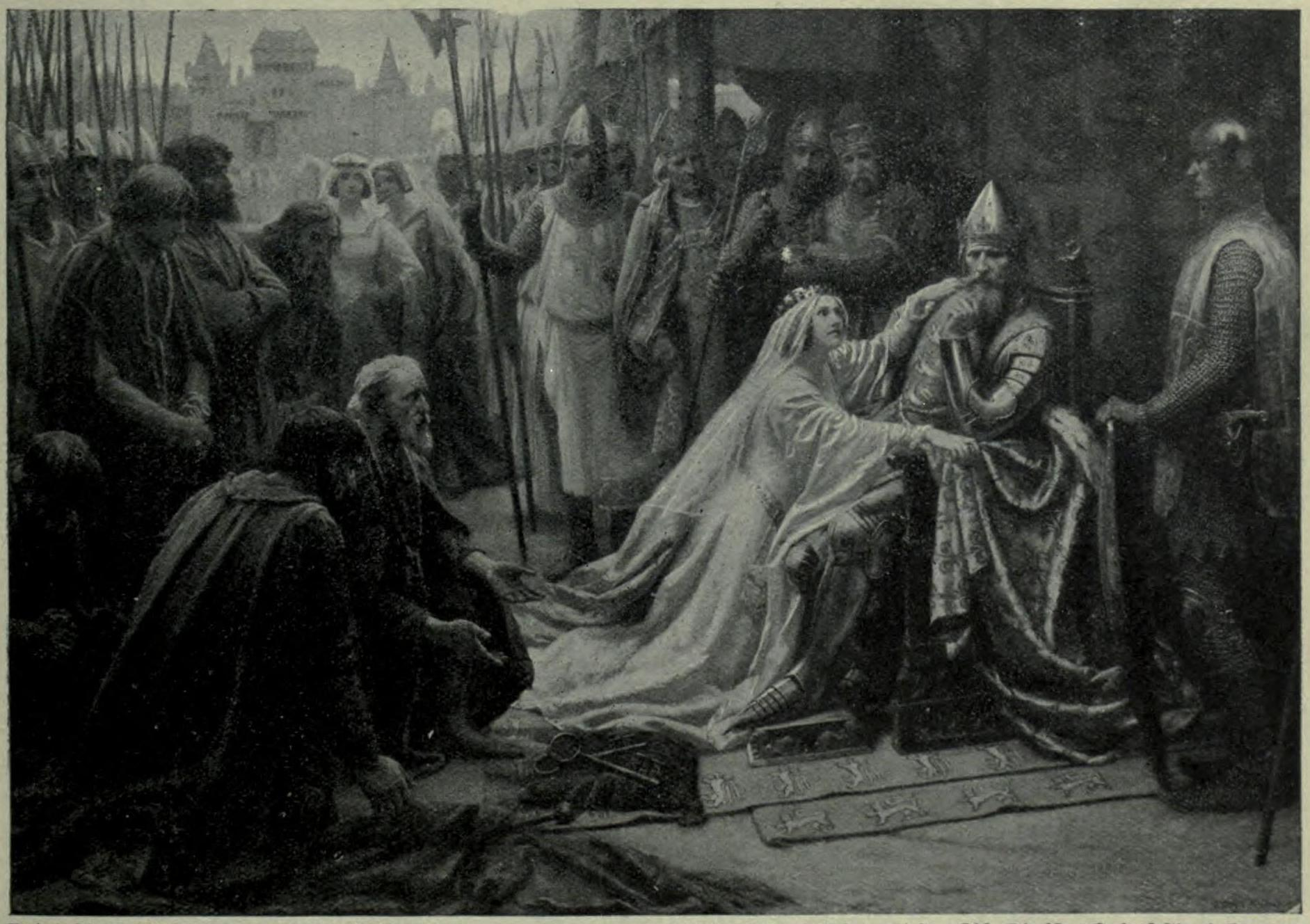
Queen Philippa interceding for the Burghers of Calais by J. Doyle Penrose

Philippa worked tirelessly for the crown, maintaining balance between royal and familial duties. She was loved and respected even in tumultuous times as the queen who managed to have a successful marriage with Edward.

As the financial demands of the recent Hundred Years' War were enormous, Philippa wisely advised the King to take interest in the nation's commercial expansion as a different method of covering the expenses. She established the textile industry in Norwich by encouraging Flemish weavers to settle there and promoted coal mining in Tynedale.

While her husband was away for the Hundred Years' War, she was appointed to serve as regent in 1346.

In 1364 or 1365, Edward III demanded the return of Hainaut and other inheritances which had been given over to the dukes of Bavaria–Straubing in the name of Philippa, but he was unsuccessful as the custom in those regions favoured male heirs.

=== Military campaigns ===
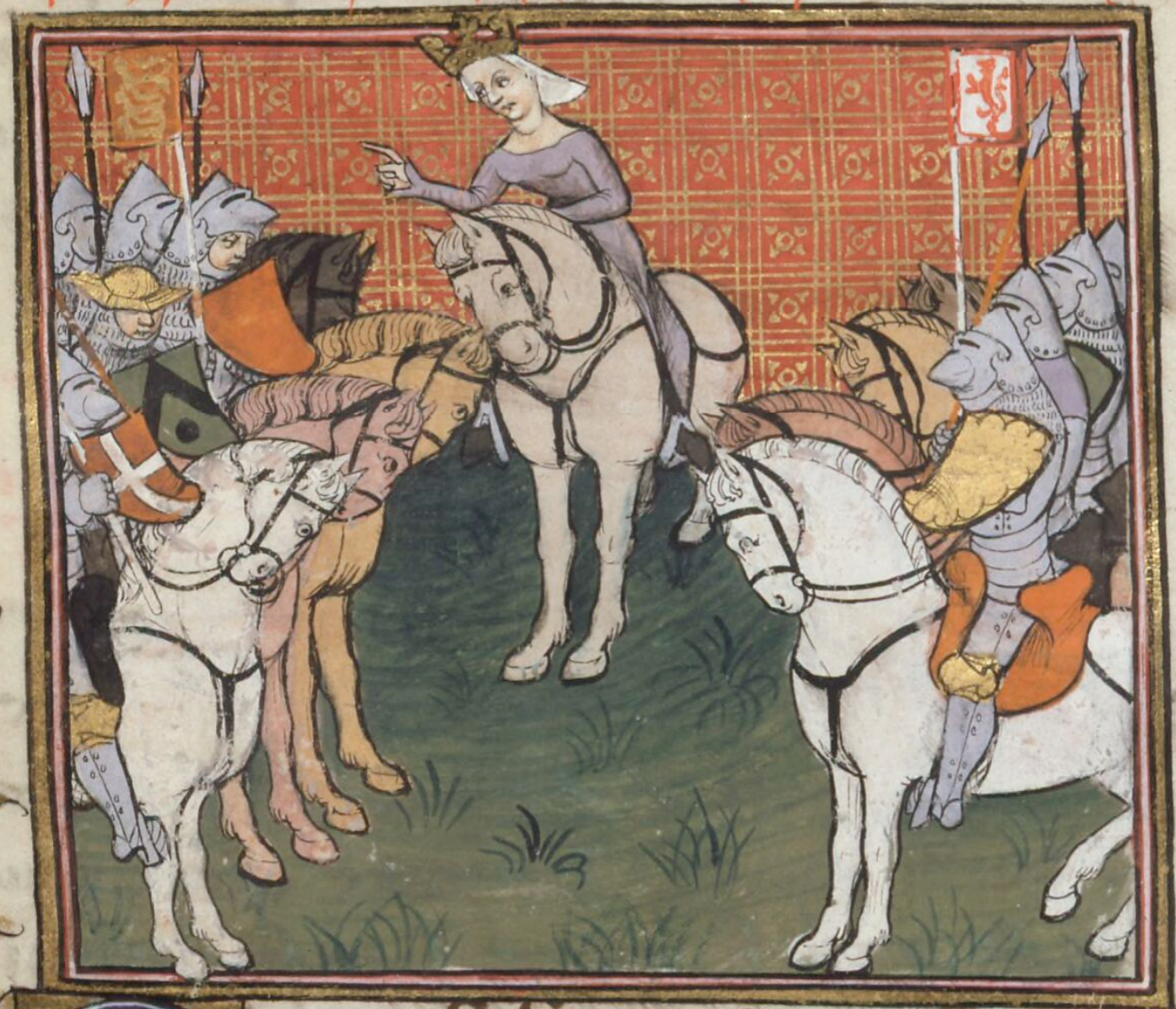
Depiction of Philippa at the Battle of Neville's Cross from Froissart's Chronicles

Philippa served as regent of England during the absence of her spouse in 1346. Facing a Scottish invasion, she gathered the English army, fought the Scots at the Battle of Neville's Cross near Durham, and rallied the English soldiers on horse before them prior to the battle. This event resulted in an English victory and the Scottish King David II being taken prisoner and held captive for eleven years.

Philippa accompanied her husband on expeditions to Scotland and the rest of Europe in the early campaigns of the Hundred Years War, where she won acclaim for her gentle nature and compassion. She was also remembered for persuading her husband to spare the lives of the Burghers of Calais, whom he had planned to execute as an example to the townspeople following his successful siege of that port.

== Death and burial ==
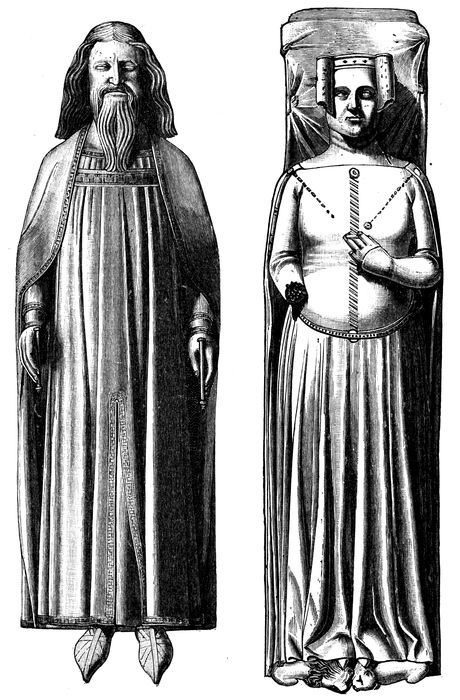
Effigies of King Edward III and Queen Philippa in Westminster Abbey

On 15 August 1369, Queen Philippa died of an illness similar to oedema in Windsor Castle. She was given a state funeral six months later on 9 January 1370 and was interred at Westminster Abbey. Her alabaster effigy was executed by sculptor Jean de Liège. Her tomb was placed on the northeast side of the Chapel of Edward the Confessor and on the opposite side of her husband's grandparents, Edward I and Eleanor of Castile. Eight years later, Edward III died and was buried next to Philippa. By all accounts, their forty-year marriage had been happy.

The Queen's College, Oxford was founded by her chaplain Robert de Eglesfield in her honour.

== Issue ==
Philippa's arms as queen consort

Philippa and Edward had thirteen children, including five sons who lived into adulthood. Three of their children died of the Black Death in 1348. The rivalry of their numerous descendants would bring about the long-running and bloody dynastic wars known as the Wars of the Roses in the 15th century.

Name	Birth	Death	Notes
Edward, the Black Prince	15 June 1330; Woodstock Palace, Oxfordshire	8 June 1376	Married his cousin Joan, Countess of Kent. Had issue (King Richard II of England).
Isabella	16 June 1332; Woodstock Palace, Oxfordshire	April 1379 or 17 June/5 October 1382	Married Enguerrand VII de Coucy, 1st Earl of Bedford. Had issue.
Joan	19 December 1333 or 28 January 1334; Tower of London	2 September 1348	Betrothed to King Pedro of Castile, but died of the plague before the marriage could take place. Pedro's two daughters would later marry Joan's younger brothers, John and Edmund.
William of Hatfield	December 1336; Hatfield Manor House, Hatfield, South Yorkshire	Died shortly after birth.	Buried at York Minster before 10 February 1337.
Lionel, 1st Duke of Clarence	29 November 1338; Antwerp	7 October 1368	Married (1) Elizabeth de Burgh, 4th Countess of Ulster. Married (2) Violante Visconti, Marchioness of Montferrat. Had issue.
John, 1st Duke of Lancaster	6 March 1340; Ghent	3 February 1399	Married (1) Blanche of Lancaster, member of the kingdom's most powerful and wealthiest family. Married (2) Infanta Constance of Castile. Married (3) his former mistress Katherine Swynford. Had issue (Henry IV of England and the Dukes of Beaufort).
Edmund of Langley, 1st Duke of York	5 June 1341; Kings Langley, Hertfordshire	1 August 1402	Married (1) Infanta Isabella of Castile and (2) Joan Holland (his 2nd cousin). Had issue.
Blanche	March 1342; Tower of London		Died shortly after birth. Buried at Westminster Abbey.
Mary	10 October 1344; Bishop's Waltham, Hampshire	September 1361	Married John IV, Duke of Brittany. No issue.
Margaret	20 July 1346; Windsor	1 October/25 December 1361	Married John Hastings, 2nd Earl of Pembroke. No issue.
Thomas	Summer 1347 Windsor	September 1348	Died in infancy of the plague. Buried at King's Langley Church, Hertfordshire. (Note: According to Kathryn Warner, the fictitious existence of "Thomas of Windsor" is a spurious story that has been shaped by two chroniclers. Philippa's son buried at Langley Priory is Edmund of Langley.)
William of Windsor	before 24 June 1348; Windsor	before 5 Sep 1348	Died in infancy. Buried at Westminster Abbey.
Thomas, 1st Duke of Gloucester	7 January 1355; Woodstock Palace, Oxfordshire	8/9 September 1397	Married Eleanor de Bohun, co-heiress of Humphrey de Bohun, 7th Earl of Hereford. Had issue.

== In popular culture ==
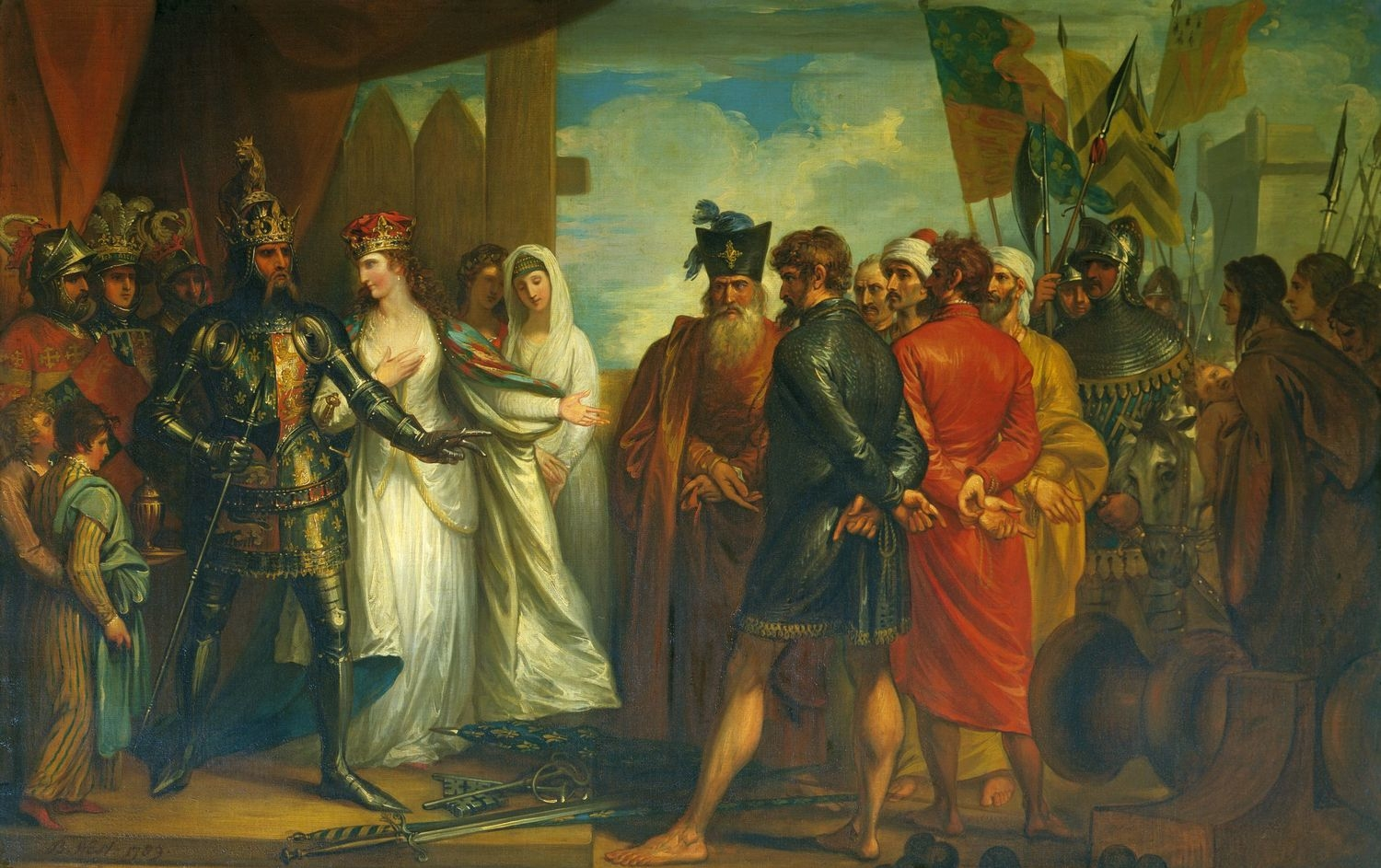
The Burghers of Calais by Benjamin West, 1789

Philippa is a character in The Accursed Kings, a series of French historical novels by Maurice Druon. She was portrayed by Françoise Burgi in the 1972 French miniseries adaptation of the series, and by Marie de Villepin in the 2005 adaptation.

In 2003, she was voted as 5th on the list of 100 Great Black Britons. The decision to include her on the list was heavily criticised, with many historians commenting that there was no evidence to suggest that Philippa had any African ancestry. (Note: "Philippa of Hainault was a European woman and emphatically not of African ancestry, and absolutely no-one in her own lifetime or long afterwards claimed otherwise, either about her or about any of her relatives and descendants." – Kathryn Warner)

== Ancestry ==
Ancestors of Philippa of Hainault

8. John I, Count of Hainaut
4. John II, Count of Holland
9. Adelaide of Holland
2. William I, Count of Hainaut
10. Henry V, Count of Luxembourg
5. Philippa of Luxembourg
11. Margaret of Bar
1. Philippa of Hainault
12. Philip III of France
6. Charles, Count of Valois
13. Isabella of Aragon
3. Joan of Valois
14. Charles II of Naples
7. Margaret, Countess of Anjou
15. Mary of Hungary

== See also ==
- Counts of Hainaut family tree
- Counts of Holland family tree

== Sources ==
- Arnold, Margot. Queen Consorts of England: The Power Behind the Throne. New York: Facts On File, 1993.
- Ashley, Mike (2002). British Kings & Queens. Carroll & Graf. ISBN 0-7867-1104-3. pages 185 & 186.
- Salmonson, Jessica Amanda. (1991) The Encyclopedia of Amazons. Paragon House. page 212. ISBN 1-55778-420-5
- Sury, Geoffroy G., Bayern Straubing Hennegau: la Maison de Bavière en Hainaut, XIVe – XVe s., (2nd Ed.), Geoffroy G. Sury, Edit., Brussels, 2010. pp. 55, 66 & 128.
- Vale, Juliet (2010) [2004]. "Philippa [Philippa of Hainault] (1310×15?–1369)". Oxford Dictionary of National Biography (online ed.). Oxford University Press. doi:10.1093/ref:odnb/22110. (Subscription, Wikipedia Library access or UK public library membership required.)
- Warner, Kathryn (2020). Philippa of Hainault: Mother of the English Nation. Amberley Publishing. ISBN 9781445662800.
- Weir, Alison (1999). Britain's Royal Family: A Complete Genealogy. London: Bodley Head. ISBN 0-7126-7448-9. page 92.

English royalty
Vacant Title last held by Isabella of France	Queen consort of England; 24 January 1328 – 15 August 1369	Vacant Title next held by Anne of Bohemia
