= Margaret, Countess of Soissons =

French noble

Margaret (or Margaretha) of Soissons (died 1344) was ruling Countess of Soissons in 1305-1344.

She was the only daughter of Hugh, Count of Soissons, and Johanna of Argies. In 1306 she succeeded her father as Countess of Soissons.

Margaret was married to John of Beaumont, son of John II, Count of Holland. Margaret and John had five children:

- Johanna of Hainault (1323–1350), married first to Louis II, Count of Blois, (three sons), and second to William I, Marquis of Namur, no issue.
- John, Canon of Cambrai.
- William, Canon of Cambrai, Beauvais and Le Mans.
- Amalrik, Canon of Cambrai, Dole and Tours.
- Reinout, Canon of Cambrai.

Upon their marriage, John became Count of Soissons, jure uxoris.
