= Philippa of Luxembourg =

Countess of Holland (1252–1311)

- Born: 1252
- Died: 6 April 1311 (aged 58–59)
- Noble family: Luxembourg
- Spouse: John II, Count of Holland
- Issue: John; Henry; Simon; William I, Count of Hainaut; John of Beaumont; Margaret; Alix; Isabelle; Jeanne; Mary of Avesnes; Matilda
- Father: Henry V of Luxembourg
- Mother: Marguerite of Bar

Philippa of Luxembourg (1252 – 6 April 1311) was the daughter of Count Henry V of Luxembourg and Marguerite of Bar. She married John II, Count of Holland.

== Issue ==
Philippa and John had:

- John (died 1302)
- Henry (died 1303), a canon in Cambrai
- Simon
- William I, Count of Hainaut, father of Queen Philippa and Margaret II
- John (Jean) (1288–1356), Seigneur de Beaumont. Married Marguerite, Countess of Soissons.
- Margaret (died 1342), wife of Robert II of Artois
- Alix (died 1317), wife of Roger Bigod, 5th Earl of Norfolk
- Isabelle (died 1305), wife of Raoul de Clermont, Seigneur de Nesle.
- Jeanne, nun at Fontenelles
- Mary of Avesnes (1280–1354), wife of Louis I, Duke of Bourbon
- Matilda, Abbess of Nivelles
- Willem de Cuser (born 1290, date of death unknown)
