= William of Exeter (physician) =

English physician to Queen Philippa

William of Exeter was physician to Queen Philippa, and held a variety of church preferments; including chancellor of Lincoln Cathedral, treasurer of Chichester Cathedral, and Provost of Holyhead. In addition to his physician role to the queen, he was also Clerk to the King, and was a trusted diplomat, responsible for negotiations with France. Like all medieval physicians, he held double doctorates: one in medicine, the other in theology. He is also said to have graduated in arts.
