= Margaret of Bar =

Countess of Luxembourg from 1220 to 1275

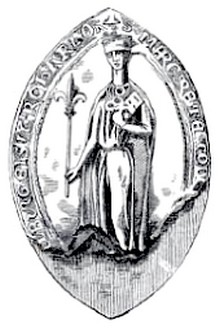
- Seal of Margaret of Bar
- Born: 1220
- Died: 1275 (aged 54–55)
- Noble family: Montbéliard
- Spouse: Henry V, Count of Luxembourg
- Issue Detail: Henry VI, Count of Luxembourg; Waleran I, Lord of Ligny; Isabelle of Luxembourg; Philippa of Luxembourg
- Father: Henry II of Bar
- Mother: Philippa of Dreux

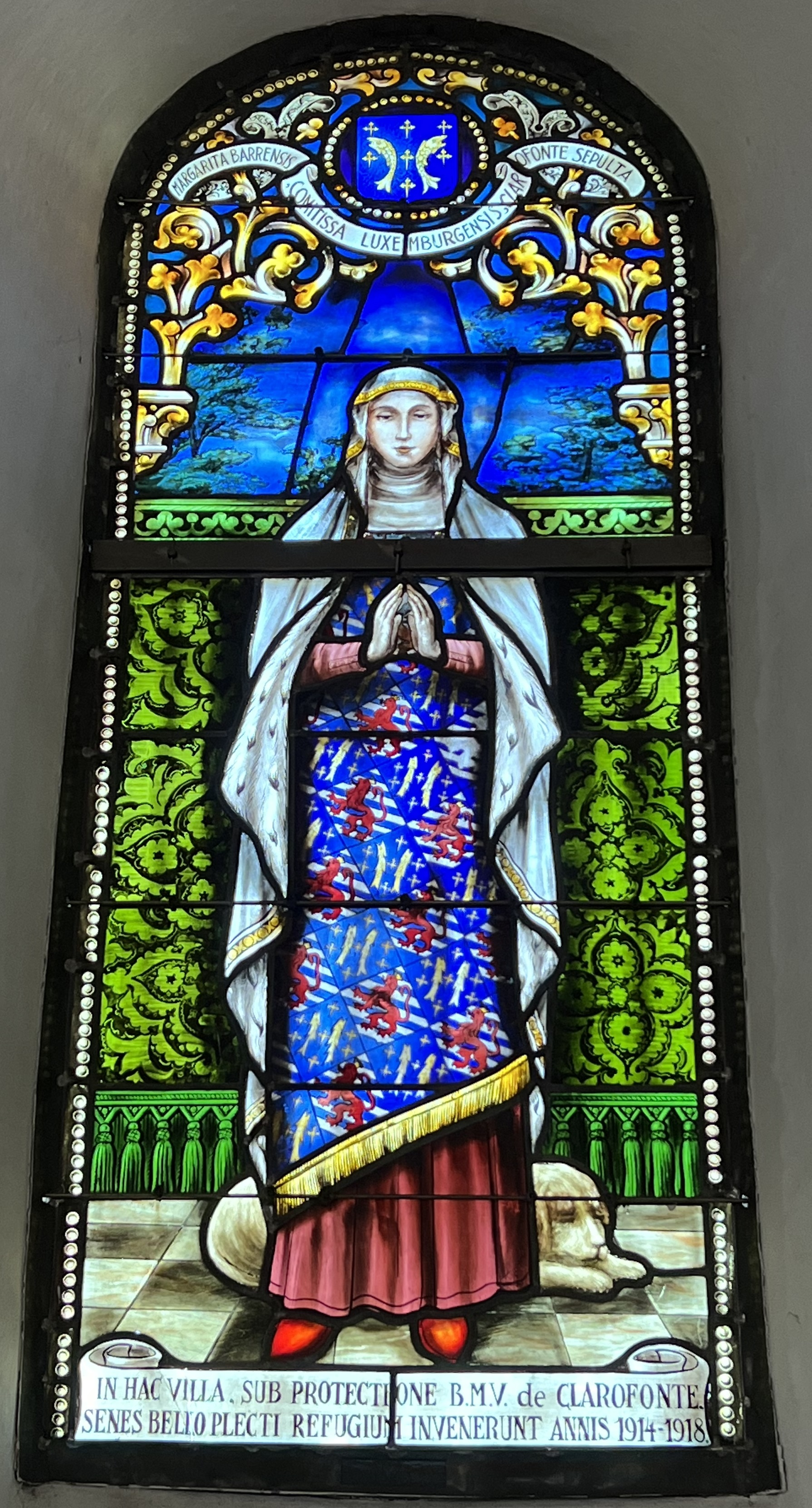
Margaret of Bar depicted in a stained glass window in the chapel of Clairefontaine Abbey in Belgium.

Margaret of Bar (1220–1275) was a daughter of Henry II of Bar and Philippa of Dreux. She was Countess of Luxembourg by her marriage to Henry V of Luxembourg. She is also known as Marguerite of Bar.

== Family ==
Margaret's maternal grandparents were Robert II of Dreux (whose paternal grandfather was King Louis VI of France) and his second wife Yolanda de Coucy. Her paternal grandparents were Theobald I of Bar and his second wife Ermesinde of Brienne.

Margaret was the eldest of seven children born to her parents. Her brother was Theobald II of Bar. Margaret's sister, Jeanne married Frédéric de Blamont. The rest of her siblings died young or unmarried.

== Marriage ==
In 1240, Margaret married Henry V of Luxembourg. Margaret was twenty years old, and Henry was twenty-four.

Margaret brought Henry Ligny-en-Barrois as her dowry, however, by a clause in the marriage contract, it remained under the feudal suzerainty of the county of Bar. In contempt of this, Henry paid homage in 1256 to Theobald II of Navarre, in his capacity as Count of Champagne. Margaret's brother, Theobald II of Bar, took advantage of the conflict then raging between Frederick III of Lorraine (their cousin) and the bishops of Metz. Henry V was a partisan of the duke and so Theobald took the side of the bishop. Henry was captured in battle at Prény on 14 September 1266. On 8 September 1268, King Louis IX arbitrated between the two counts and Henry was freed and repossessed of Ligny, but under the suzerainty of the Barrois.

Margaret and Henry had seven children:

- Henry VI (died 1288), Count of Luxembourg
- Waleran I (died 1288), Count of Ligny & Roussy
- Isabelle (1247–1298), married Guy of Dampierre
- Philippa (1252–1311), married John II, Count of Holland
- Margaret
- Felicitas
- Joanna (died 1310), Abbess of Clairefontaine

Margaret and Henry made peace with Guy of Dampierre by marrying him to their daughter, Isabelle. Their other daughter, Philippa married John II, Count of Holland and became grandparents to Philippa, Queen of England and Margaret II, Countess of Hainault.

Margaret died in 1275, six years before her husband's death.

== Ancestry ==
Ancestors of Margaret of Bar

8. Reginald II, Count of Bar
4. Theobald I, Count of Bar
9. Agnes of Champagne
2. Henry II, Count of Bar
10. Guy of Brienne
5. Ermesinde of Brienne
11. Pétronille Elisabeth de Chacenay
1. Margaret of Bar
12. Robert I, Count of Dreux
6. Robert II, Count of Dreux
13. Agnes de Baudemont
3. Philippa of Dreux
14. Raoul de Coucy
7. Yolande de Coucy
15. Agnes of Hainaut

== Sources ==
- Commire, Anne; Klezmer, Deborah, eds. (1999). "Philippa of Dreux (d.1240)". Women in World History: A Biographical Encyclopedia. Vol. 12. Yorkin Publications. ISBN 0-7876-4071-9.
- Gade, John A. (1951). Luxemburg in the Middle Ages. Brill.
- Hoensch, Jörg K. (2000). Die Luxemburger: Eine spatmittelalterliche Dynastie gesamteuropaischer Bedeutung, 1308-1437 (in German). Kolhammer GmbH. ISBN 3-17-015159-2.
- Péporté, Pit (2011). Constructing the Middle Ages: Historiography, Collective Memory and Nation-Building in Luxembourg. Brill. ISBN 978-90-04-21066-0.
