= Philippa of Dreux =

- Born: 1192
- Died: 1242 (aged 49–50)
- Noble family: Dreux
- Spouse: Henry II of Bar
- Issue: Margaret of Bar; Thiébaut II of Bar; Henry of Bar; Jeanne of Bar; Renaud of Bar; Erard of Bar; Isabelle of Bar
- Father: Robert II of Dreux
- Mother: Yolande de Coucy

Philippa of Dreux, Dame de Coucy (1192–1242) was a daughter of Robert II of Dreux and his second wife Yolande de Coucy.

== Family ==
Philippa was the fifth of seven children born to her parents, Robert II of Dreux and his second wife Yolande de Coucy.

== Spouse and children ==
In 1219, Philippa married Henry II of Bar (1190–1239), the son of Theobald I of Bar and Ermesinde (Isabella) of Bar-sur-Seine.

=== Children ===
- Margaret of Bar (1220–1275), in 1240 she married Henry V of Luxembourg
- Thiébaut II of Bar (c. 1221–1291), Succeeded Henry II as Count of Bar.
- Henry of Bar (died 1249)
- Jeanne of Bar (1225–1299), married first Frédéric de Blamont who died in 1255, and later married Louis V, Count of Chiny.
- Renaud of Bar (died 1271)
- Isabelle of Bar (died 1320)

== Sources ==
- Commire, Anne; Klezmer, Deborah, eds. (1999). "Philippa of Dreux (d.1240)". Women in World History: A Biographical Encyclopedia. Vol. 12. Yorkin Publications. ISBN 0-7876-4071-9.
- Dyggve, Holger Petersen (1942). "Personnages historiques figurant dans la poésie lyrique française des XII e et XIII e siècles XIV: Identification de Noblet, ami de Conon de Béthune, Gace Brulé et Pierre de Molins". Neuphilologische Mitteilungen (in French). 43 (1): 7–20.
- Painter, Sidney (2019). The Scourge of the Clergy: Peter of Dreux, Duke of Brittany. Johns Hopkins University Press.
- Richard, Jean (1983). Lloyd, Simon (ed.). Saint Louis, Crusader King of France. Translated by Birrell, Jean. Cambridge University Press.
