= Treaty of Paris (1323) =

Agreement resolving disputes between the counties of Zeeland and Flanders

The Treaty of Paris was signed on March 6, 1323. It established clarity over the following: Count Louis I of Flanders relinquished Flemish claims over the County of Zeeland and acknowledged the Count of Holland, William I, as the Count of Zeeland. William, in turn, agreed to renounce all claims on Flanders.

== Bibliography ==
- Arie van Steensel (2010). Edelen in Zeeland: macht, rijkdom en status in een laatmiddeleeuwse samenleving. Hilversum: Uitgeverij Verloren. p. 21. ISBN 9789087041854.

== See also ==
- List of treaties
