= Henri de Dreux =

French Roman Catholic archbishop (1193–1240)

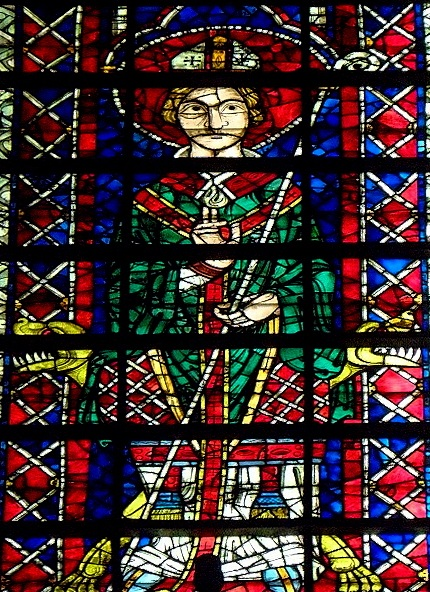
Representation of Henri de Dreux on a stained glass window of the Notre-Dame de Reims cathedral.

Henri de Dreux (1193–1240) was Archbishop of Reims from 1227 to 1240. He is commemorated by a window in Reims Cathedral.

He was an active builder, but his local taxation provoked a revolt in 1233.

He was a son of Robert II of Dreux and Yolande de Coucy.

== Notes ==
Catholic Church titles
Preceded by Guillaume de Joinville	Archbishop of Reims; 1227–1240	Succeeded by Yves of Saint-Martin
