= Clairefontaine Abbey =

Coordinates: 49°39′57″N 5°51′57″E

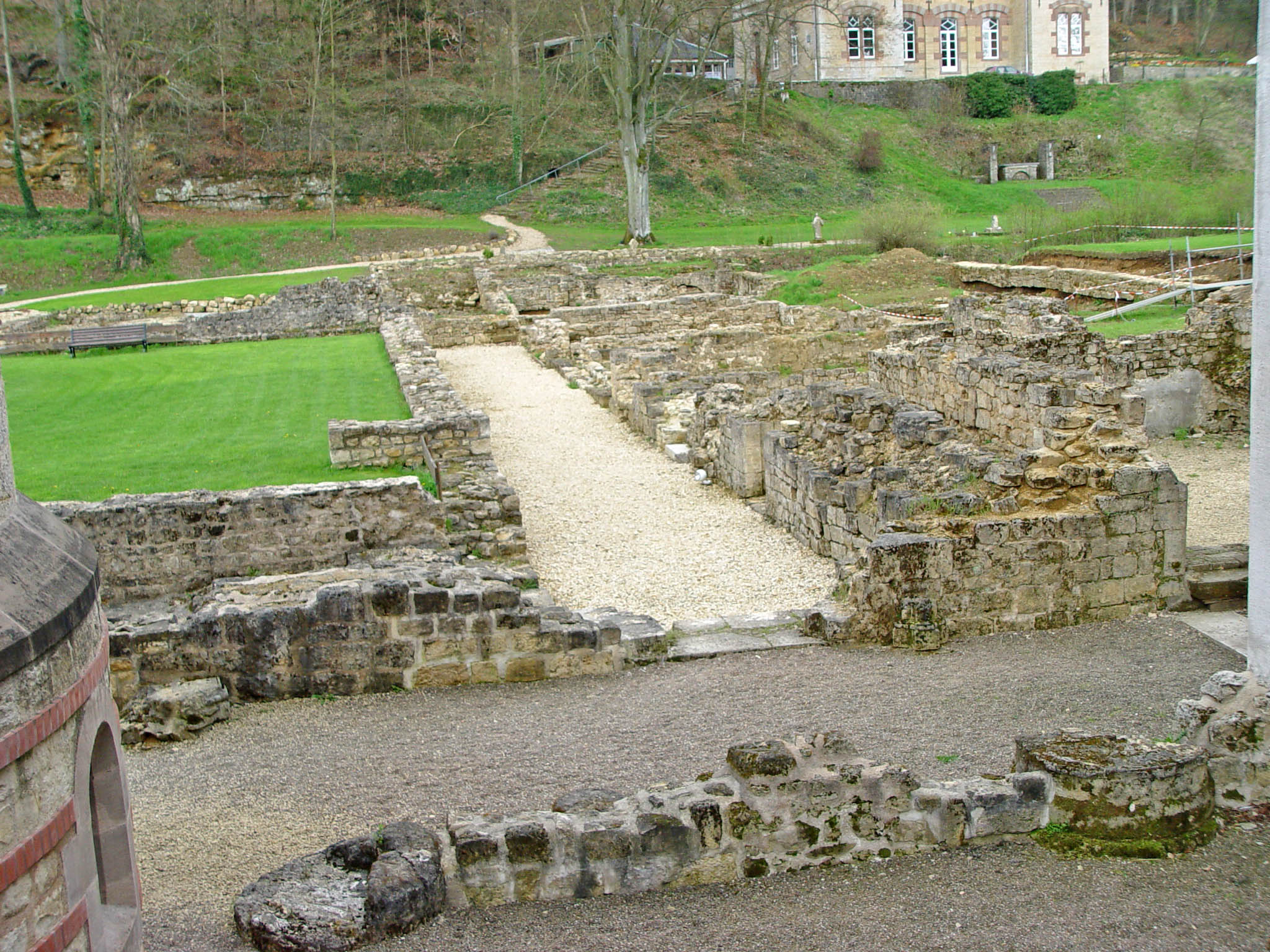
Ruins of the Abbey

Clairefontaine Abbey, also known as the Abbey of Notre-Dame de Clairefontaine, was a Cistercian nunnery founded in the middle of the 13th century and officially suppressed in 1796. Its remains are now a tourist site and place of pilgrimage, located in Wallonia near Clairefontaine, a Belgian hamlet belonging to the city of Arlon, 3 kilometres (1.9 mi) away from the Luxembourgish town of Eischen.

== History ==
According to later legend, the monastery was founded as a result of a Marian apparition in 1214 to Ermesinde, Countess of Luxembourg, on a site where Bernard of Clairvaux had blessed a spring in 1147. Later historians have argued about whether a 14th-century document purporting to be Ermesinde's will, listing gifts to the monastery, should (in whole or in part) be regarded as a copy of an earlier document, or simply as a forgery.

The earliest reliable references to the monastery date from after Ermesinde's death in 1247, and the foundation seems to have been completed, if not initiated, by her son Henry V, Count of Luxembourg. It became a key dynastic location of the House of Luxembourg, with not only Ermesinde herself buried there, but also Henry, and at least nine other members of the ruling family over the following century. In 1251 the monastery was admitted to the Cistercian Order.

The monastic community was transferred to Differdange in the 15th century, and only returned to Clairefontaine in the 16th century, under Abbess Catherine de Berentzheim. The abbey church was then extensively renovated, and it was thereafter that the legends about Ermesinde's foundation first gained currency.

During the French Revolutionary Wars the abbey was pillaged in 1793 and set on fire in 1794. It was officially suppressed by the victorious French invaders in 1796. The inhabitants of surrounding areas used the stones of the abbey to build their houses.

Around 1874 the Jesuits of Arlon acquired the site as a country retreat for their noviciate, carried out archaeological explorations of the old monastic ruins, and had a new chapel constructed. In 1968 the site became the property of a non-profit organisation based in Arlon, which still manages the remains under the name Amanoclair.

== Literature ==
- Bisdorff, Georgette (2012). Clairefontaine, un site médiéval, archéologique et historique. Die Warte: Perspectives 19|2369, 14 June 2012, pages 10–12.
- Bulletin trimestriel de l'Institut d'Archéologie du Luxembourg, no 3-4, page 163-245, "L'abbaye cistercienne de Clairefontaine - Du rêve d'Ermesinde aux réalités archéologiques", Arlon, 2010.
