= John I of Holland =

Count of Holland from 1296 to 1299

John I

Count of Holland
- Reign: 1296–1299
- Predecessor: Floris V
- Successor: John II
- Born: 1284
- Died: 10 November 1299 (aged 14–15); Haarlem
- Spouse: Elizabeth of England (m. 1297)
- House: Holland
- Father: Floris V, Count of Holland
- Mother: Beatrice of Flanders

John I (1284 – 10 November 1299) was Count of Holland and Zeeland as son of Count Floris V. John inherited the county in 1296 after the murder of his father.

Shortly after his birth, after negotiations between Floris and King Edward I of England in April 1285, he was betrothed to Elizabeth, a daughter of Edward and Eleanor of Castile. Soon after this the infant John was sent to England to be raised and educated there at Edward's court. In 1296, after the murder of John's father Count Floris V, King Edward invited a number of nobles from Holland with English sympathies, amongst whom were John III, Lord of Renesse, and Wolfert I van Borselen.

On 7 January 1297, John married Edward's daughter Elizabeth at St Peter's Church, Ipswich. Soon after this, he was allowed to return to Holland, although being made to promise to heed the council of Renesse and Borselen. Elizabeth was expected to go to Holland with her husband, but did not wish to go, leaving her husband to go alone. After some delay and spending Christmas 1297 with part of her family in Ghent, Elizabeth did join her husband in Holland in 1298.

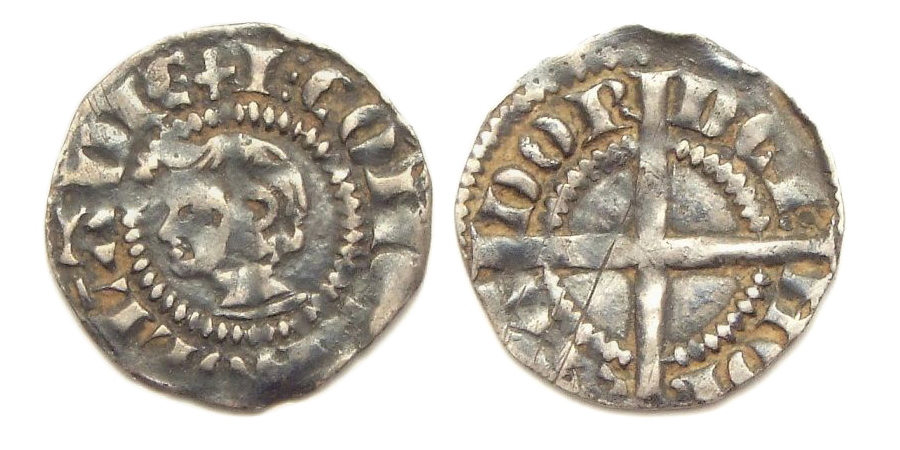
Penny or 'kopje' with portrait of John I

At first Renesse acted as regent, but on 30 April 1297, John had appointed Wolfert van Borselen regent in his stead, until his fifteenth birthday. As regent, Wolfert van Borselen, pursued a policy of neutrality towards Flanders and England. He came into conflict with the city of Dordrecht and was killed there by a mob on 30 August 1299. After this Count John II of the House of Avesnes took over the regency. Count John I of Holland died at Haarlem in the same year, on 10 November, childless and only fifteen years old, reportedly of dysentery, but there were suspicions he was murdered.

With his death without descendants, and all his siblings having died young, the heirs to the county of Holland were his father's cousins of Hainaut, sons of John's grandaunt Adelaide of Holland. From this time to the extinction of Hainaut as an independent county, Holland was in personal union with Hainaut.

Three years after John's death, his young widow remarried to Humphrey de Bohun, 4th Earl of Hereford.

== See also ==
- Counts of Hainaut family tree
- Counts of Holland family tree

== External links and sources ==
- Green, Mary Anne Everett (1857). Lives of the Princesses of England Vol. III. London. pp. 1–59.

John I of Holland House of Holland Born: 1284 Died: 10 November 1299
Preceded by Floris V	Count of Holland and Zeeland; 1296–1299	Succeeded by John II
