= Jack Walders =

English footballer

Personal information
- Full name: Jonathan Walders
- Date of birth: 1881
- Place of birth: Barrow-in-Furness, England
- Date of death: 13 January 1924 (aged 42)
- Place of death: Burnley, England
- Position: Outside right

Senior career*
Years	Team	Apps	(Gls)
- Barrow
1904–1906	Burnley	48	(2)
1906–1907	Oldham Athletic		
1907–1908	Luton Town	20	(2)
- Chorley
- * Club domestic league appearances and goals

Jonathan Walders (1881 – 13 January 1924) was an English professional footballer who played in the Football League for Burnley as an outside right. He was described as a "highly experienced, a clever dribbler and a neat crosser of the ball".

== Career ==
Walders began his career in non-League football with Barrow before being signed by Second Division club Burnley in 1903. He made 48 league appearances for Burnley and scored two goals, before leaving to join Oldham Athletic in 1906. He left Boundary Park after one season and had further spells in non-League football with Luton Town and Chorley.

== Personal life ==
Walders' brother David also became a footballer. Walders enlisted in the Loyal North Lancashire Regiment in 1899 and was stationed in Malta, Crete and Gibraltar, before returning to Britain for home service in February 1903. After Britain's entry into the First World War, he rejoined the regiment and was posted to the Western Front in August 1914. Walders was taken prisoner of war by Germany on 22 December 1914 and remained in captivity until 6 September 1918, two months before the armistice. He was discharged from the army in February 1919.

== Career statistics ==
Appearances and goals by club, season and competition
Club	Season	League			National cup (Note: Includes FA Cup)		Total	
Club	Season	Division	Apps	Goals	Apps	Goals	Apps	Goals
Luton Town	1907–08	Southern League First Division	20	2	1	0	21	2
Career total			20	2	1	0	21	2
