= William of Exeter (died 1365) =

English writer

William of Exeter (died 1365) was an English writer.

The author of a course of sermons on the Beatitudes, who must have flourished much earlier than the above-named William, since the Laudian manuscript of his work (Laud. MS., Miscell. 368, f. 106, Bodl. Libr.) cannot be later than the beginning of the thirteenth century; yet this writer's death is placed by Wood in 1365.
