= David Walders =

English footballer

Personal information
- Full name: David Walders
- Date of birth: 1879
- Place of birth: Barrow-in-Furness, England
- Date of death: 1929 (aged 49–50)
- Position: Centre half

Senior career*
Years	Team	Apps	(Gls)
- Barrow
1903–1906	Burnley	93	(3)
1907–1912	Oldham Athletic	112	(8)
Total		205	(11)
- * Club domestic league appearances and goals

David Walders (1879–1929) was an English professional footballer who played as a centre half in the Football League for Oldham Athletic and Burnley.

== Career ==
He started his career in non-league football with Barrow before being signed by Burnley in 1903. He played for Burnley for three seasons, scoring six goals in 97 games. He joined Oldham Athletic at the start of the 1907–08 season and played 122 games for the club before leaving in 1912 to sign for Southport Central. During the First World War, he returned to Burnley as a wartime guest player.

== Personal life ==
Walders' brother Jack also became a footballer.
