= Robert I of Dreux =

French prince (1137–1184)

Robert I
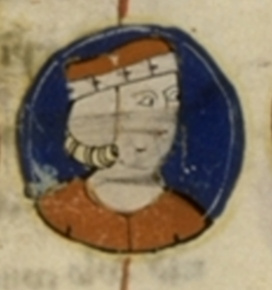

Count of Dreux
- Reign: 1137-1184
- Successor: Robert II
- Born: c. 1123
- Died: 11 October 1188 (aged 64–65) probably Braine
- Spouse: Agnes of Garlande; Hawise of Salisbury; Agnes of Baudemont
- Issue more...: Adele of Dreux; Robert II of Dreux
- House: House of Dreux
- Father: Louis VI of France
- Mother: Adelaide of Maurienne

Robert I of Dreux, nicknamed the Great (c. 1123 – 11 October 1188), was the fifth son of Louis VI of France and Adélaide de Maurienne.

== Life ==
In 1137 he received the County of Dreux as an appanage from his father. He held this title until 1184 when he granted it to his son Robert II.

In 1139 he married Agnes of Garlande. In 1145, he married Hawise of Salisbury, becoming count of Perche, as regent to his stepson Rotrou IV. By his third marriage to Agnes of Baudemont in 1152, he received the County of Braine-sur-Vesle, and the lordships of Fère-en-Tardenois, Pontarcy, Nesle, Longueville, Quincy-en-Tardenois, Savigny, and Baudemont.

Robert I participated in the Second Crusade and was at the Siege of Damascus in 1148. He was credited for bringing the Damask rose from Syria to Europe. In 1158, he fought against the English and participated in the Siege of Séez in 1154.

== Marriages and children ==
1. Agnes of Garlande (1122–1143), daughter of Anseau of Garlande, count of Rochefort.

- Simon (1141 – bef. 1182), lord of La Noue

2. Hawise of Salisbury (1118–1152), widow of Rotrou III and daughter of Walter Fitz Edward of Salisbury, Sheriff of Wiltshire

- Adele (1145 – aft. 1210), married firstly Valéran III, count of Breteuil, secondly Guy II, lord of Châtillon-sur-Marne, thirdly John I of Thorotte, fourthly Ralph, count of Soissons.
- Alice or Adelheid (1144–?)

3. Agnes of Baudemont, countess of Braine, widow of Milo III of Bar-sur-Seine (1130 – c. 1202).

- Robert II (1154–1218), count of Dreux and Braine.
- Henry (1155–1199), bishop of Orléans
- Alice (1156 – aft. 1217), married Ralph I, lord of Coucy
- Philip (1158–1217), bishop of Beauvais.
- Isabella (1160–1239), married Hugh III of Broyes
- Peter (1161–1186)
- William (1163 – aft. 1189), lord of Braye, Torcy, and Chilly
- John (1164 – aft. 1189)
- Mamilie (1166–1200)
- Margaret (1167–?), nun

== Sources ==
- Dyggve, Holger Petersen (1935). "Personnages historiques figurant dans la poésie lyrique française des XII e et XIII e siècles. III: Les dames du »Tournoiement» de Huon d'Oisi". Neuphilologische Mitteilungen. 36 (2).
- Dyggve, Holger Petersen (1942). "Personnages historiques figurant dans la poésie lyrique française des XII e et XIII e siècles XIV: Identification de Noblet, ami de Conon de Béthune, Gace Brulé et Pierre de Molins". Neuphilologische Mitteilungen (in French). 43 (1): 7-20.
- Fedorenko, Gregory (2013). "The Thirteenth Century Chronique De Normandie". In Bates, David (ed.). Anglo-Norman Studies XXXV: Proceedings of the Battle Conference 2012. The Boydell Press.
- Gilbert of Mons (2005). Chronicle of Hainaut. Translated by Napran, Laura. The Boydell Press.
- Guyotjeannin, Olivier, ed. (2000). Le chartrier de l'abbaye prémontrée de Saint-Yved de Braine (1134-1250). Ecole des Chartes.
- Michel, Edmond (1902). Histoire de la ville de Brie-Comte-Robert (in French). Vol. 1. Dujarric & Cie.
- Previté-Orton, C. W. (1979). The Shorter Cambridge Medieval History. Vol. 1, The Later Roman Empire to the Twelfth Century (10th ed.). Cambridge University Press.
- Pollock, M. A. (2015). Scotland, England and France After the Loss of Normandy, 1204-1296: Auld Amitie. Boydell & Brewer.
- Power, Daniel (2004). The Norman frontier in the twelfth and early thirteenth centuries. Cambridge University Press.
- Suger (2018). Selected Works of Abbot Suger of Saint Denis. The Catholic University of America Press.
- Wood, Charles T. (1966). The French Apanages and the Capetian Monarchy, 1224-1328. Harvard University Press.

Robert I of Dreux House of Dreux Cadet branch of the Capetian dynasty Born: c. 1123 Died: 11 October 1188
New creation	Count of Dreux; 1137–1184	Succeeded by Robert II
