= The Yage Letters (band) =

The Yage Letters were an English musical group active in the Barrow-in-Furness, Cumbria region, from 1991 to 1997. The group consisted of Chris Burke (guitars and vocals) and Steve Crabtree (guitars and vocals).

The Yage Letters released their only album, Northern Melodica Mews, which took more than five years to record. Northern Melodica Mews was recorded in A/O Studios. Burke and Crabtree were co-owners of the studio with songwriters Chris East and Barry Vernon. East penned the 1979 Cliff Richard hit single, "My Kinda Life", wrote songs for and with the American duo The Judds, and British songwriter, Mickey Jupp. East's song, "Mobile Alabama School Leaving Hullabaloo", was the B-side to "Thank You for a Lifetime" by Cliff Richard, which went to No. 3 in the UK Singles Chart in 2008.

After his tenure with The Yage Letters, Crabtree produced and directed the BBC Television film, Blood on the Turntable - The Sex Pistols (2004). Crabtree also produced and directed Virtual World/Real Millions, a June 2007 episode of BBC's The Money Programme, which was the first full BBC programme to be broadcast inside a virtual world, Second Life.

Crabtree was the series producer of BBC Young Musician of the Year in 2008.
