= William of Exeter (fl. 1320–1340) =

English author

William of Exeter was a fourteenth-century English author.

William was the author of certain 'Determinationes' against Ockham, 'De Mendicitate, contra fratres,’ 'Pro Ecclesiæ Paupertate,’ and 'De Generatione Christi,’ who is said to have been a doctor of divinity and canon of Exeter, and who may be presumed to have written between about 1320 and 1340.
