= Henry II of Bar =

Henri II, Count of Bar
- Born: 1190
- Died: 13 November 1239; Palestine
- Noble family: Montbéliard
- Spouse: Philippa de Dreux
- Issue: Margaret of Bar; Thiébaut II of Bar; Henry; Jeanne; Renaud
- Father: Theobald I of Bar
- Mother: Ermesinde of Bar-sur-Seine

Henry II of Bar in French Henri II de Bar, in German Heinrich II von Bar (1190–13 November 1239) was a Count of Bar who reigned from 1214 to 1239. He was son of Count Theobald I of Bar and his first wife, Ermesinde of Bar-sur-Seine. Henry was killed on 13 November 1239 during the Barons' Crusade, when he diverted several hundred crusaders from the main army under Theobald I of Navarre to fight an Ayyubid force at Gaza.

== Spouse and children ==
In 1219, Henry married Philippa de Dreux (1192–1242), the daughter of Robert II of Dreux.

=== Children ===
- Margaret of Bar (1220–1275), in 1240 she married Henry V of Luxembourg
- Thiébaut II of Bar (c. 1221–1291), Succeeded his father as Count of Bar
- Henry, 1249
- Jeanne (1225–1299), married first Frédéric de Blamont who died in 1255, and second Louis V, Count of Chiny
- Renaud (died 1271)

== See also ==
- Umm al-Naser Mosque

== Sources ==
- Burgtorf, Jochen (2011). "Battle of Gaza (1239)". In Mikaberidze, Alexander (ed.). Conflict and Conquest in the Islamic World: A Historical Encyclopedia. Vol. I. ABC-CLIO.
- Collin, Hubert (1988). Lotharingia: archives lorraines d'archéologie, d'art et d'histoire (in French). Vol. 1–2. Société Thierry Alix.
- Gade, John A. (1951). Luxemburg in the Middle Ages. E.J. Brill.
- Lower, Michael (2005). The Barons' Crusade: A Call to Arms and Its Consequences. University of Pennsylvania Press.
- Chazan, Mireille; Regalado, Nancy Freeman (2012). Lettres, musique et société en Lorraine médiévale: autour du Tournoi de Chauvency : Ms. Oxford Bodleian Douce 308 (in French). Librairie Droz.
- Painter, Sidney (2019). The Scourge of the Clergy: Peter of Dreux, Duke of Brittany. Johns Hopkins University Press.
- Péporté, P. (2011). Historiography, Collective Memory and Nation-Building in Luxembourg. Brill.
- Richard, Jean (1983). Lloyd, Simon (ed.). Saint Louis, Crusader King of France. Translated by Birrell, Jean. Cambridge University Press.
