= Kathryn Warner =

English historian and author

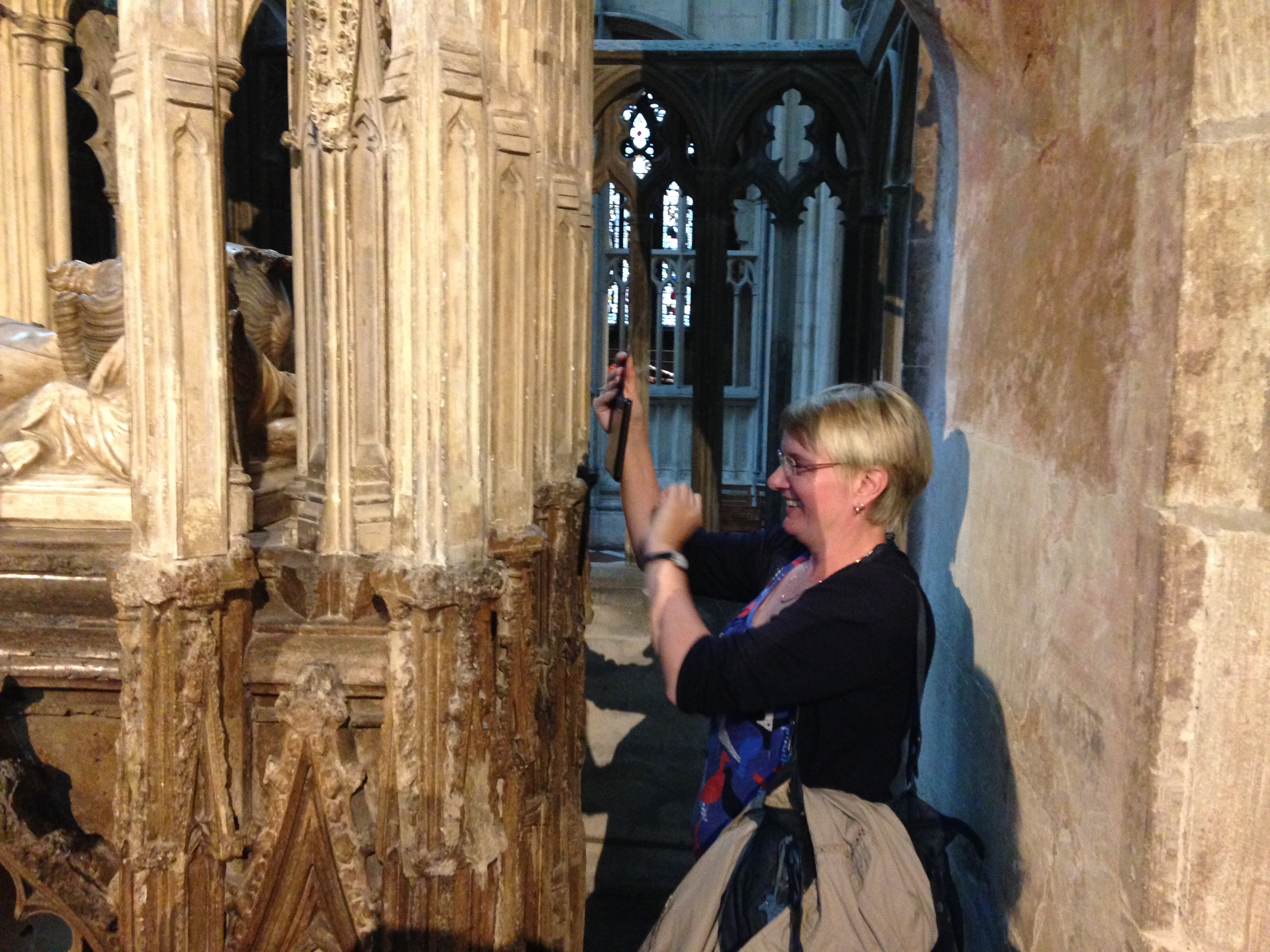
- Born: 30 June; Barrow-in-Furness
- Occupations: Historian, author
- Partner: John Alan Lamb (died 2017)
- Parent(s): Philip Warner; Elaine

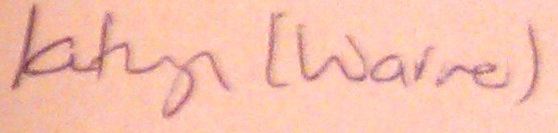
Signature of Warner

Kathryn Warner (born 30 June 19?? in Barrow-in-Furness, England) is an English historian and author, who mostly writes about the 14th century. Her best known work is a biography of King Edward II of England.

== Biography ==
Warner was born in Barrow-in-Furness, England, United Kingdom. She studied history and literature on the Manchester University and specialised in the 14th century.

She has written several books describing the Kingdom of England during the 14th century and is best known for her biographies of Edward II and his wife, Isabella of France.

== Books ==
- Edward II: The Unconventional King: a biography of Edward II, King of England
- Isabella of France: The Rebel Queen: a biography of Isabella, daughter of Philip IV and wife of Edward II
- Long Live the King: The Mysterious Fate of Edward II
- Richard II: A True King's Fall: a biography of King Richard II of England

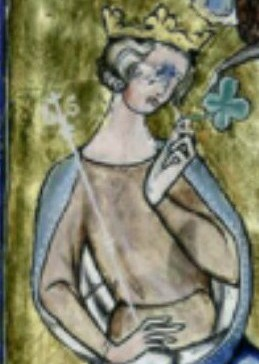
King Edward II

- Blood Roses: The Houses of Lancaster and York Before the Wars of the Roses: a history of the noble families called House of York and House of Lancaster
- Edward II and Hugh Despenser the Younger: Downfall of a King's Favourite: a biography of Hugh Despenser the Younger, a favourite of Edward II
- Sex and Sexuality in Medieval England: a history of sex and sexuality in medieval England from 1250 to 1450
- The Black Death in England: Journal of the Plague Years in the Fourteenth Century
- Life in the Medieval Town
- Edward II's Nieces: The Clare Sisters. Powerful Pawns of the Crown
- Granddaughters of Edward III
- London, a Fourteenth-Century City and Its People
- Following in the Footsteps of Edward II: a Historical Guide to the Medieval King
