= Robert II of Dreux =

French count (1154-1218)

Robert II
- Lord of Fère-en-Tardenois, Pontarcy, Nesle, Longueville, Quincy-en-Tardenois, Savigny, and Baudemont
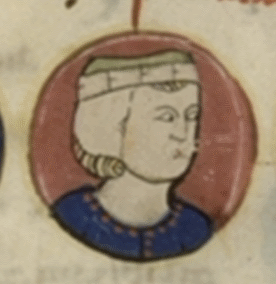

Count of Dreux
- Reign: 1184 – 28 December 1218
- Predecessor: Robert I
- Successor: Robert III

Count of Braine
- Reign: 24 July 1204 – 28 December 1218
- Predecessor: Agnes de Baudemont
- Successor: Robert III
- Born: 1154
- Died: 28 December 1218 (aged 63–64)
- Burial: Braine, église abbatiale de Saint-Ived
- Spouse: Mahaut of Burgundy; Yolande de Coucy
- Issue: Robert III; Peter I, Duke of Brittany; Henry of Dreux; John of Dreux; Philippa of Dreux; Alix of Dreux; Agnes of Dreux
- House: Dreux
- Father: Robert I
- Mother: Agnes de Baudemont, Countess of Braine

Arms of the Counts of Dreux

Robert II of Dreux (1154 – 28 December 1218), Count of Dreux and Braine, was the eldest surviving son of Robert I, Count of Dreux, and Agnes de Baudemont, countess of Braine, and a grandson of King Louis VI of France.

He participated in the Third Crusade, at the Siege of Acre and the Battle of Arsuf. He took part in the war in Normandy against the Angevin kings between 1193 and 1204. Count Robert had seized the castle of Nonancourt from Richard I of England in late 1193 while Richard was imprisoned in Germany. The count also participated in the Albigensian Crusade in 1210. In 1214 he fought alongside King Philip Augustus at the Battle of Bouvines.

== Marriages and children ==
His first marriage with Mahaut of Burgundy (1150–1192) in 1178 ended with separation in 1181 and produced no children. The excuse for the annulment was consanguinity: Mahaut and Robert were both great-great-grandchildren of William I, Count of Burgundy and his wife Étiennette, and they were both Capetian descendants of Robert II of France.

His second marriage to Yolande de Coucy (1164–1222), the daughter of Ralph I, Lord of Coucy and Agnès de Hainaut, produced several children:

- Robert III (c. 1185 – 1234), Count of Dreux and Braine
- Peter Ι (c. 1190 - 1250), Duke of Brittany
- Henry of Dreux (c. 1193 – 1240), Archbishop of Reims
- John of Dreux (c. 1198 – 1239), Count of Vienne and Mâcon
- Philippa of Dreux (1192–1242), married Henry II of Bar
- Alix of Dreux, married Walter IV of Vienne, Lord of Salins, then married Renard II of Choiseul
- Agnes of Dreux (1195–1258), married Stephen III of Auxonne
- Yolande of Dreux (1196–1239), married Raoul II of Lusignan
- Eleanor of Dreux, married Hugues IV de Châteauneuf then married Robert de Saint-Clair

== Tomb ==
Count Robert's tomb bore the following inscription, in Medieval Latin hexameters with internal rhyme:

Stirpe satus rēgum, pius et custōdia lēgum,
Brannę Rōbertus comes hīc requiescit opertus,
Et jacet Agnētis situs ad vestīgia mātris.

Of which the translation is: "Born from the race of kings, and a devoted guardian of the laws, Robert, Count of Braine, here rests covered, and lies buried by the remains of his mother Agnes."

It is also dated Anno Gracię M. CC. XVIII. die innocentum, that is, "In the Year of Grace 1218, on the Feast of the Holy Innocents."

== Ancestry ==
Ancestors of Robert II of Dreux

16. Henry I of France
8. Philip I of France
17. Anne of Kiev
4. Louis VI of France
18. Floris I, Count of Holland
9. Bertha of Holland
19. Gertrude of Saxony
2. Robert I, Count of Dreux
20. Amadeus II, Count of Savoy
10. Humbert II, Count of Savoy
21. Joan of Geneva
5. Adelaide of Maurienne
22. William I, Count of Burgundy
11. Gisela of Burgundy
23. Etiennette
1. Robert II of Dreux
24. Hugh de Baudement
12. Andre de Baudément
6. Guy de Baudement
Hugh de Braine
13. Agnes de Braine
Ade de Soissons
3. Agnes de Baudemont, Countess of Braine
7. Alix, Dame de Braine

== Notes ==
Preceded by Robert I	Count of Dreux; 1184–1218	Succeeded by Robert III
