= John II of Holland =

Count of Hainaut, Holland and Zeeland (1247–1304)

John II
- Count of Hainaut, Holland and Zeeland
- Born: 1247
- Died: 22 August 1304 (aged 56–57)
- Noble family: Avesnes
- Spouse: Philippa of Luxembourg
- Issue Detail: Mary of Avesnes; William I, Count of Hainaut; John of Beaumont; Alice of Hainault
- Father: John I of Avesnes
- Mother: Adelaide of Holland

John II (1247 – 22 August 1304) was Count of Hainaut, Holland, and Zeeland.

== Life ==
John II, born 1247, was the eldest son of John I of Hainaut and Adelaide of Holland. He became Count of Hainaut on the death of his grandmother, Countess Margaret I of Hainaut. John continued the war between the House of Dampierre and the Avesnes family against Count Guy of Flanders for Imperial Flanders.

John II became Count of Holland in 1299 upon the death of his cousin John I. The personal union he established between Hainaut and Holland–Zeeland lasted for another half-century. John I's father, Floris V, had been fighting against Flanders for Zeeland. He sought help of France against Flanders. The French defeated the Flemish in 1300 and 1301. The rebels in Zeeland were defeated as well. John's brother, Guy of Avesnes, became bishop of Utrecht. Thus, all his main enemies were gone.

The tide changed dramatically after a Flemish uprising and the defeat of the French army at the Battle of the Golden Spurs in 1302, where John's eldest son was killed fighting for the French. The Flemish attacked Hainaut and Zeeland supported by the dissatisfied population there. Guy of Namur defeated John's son, William, in a battle on the island of Duiveland. Bishop Guy of Utrecht was taken prisoner. Guy of Namur and Duke John II of Brabant conquered most of Utrecht, Holland, and Zeeland. Guy of Namur was finally defeated in 1304 by the fleet of Holland and France at the naval Battle of Zierikzee. John II regained most of his authority when he died in the same year.

== Family ==
In 1270, John married Philippa, daughter of Count Henry V of Luxembourg and Margaret of Bar. Their children were:

1. John, Lord of Beaumont, Count of Ostervant. Killed in battle (11 July 1302).
2. Henry, a canon in Cambrai, (died 1303).
3. Mary of Avesnes (1280–1354), married Louis I, Duke of Bourbon.
4. William I, Count of Hainaut (c. 1286 – 7 June 1337) He succeeded his father in 1304. Married Joan of Valois, daughter of Charles, Count of Valois.
5. John of Beaumont (1288 – 11 March 1356). He was married to Margaret, Countess de Soissons.
6. Margaret (died 18 October 1342), married Robert II of Artois, who was killed at the Battle of the Golden Spurs, 11 July 1302.
7. Alice or Alix (d. 26 October 1317), who married 1290 Roger Bigod, 5th Earl of Norfolk, by whom she had no issue.
8. Isabelle (died 1305), married Raoul de Clermont Lord of Nesle, who was killed in battle at the Battle of the Golden Spurs, 11 July 1302.
9. Joan, a nun at Fontenelles.
10. Matilda, Abbess of Nivelles.

John's illegitimate children were:

1. Willem de Cuser
2. Aleid van Zandenburg, who was married firstly to Wolfert II of Borselen, lord of Veere, and secondly to Otto III of Buren.

== See also ==
- Counts of Hainaut family tree
- Counts of Holland family tree

John II of Holland House of Avesnes Born: 1247 Died: 22 August 1304
| Preceded by Margaret I | Count of Hainaut; 1280–1304 | Succeeded by William I |
| Preceded by John I | Count of Holland and Zeeland; 1299–1304 | Succeeded by William I |
