= Henry V of Luxembourg =

Count of Luxembourg (1216–1281)

Henry V
- Count of Luxembourg
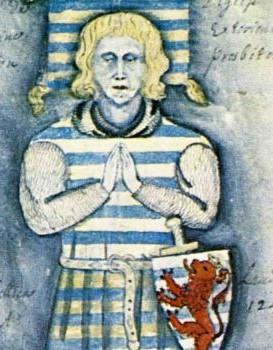
- Henry V, Count of Luxembourg
- Born: 1216
- Died: 24 December 1281
- Noble family: House of Luxembourg (founder)
- Spouse: Margaret of Bar
- Issue Detail: Henry VI, Count of Luxembourg; Waleran I, Lord of Ligny; Isabelle of Luxembourg; Philippa of Luxembourg
- Father: Waleran III, Duke of Limburg
- Mother: Ermesinde, Countess of Luxembourg

Henry V the Blondell (1216 – 24 December 1281), called the Great, was the Count of Arlon from 1226 to his death, Lord of Ligny from 1240 to his death, Count of Luxembourg and Laroche from 1247 to his death, and the Marquis of Namur between 1256 and 1264 as Henry III. He was the son and successor of Waleran III, Duke of Limburg and Ermesinde, Countess of Luxembourg.

== Reign ==
In 1226, following the death of his father Waleran III, Henry inherited the County of Arlon.

In 1240 Henry married Margaret, daughter of Henry II of Bar and Philippa of Dreux. Henry's marriage to Margaret brought him Ligny-en-Barrois as her dowry, though, by a clause in the marriage contract, it remained under the feudal suzerainty of the County of Bar. In contempt of this, Henry paid homage in 1256 to King Theobald II of Navarre in the latter's capacity as Count of Champagne. Henry's brother-in-law Count Theobald II of Bar took advantage of the conflict then raging between Duke Frederick III of Lorraine and the bishops of Metz. Henry V was a partisan of the duke and so Theobald took the side of the bishop. Henry was captured in battle at Prény on 14 September 1266. On 8 September 1268, King Louis IX of France arbitrated between the two counts and Henry was freed and repossessed of Ligny, but under the suzerainty of the Barrois.

Henry inherited Luxembourg and Laroche following the death of his mother, Ermesinde, in 1247. In 1256, Henry seized Namur while the reigning margrave, Baldwin II, was also reigning emperor in Constantinople. Baldwin sold his rights to Namur to Guy, Count of Flanders, who retook the margraviate from Henry. The two parties made peace and Guy married Henry's daughter, Isabelle.

Upon receiving 15,000 tournois from the Pope, Henry joined Edward of England on the Ninth Crusade. He returned with his remaining retainers after the crusaders achieved a truce with the Mamluk Sultanate.

== Issue ==
From Margaret he had the following issue:

- Henry VI (died 1288), Count of Luxembourg
- Waleran I (died 1288), Count of Ligny & Roussy.
- Isabelle (1247–1298), married Guy of Dampierre
- Philippa (1252–1311), married John II, Count of Holland
- Marguerite (lady of Macheren), living 1302
- Felicitas
- Jeanne (died 1310), Abbess at the Abbey of Clairefontaine

He also had at least two illegitimate sons, including:

- Henry, bastard of Luxembourg (died 1288), married Isabelle of Houffalize, heiress of Houffalize
- Baldwin

All of his sons perished in the Battle of Worringen in 1288.

== Sources ==
- Arblaster, Paul (2012). A History of the Low Countries. Palgrave Macmillan.
- Gade, John A. (1951). Luxemburg in the Middle Ages. E.J. Brill.
- Hoensch, Jorg K. (2000). Die Luxemburger: Ein spatmittelalterliche Dynastie gesamteuropaischer Bedeutung, 1308-1437 (in German). Verlag W. Kohlhammer. ISBN 3-17-015159-2.
- Jackson-Laufer, Guida Myrl (1999). Women Rulers Throughout the Ages: An Illustrated Guide. ABC-CLIO. ISBN 9781576070918.
- Verbruggen, J. F. (2002). DeVries, Kelly (ed.). The Battle of the Golden Spurs (Courtrai, 11 July 1302). Translated by Ferguson, David Richard. Boydell Press.

Henry V of Luxembourg House of Ardennes-Verdun Born: 1216 Died: 24 December 1281
Preceded by Ermesinde	Count of Laroche; 1247–1281	Succeeded by Waleran I
Preceded by Ermesinde	Count of Luxembourg; 1247–1281	Succeeded by Henry VI
Preceded by Waleran III	Count of Arlon; 1226–1281	Succeeded by Henry VI
Preceded by Baldwin II	Marquis of Namur; 1256–1264	Succeeded by Guy
