= County of Zeeland =

County of the Holy Roman Empire and the Dutch Republic (11th to 18th centuries)

Coordinates: 51.6667°N 3.8333°E

County of Zeeland Graafschap Zeeland (Dutch)
- 1012; 1014 years ago–1795; 231 years ago
- Coat of arms

- The County of Zeeland around 1350.
- Status: State of the Holy Roman Empire (until 1581/1648); Province of the Dutch Republic (1581/1648-1795/)
- Capital: Middelburg
- Common languages: Dutch
- Religion: Catholic Church; Protestantism
- Government: Feudal monarchy
- Historical era: Middle Ages, Renaissance, Modern
  - Established: 1012; 1014 years ago
  - Held by Holland: 1323; 703 years ago
  - To Burgundy: 1432; 594 years ago
  - Joined Burgundian Circle: 1512; 514 years ago
  - Part of Dutch Republic: 1581; 445 years ago
  - Disestablished: 1795; 231 years ago
Preceded by	Succeeded by
Frisia	Batavian Republic

The County of Zeeland (Dutch: Graafschap Zeeland) was a county of the Holy Roman Empire in the Low Countries and it later became one of the seven provinces of the Dutch Republic. It covered an area in the Scheldt and Meuse delta roughly corresponding to the modern Dutch province of Zeeland. The County of Zeeland did not include the region of Zeelandic Flanders which was part of Flanders; conversely, the modern Province of Zeeland does not include Sommelsdijk, historically part of the County of Zeeland.

== History ==
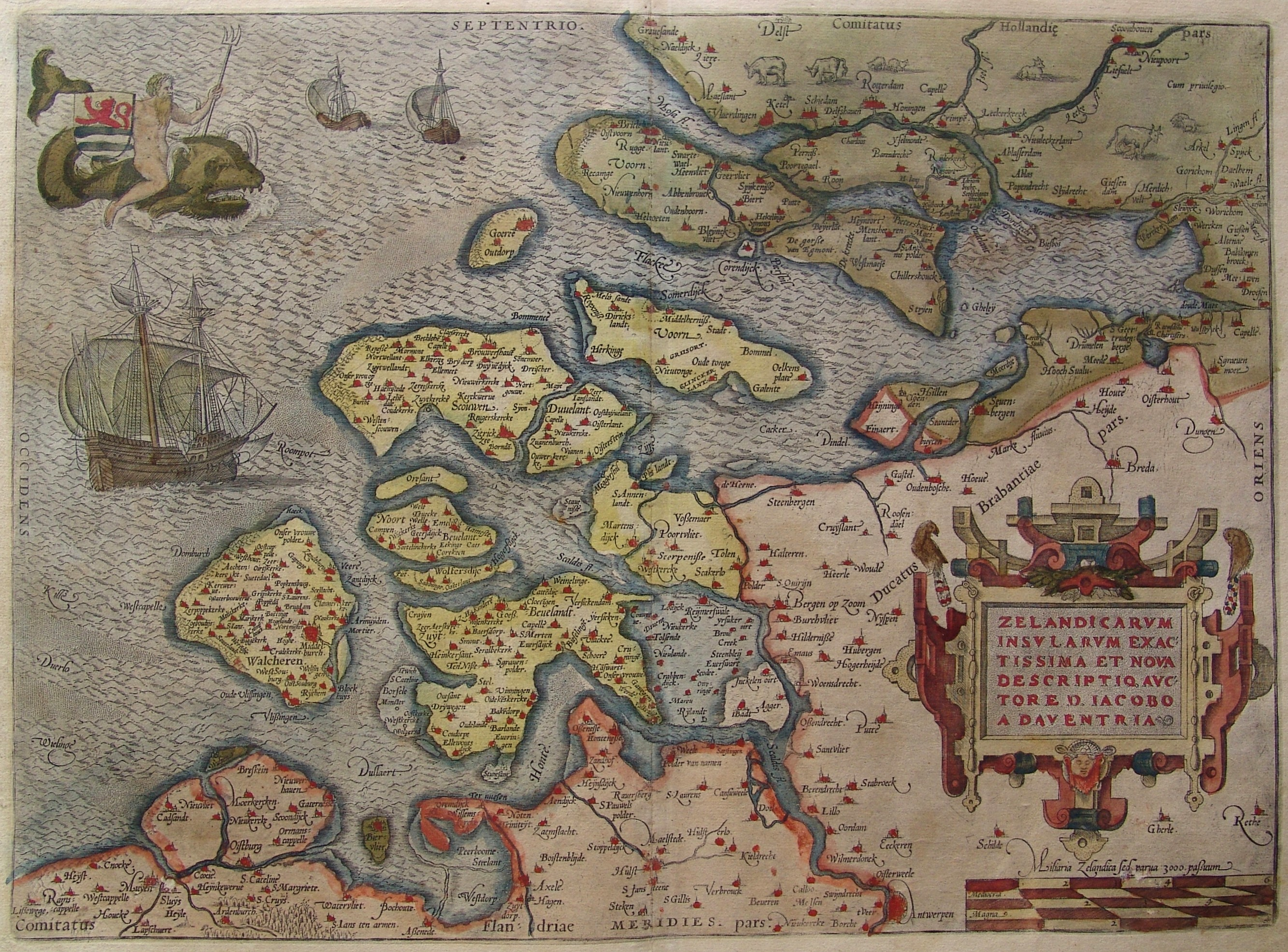
County of Zeeland, Jacob van Deventer, around 1580.

Historically the area was often under the influence of its stronger neighbors, the County of Holland, the County of Hainaut and the County of Flanders. In 1012 Emperor Henry II the Saint enfeoffed the French count Baldwin IV of Flanders with Zeeland after which both counties were ruled in personal union, contested by northern Holland from the beginning. In 1167 a war broke out between the counties, after which Count Floris III of Holland had to acknowledge the overlordship of Count Philip of Flanders in Zeeland. Count Floris IV of Holland (1222-1234) reconquered Zeeland, which from the accession of Count Floris V, the son of William II of Holland, in 1256 was ruled in personal union by Holland.

As of 1250, there was no generally recognized Zeeland county title. By the 1323 Treaty of Paris between Flanders and Hainaut-Holland, the Count of Flanders reneged from claims on Zeeland and recognized the count of Holland as Count of Zeeland. With this treaty, the County of Zeeland was now recognized as a clearly demarcated political-administrative entity. Zeeland remained a separate administrative unit, which in turn was under the administration of the counts of Holland. In 1432 it was annexed by the Burgundian duke Philip the Good and became part of the Burgundian Netherlands. After the death of Mary of Burgundy in 1482, Zeeland according to the Treaty of Senlis was one of the Seventeen Provinces held by the House of Habsburg, which in 1512 joined the Burgundian Circle.

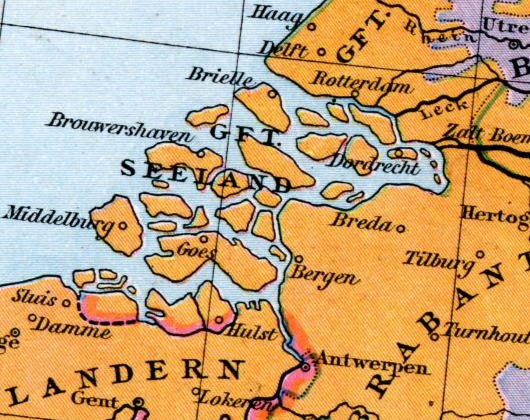
The County of Zeeland in the 15th century

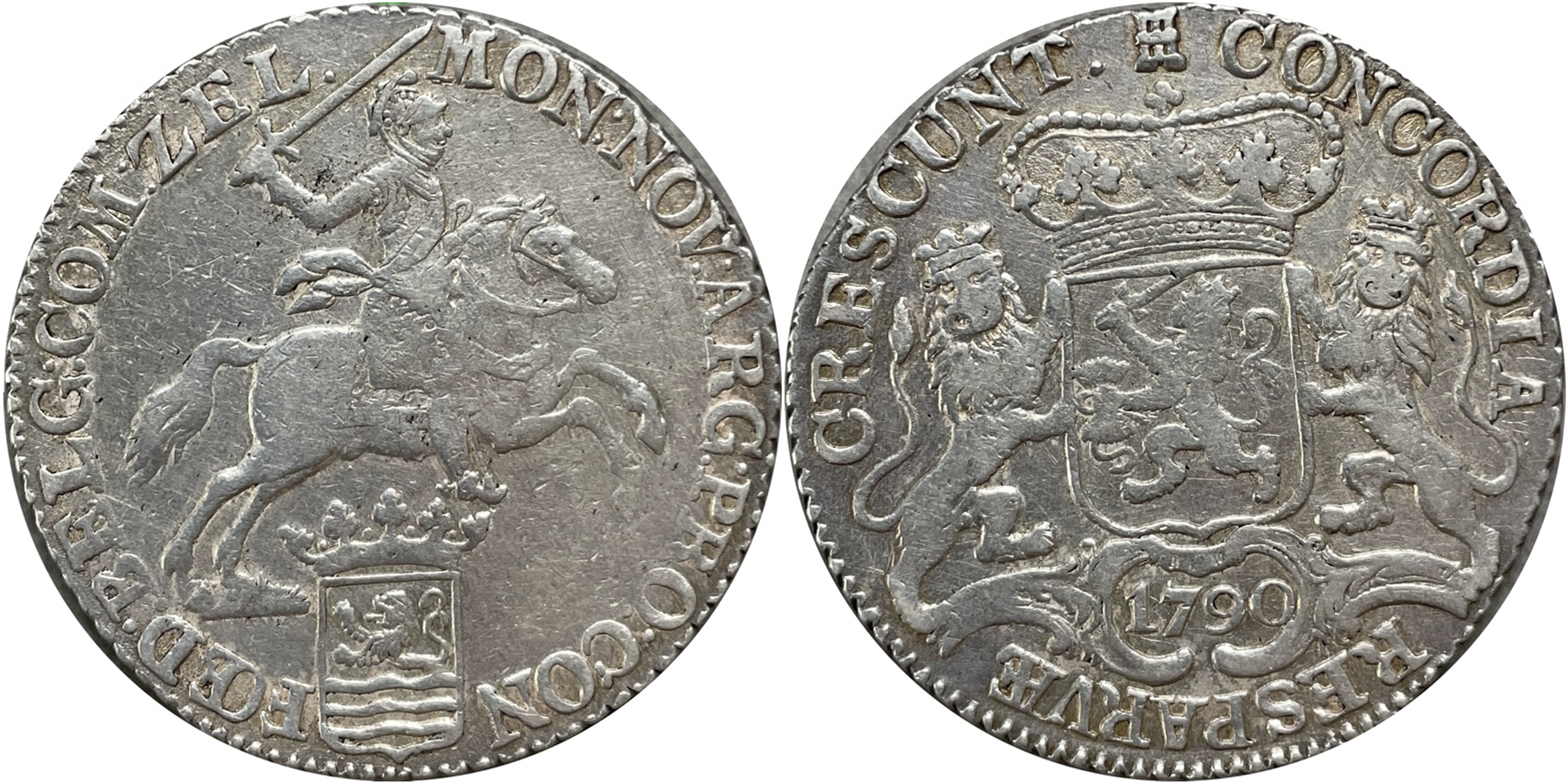
Silver coin: 1 ducaton Dutch Republic, minted in Zeeland in 1790

After the Eighty Years' War, Zeeland was one of the United Provinces of the Dutch Republic established in 1581. Both before and after Dutch independence Zeeland shared some institutions with the States of Holland and West Friesland, such as the supreme court, the Supreme Council of Holland, Zeeland and West-Friesland, after the northern provinces had removed themselves from imperial authority and the jurisdiction of the Grand Council of Mechelen.

After establishment of the States-General of the Netherlands in 1583, Middelburg initially became the place of assembly. From 1585 on they were held in The Hague. As a (theoretically) independent (part) state the county Zealand ceased to exist under the Batavian Republic in 1795, when it became a département. Together with Zeelandic Flanders it today forms the province of Zeeland.

=== Rulers of Zeeland ===
Counts of Flanders	1012–1167
Condominium of the Counts of Flanders and Holland	1167–1256
Counts of Holland and Zeeland	1256–1572
States of Zeeland	1572–1795

== Cities in the County of Zeeland ==
Voting cities, in order of importance:

- Middelburg (1217)
- Zierikzee (1248)
- Reimerswaal (1374) until 1574 voting in the States of Zeeland,
- Goes (1405)
- Tholen (1366)
- Vlissingen (1315) voting in the States of Zeeland from 1574 on
- Veere (1355) voting in the States of Zeeland from 1574 on

Small towns (no seat in the States of Zeeland):

- Arnemuiden (1574)
- Brouwershaven (1477)
- Domburg (1223)
- Kortgene (1431)
- Sint Maartensdijk (1491)
- Westkapelle (1223)

== See also ==
- Count of Holland
