= The Treatise (Walter of Bibbesworth) =

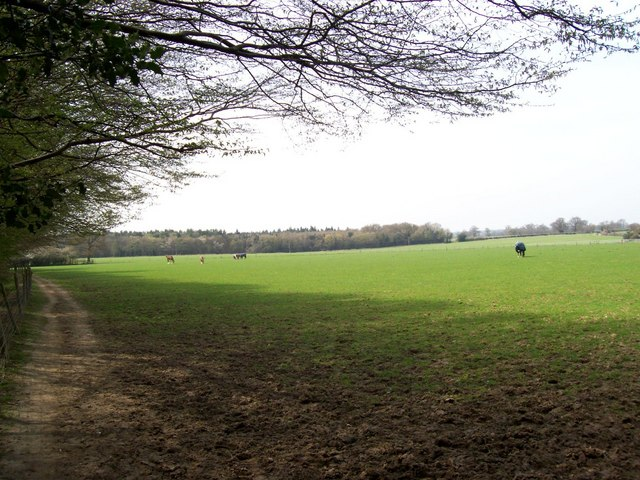
Farmland near Bibbsworth Hall, Kimpton, Hertfordshire

The Treatise (original title Le Tretiz) is an Anglo-Norman poem written in the mid-13th century by Walter of Bibbesworth, addressed to Dionisie de Munchensi, with the aim of helping her to teach her children French, the language of the Norman aristocracy. It was a popular text in medieval England, and is a very early example of a book intended for reading to children.

The dating of the poem is uncertain. Various scholarly estimates place the composition date between Dionisie's marriage in 1234 and 1285.

== Preface ==
How the author and the addressee knew one another is unknown, though their families both farmed land within reach of Hertford Fair, held annually from 1226. In some manuscripts the text opens with a preface stating that the work is written for Madame Dyonise de Mountechensi. In others the poem is preceded by a letter of dedication, addressed simply Chere suer ("Dear sister"), a phrase that expresses equality in their social relationship and some friendship between them. The letter continues: "You have asked me to put in writing for your children a phrase book to teach them French."

== Dating ==
Dionisie's name had been "de Anesty" until her marriage to Warin de Munchensi in 1234. From that date she had two young stepchildren, John and Joan de Munchensi (who were grandchildren of William Marshal) and she soon bore one child of her own, William. The book was perhaps written for Dionisie's marriage or soon after, and "John, William and Joan probably learned their French" from this book.

== Fate of Dionisie's children ==
Dionisie "lacked the requisite fluency" to make her children confident French-speakers but a knowledge of the language would be essential in the future careers of William, a turbulent politician, and especially Joan: she unexpectedly gained a "very rich inheritance" in 1247, and King Henry III chose her in the same year to marry his half-brother William of Valence.

== Topics of the poem ==
The author's original intention was probably that the de Munchensi children would be looking at the text while Dionisie read it aloud. The poem, written in rhyming lines of irregular length (usually 7 or 8 syllables), presents a series of topics beginning with birth and childhood, listing plants, animals and animal cries, continuing through household tasks and farm work, including fishing, baking, brewing, house-building, ploughing and carting, and ending with a "great feast". An emphasis on learning to manage a household and an estate has been noted. The list of collective nouns for animals and the list of animal cries are the earliest sources for this special vocabulary in any European vernacular.

== In-text English translations ==
In most manuscripts various words in the French text are accompanied by English translations, written between the lines or in the margins. These glosses help to show that the book is intended for children whose first language is English and whose second language is to be French. A particular aim, according to the text, was that they should "be better taught in speech and not made fun of by others". The Treatise marks a turning point in the linguistic history of medieval England, showing that by its date English "had already become the mother tongue of the children of the Anglo-Norman nobility, and that they learnt it before they were taught French."

== Use as a children's book ==
It is among the very earliest books in any language explicitly intended "for children to hear and read". It remained a popular text for two centuries, as shown both by the number of manuscripts in which it survives independently, and by its re-use as part of the 14th-century collection Femina Nova, compiled for older students at a period when few English children learned French in their early years.
