= Wernher von Homberg =

Knight in service of Emperor Henry VII

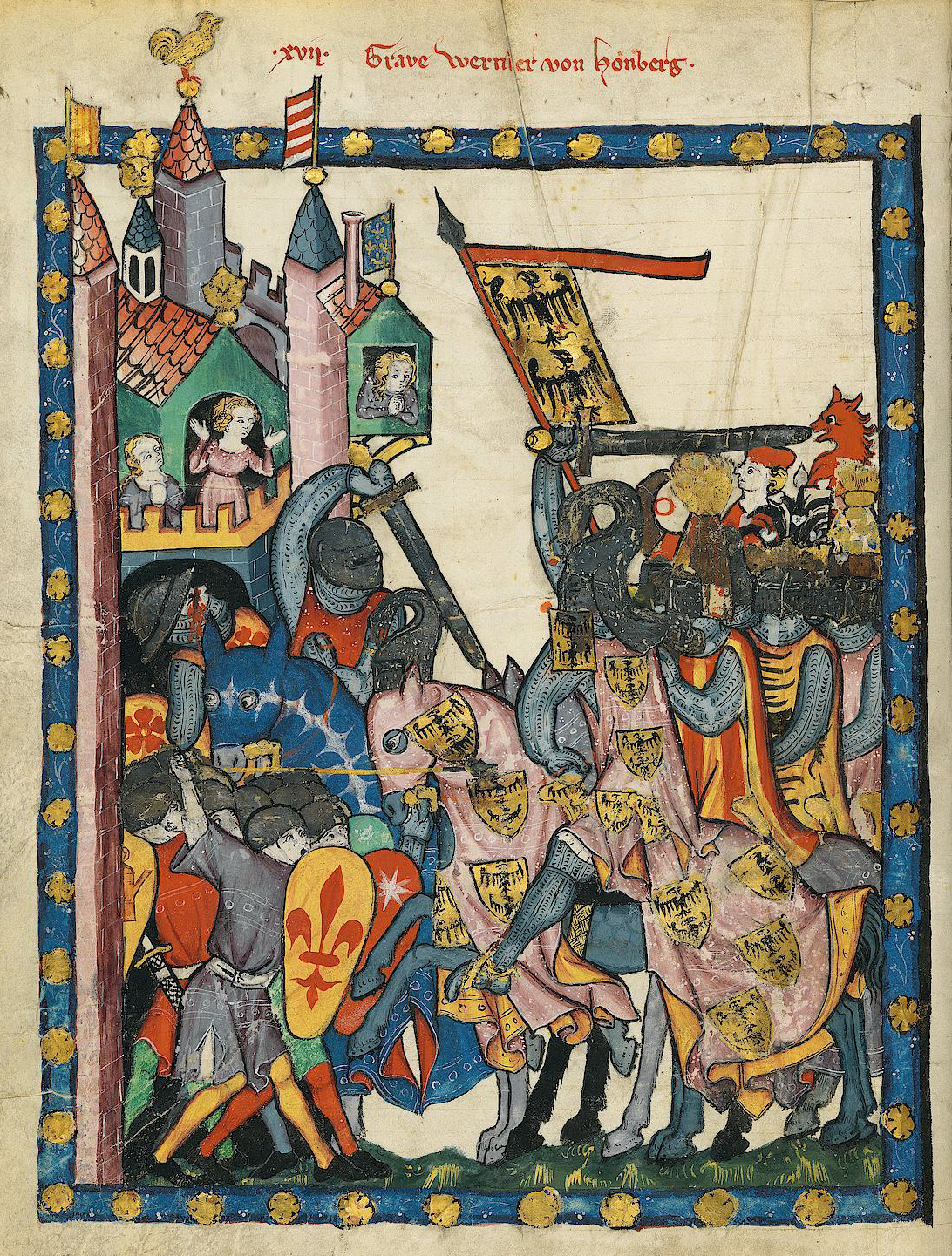
Graf Wernher von Homberg, Codex Manesse folio 43v

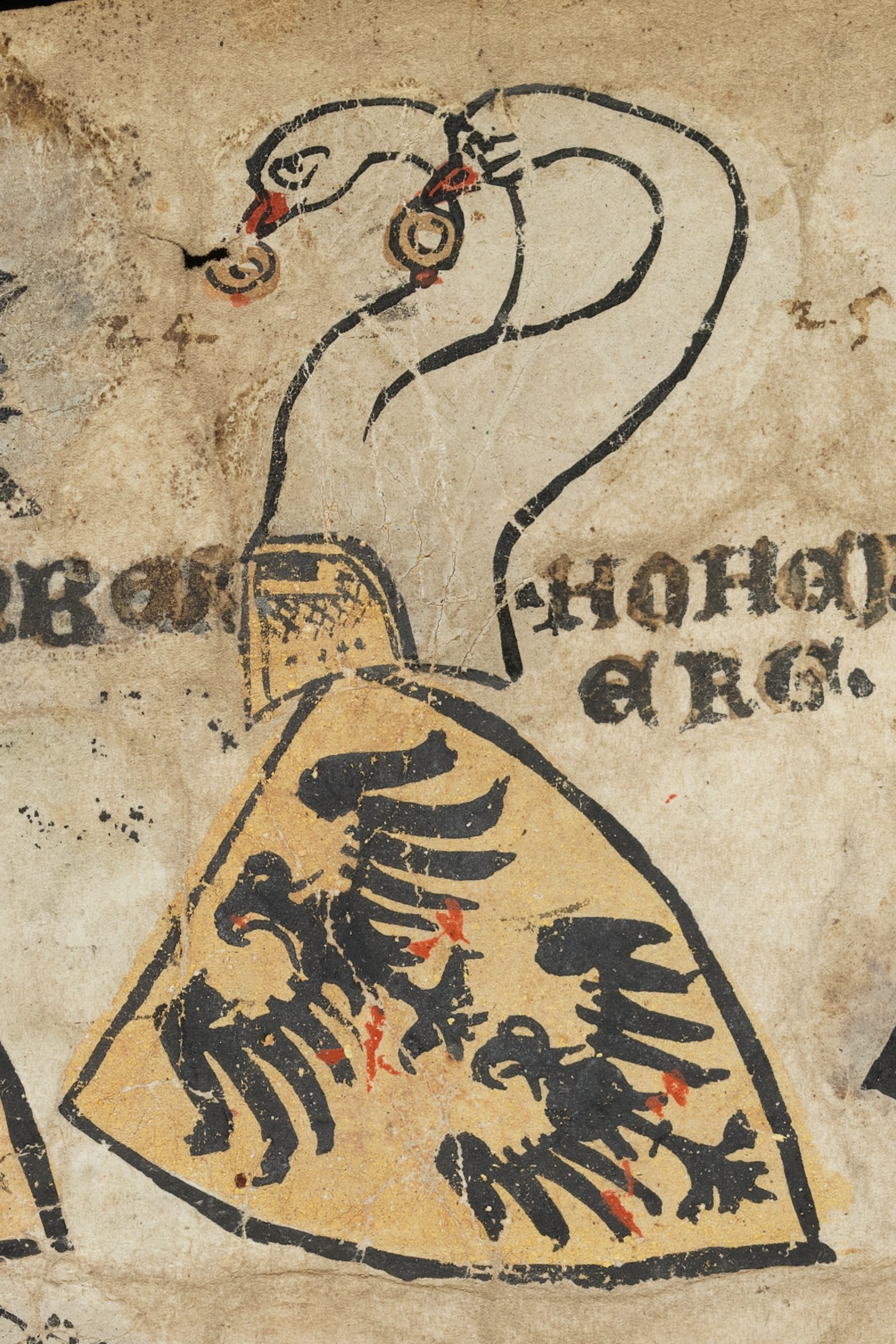
Homberg coat of arms (Zurich armorial, c. 1340).

Wernher von Homberg (also Werner; Hohenberg, 1284 – 21 March 1320) was a knight in the service Emperor Henry VII, and later of Frederick the Fair. His Minnesang poems are recorded in the Codex Manesse.

Wernher's father was Ludwig of Homberg (d. 1289 in the battle of Schosshalde, the son of Hermann IV of Frohburg), and his mother was Elisabeth von Rapperswil (d. 1309), the heiress of Rudolf, Count of Rapperswil. At the death of her husband, Elisabeth gave her estates in Rapperswil to her children. Elisabeth, like her mother and father before, was an ally of the city of Zürich, held citizenship (Burgrecht) there. She was patron of the Oetenbach nunnery, and Wernher's sister, Cecilia von Homberg became the prioress there.

Wernher inherited territories that today form the northern part of the canton of Schwyz. Beginning in 1302, king Albert I of Germany laid claim to these territories, prompting Wernher to enter a pact with the people of Schwyz. In 1303, Wernher sold Homberg castle and the city of Liestal to the bishop of Basel. In 1304/5 he joined the Livonian crusade of the Teutonic order. His eight extant Minnelieder were composed during this time.

In 1309, Wernher was given the position of reeve of Schwyz. He participated in the Italian campaign of emperor Henry during 1310 – 1313. For his service in Milan, he received the title of lieutenant general of Lombardy as well as the right to collect the imperial tax at Flüelen. He entered the service of king Frederick in 1314. In the Morgarten war of 1315, he attempted to mediate between the parties, and does not appear to have participated as combatant.

In 1315, he married the widow of his step-father, Maria von Oettingen (d. 1369). In 1319 he went to support the Ghibelline siege of Genoa, and most likely died on this campaign. The Our Lady Chapel at Oetenbach, where Wernher's sister Cecilia was prioress, was donated in Wernher's name in 1320.

== Poems ==
Eight Minnelieder are attributed to Wernher in Codex Manesse, with the following incipits:

1. Mit urlob wil ich hinnan varn / unt scheiden von dem lande / und niemen wider komen drin ("With leave, I will fare hence, and depart from the land, and never come back to it")
2. Min vro minnekliche Minne / war umbe hant ir mir die sinne / so ser, so vast an si gewant ("My lady lovable Love, why have you set my mind so much, so fast upon her?")
3. Mit urlob wil ich scheiden von dem lande / hertz' unde muot daz laz' ich ir ze pfande ("With leave I will depart the land, my heart and mind I give to her as pawn")
4. Mich jamert uz der mâze / nach der lieben vrowen min ("I yearn beyond all measure for my beloved lady")
5. Ez ist ein spot / vart ie hertze von leide verseret / sam daz mine? Minne daz ist din getat ("It is a mockery, was there ever a heart as devastated by suffering such as mine? Love, this is your doing")
6. Wol mich hiut und iemer me, ich saeh ein wip, der ir munt von roete bran ("It is well for me, today and forever more, I have seen a woman, whose mouth was burning with redness")
7. Ich muoz klagen, daz diu zit / sich so gar verkeret hat ("I must lament, that the times have turned around so completely")
8. Wie mak daz iemer so beschehen / daz ich so sere fürcht' ein wip ("How could it ever have come to pass, that I am so afraid of a woman")
