= Beatrice of Luxembourg =

Queen consort of Hungary
- Tenure: 1318–1319
- Born: 1305
- Died: 11 November 1319 (aged 13–14); Temesvár, Hungary
- Burial: Nagyvárad Cathedral
- Spouse: Charles I of Hungary
- House: Luxembourg
- Father: Henry VII, Holy Roman Emperor
- Mother: Margaret of Brabant

Beatrice of Luxembourg (Hungarian: Luxemburgi Beatrix, Luxembourgish: Béatrice vu Lëtzebuerg; 1305 – 11 November 1319), was by birth member of the House of Luxembourg and by marriage Queen of Hungary.

She was the youngest child of Henry VII, Holy Roman Emperor and his wife, Margaret of Brabant. Her two siblings were John of Luxembourg and Marie of Luxembourg, Queen of France.

== Life ==
At the time of his death (1313), Emperor Henry VII initiated the negotiations for a marriage between Beatrice and Charles, Duke of Calabria, son and heir of King Robert of Naples, and also planned to marry again (his wife was already dead in 1311) with Catherine of Habsburg. Beatrice was called by her father to Italy, where she arrived with her paternal grandmother, Beatrice d'Avesnes. The marriage plans with the Duke of Calabria failed, and the Emperor began negotiations for a marriage with Prince Peter of Sicily, eldest son and heir of King Frederick III; however, the current political conflicts between the Holy Roman Empire and the Kingdom of Sicily soon ended this planned betrothal too.

When King Charles I of Hungary (whose first wife Maria of Bytom, had died in 1317) decided to marry again, he sent to the Kingdom of Bohemia two representants, Thomas Szécsényi and Simon Kacsics, in addition to an interpreter, a bourgeois from Szoprońskim called Stephen, in order to find a bride. King John called his two sisters to his court; at that moment, Marie resided in St. Marienthal Abbey and Beatrice remained in Italy. Both princesses arrived to Prague on 20 June 1318, and three days later, the Hungarian envoys met both girls at the monastery of Zbraslav, where the Bohemian king gave them the opportunity to choose between them their future queen. After a calculated assessment of both personal and physical attitudes, they chose Beatrice. Soon after, the formal engagement took place, and the young bride parted with the Hungarian entourage to her new home. On the border of the Kingdom of Hungary she was officially welcomed by Charles I's messengers. Beatrice and Charles I married at the Octave of Saint Martin (between 12 and 17 November) and she was crowned Queen of Hungary in the ceremony.

Beatrice became pregnant in 1319. In November, she went into labour but died while giving birth. The child was stillborn. She was buried at Nagyvárad Cathedral.

Beatrice of Luxembourg House of Luxembourg Born: 1305 Died: 11 November 1319
Royal titles
Preceded by Maria of Bytom	Queen consort of Hungary; 1318–1319	Succeeded by Elisabeth of Poland
