= Earl of Wexford =

Earl of Wexford is an English or Irish peerage, and may refer to:

- William de Valence, 1st Earl of Pembroke, (1225-1230 – May 16 or 18, 1296), also 1st Earl of Wexford
- Aymer de Valence, 2nd Earl of Pembroke and Wexford in 1296 (c. 1270 – June 23, 1324), also 2nd Earl of Wexford
