= House monastery =

A house monastery, family monastery or dynastic monastery (German: Hauskloster) is a Christian monastery that has a particular relationship with a noble family.

Often, but not always, what subsequently became the house monastery was founded by the noble family in question. In each case, the family would grant the monastery estates, provide financial support or make other bequests. In doing so they also ensured that family members might be buried and commemorated there. Frequently the chronicles of the abbey would record the donations of the family, but also their histories in general. House monasteries were present in many areas of Europe where nobles held great sway, including Merovingian France, medieval Ireland, and the Holy Roman Empire.

Examples of house monasteries include:

- Merovingians:
  - Basilica of St Denis
- Robertians:
  - Lorsch Abbey
- Carolingians:
  - Prüm Abbey
  - Abbey of St. Medard
- Salians:
  - Abbey of Echternach
- Liudolfinger, Ottonians:
  - Reichenau Abbey
  - Gandersheim Abbey
  - Quedlinburg Abbey
  - Essen Abbey
  - Mauritius Abbey
  - Neuenheerse
- Ascanians:
  - Lehnin Abbey
- Hohenstaufens:
  - Adelberg Abbey
  - Lorch Abbey
- Welfs:
  - Weingarten Abbey
- Habsburgs:
  - Murbach Abbey
  - Ottmarsheim Abbey Church
  - Muri Abbey
  - Königsfelden
- Ezzonids:
  - Brauweiler Abbey
- House of Wettin
  - Altzella Abbey
- House of Zähringen:
  - Abbey of Saint Peter in the Black Forest (from 1093)
- House of Württemberg:
  - Stiftskirche, Stuttgart (since 1321)
- House of Baden:
  - Lichtenthal Abbey in Baden-Baden (1288–1372),
  - Stiftskirche in Baden-Baden (Line of Baden-Baden),
  - Stiftskirche of St. Michael in Pforzheim (line of Baden-Durlach, from 1535),
  - Evangelical Church in Karlsruhe (grand dukes, from 1807)
- House of Fürstenberg (Swabia)
  - Neudingen Abbey
- House of Wittelsbach (Palatine line):
  - Stiftskirche in Neustadt a.d. Weinstraße (14th century),
  - Church of the Holy Spirit, Heidelberg (15th–17th century)
- House of Wittelsbach (Old Bavarian line):
  - Scheyern Abbey,
  - Theatine Church, Munich (from 1663)
- Upper Swabian nobility (Fugger, Waldburg, Montford, Gundelfingen), Tyrol, Alsace and Austrian hereditary lands of Carinthia and Bohemia
  - Buchau Abbey
- Babonians:
  - Walderbach Abbey
