= Henry VI of Luxembourg =

Henry VI
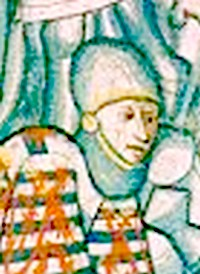

Count of Luxemburg and Arlon
- Reign: 24 December 1281 – 5 June 1288
- Predecessor: Henry V
- Successor: Henry VII
- Born: c. 1240
- Died: 5 June 1288 (aged 48); Worringen
- Spouse: Beatrice d'Avesnes
- Issue more...: Henry VII, Holy Roman Emperor; Baldwin, Archbishop of Trier
- House: Luxembourg
- Father: Henry V, Count of Luxembourg
- Mother: Margaret of Bar

Henry VI (c. 1240 – 5 June 1288) was Count of Luxembourg and Arlon from the death of his father, Henry V the Blond, in 1281 until his own death at the Battle of Worringen, seven years later, when he was succeeded by his son, Henry VII.

== Life ==
Henry was the son of Henry V the Blond and Margaret of Bar. His father took part in Saint Louis's crusade against Tunis and he continued this war, being killed alongside three of his brothers at the Battle of Worringen by a knight of John I, Duke of Brabant.

== Issue ==
Henry married Beatrice d'Avesnes (d. 1 March 1321, daughter of Baldwin and granddaughter of Bouchard IV of Avesnes) around 1260–1 and they had three sons, two of whom attained the highest honours and excellence:

- Henry VII, who was elected King of the Romans in 1308 and Holy Roman Emperor in 1309
- Walram, Lord of Dourlers, Thirimont, and Consorre, died at the siege of Brescia in 1311
- Margaret, Prioress of Marienthal
- Felicitas, Lady of Gaesbeck
- Baldwin, Archbishop-Elector of Trier

== Sources ==
- Gades, John A. (1951). Luxemburg in the Middle Ages. Brill.
- Péporté, Pit (2011). Constructing the Middle Ages: Historiography, Collective Memory and Nation-Building in Luxembourg. Brill.

Henry VI of Luxembourg House of Luxembourg Born: c. 1240 Died: 5 June 1288
Preceded by Henry V	Count of Luxembourg and Arlon; 1281–1288	Succeeded by Henry VII
