= Konrad von Gundelfingen =

Abbot (b. 1266, d. 1302)

Konrad von Gundelfingen (born before 1266; died 1302) was prince-abbot of the Princely Abbey of Kempten from 1284 until 1302 (as Konrad III von Gundelfingen). He was also anti-abbot of the Princely Abbey of Saint Gall from 1288 until 1291, appointed by King Rudolf I.

== Life ==
Rudolf was a member of the House of Gundelfingen, whose ancestral seat Hohen-Gundelfingen is located in modern-day Münsingen in Baden-Württemberg. Konrad is attested as abbot of Kempten from 1284 onward.

Between 10 and 15 October 1288 Konrad was appointed anti-abbot of Saint Gall by King Rudolf of Habsburg when Wilhelm von Montfort was given an Imperial Ban for his policies. A bitter fight for power in and around the territories of the Abbey was fought between the parties. Konrad waged war against Wilhelm, aided by Ulrich von Ramschwag. He gained control over several of the Abbey's important castles, e.g. Clanx Castle in Appenzell, Wildberg Castle, Iberg Castle, as well as Alt-Toggenburg Castle. He was rarely in Saint Gall himself as he frequently travelled in the retinue of the king.

Konrad nearly ruined the Abbey financially, partly by warring against Wilhelm, partly by bringing the financial troubles of Kempten Abbey to Saint Gall. The monastery's properties were sold to keep the war going. When King Rudolf died on 15 July 1291, the situation turned abruptly. Konrad and Ulrich were expelled by the citizenry. Wilhelm von Montfort was able to return, for which he thanked the city in a document on 31 July 1291. Konrad joined the Habsburg league under the knight Jakob von Frauenfeld and tried to capture Schwarzenbach Castle from Wil. The attempt failed, however, and he went back to Kempten. Wilhelm von Montfort and Konrad must have found an agreement, as a settlement of 100 silver marks is recorded for 26 October 1298.

== Reading list ==
- Vogler, Werner (1986). "Kurzbiographien der Äbte". In Duft, Johannes; Gössi, Anton; Vogler, Werner (eds.). Die Abtei St. Gallen. St. Gallen. ISBN 3-906616-15-0.
- Gerold Meyer von Knonau (1898). "Wilhelm von Montfort" . Allgemeine Deutsche Biographie (in German). Vol. 43. Leipzig: Duncker & Humblot. p. 218. (ADB).
- Werner Vogler: Konrad von Gundelfingen, in: Helvetia Sacra. Abt. III: Die Orden mit der Benediktinerregel, Band I: Frühe Klöster, die Benediktiner und Benediktinerinnen in der Schweiz, 2. Teil. Bern 1986, ISBN 3-317-01533-0, pp. 1307-1308.
