= Beatrice of Avesnes =

Beatrice d'Avesnes
- Born: c. 1250
- Died: c.1321
- Noble family: Avesnes
- Spouse: Henry VI, Count of Luxembourg
- Issue: Henry VII, Holy Roman Emperor; Walram; Felicitas; Baldwin of Luxembourg; Margaret
- Father: Baldwin of Avesnes
- Mother: Felicitas of Coucy

Beatrice d'Avesnes (died: 1321) was a daughter of Baldwin of Avesnes and his wife Felicitas of Coucy. Baldwin was the son of Bouchard IV of Avesnes. In 1310, she founded Beaumont Abbey.

Beatrice married, in 1265, Count Henry VI of Luxembourg and was the mother of:

- Henry VII (1274–1313), Count of Luxemburg, King of the Romans in 1308 and Emperor in 1312
- Walram (d. 1311), Lord of Dourlers, Thirimont en Consorre
- Felicitas (d. 1336), married in 1298 John Tristan (d. 1309), Count of Leuven
- Baldwin (1285–1354), Archbishop of Trier (1307–1354)
- Margaret (d. 1336), a nun in Lille and in Marienthal.

== Sources ==
- Gades, John A. (1951). Luxemburg in the Middle Ages. Brill.
- Morganstern, Anne McGee (2000). Gothic Tombs of Kinship in France, the Low Countries, and England. Penn State University Press.
