= Margaret of Brabant =

Queen of Germany from 1308 to 1311

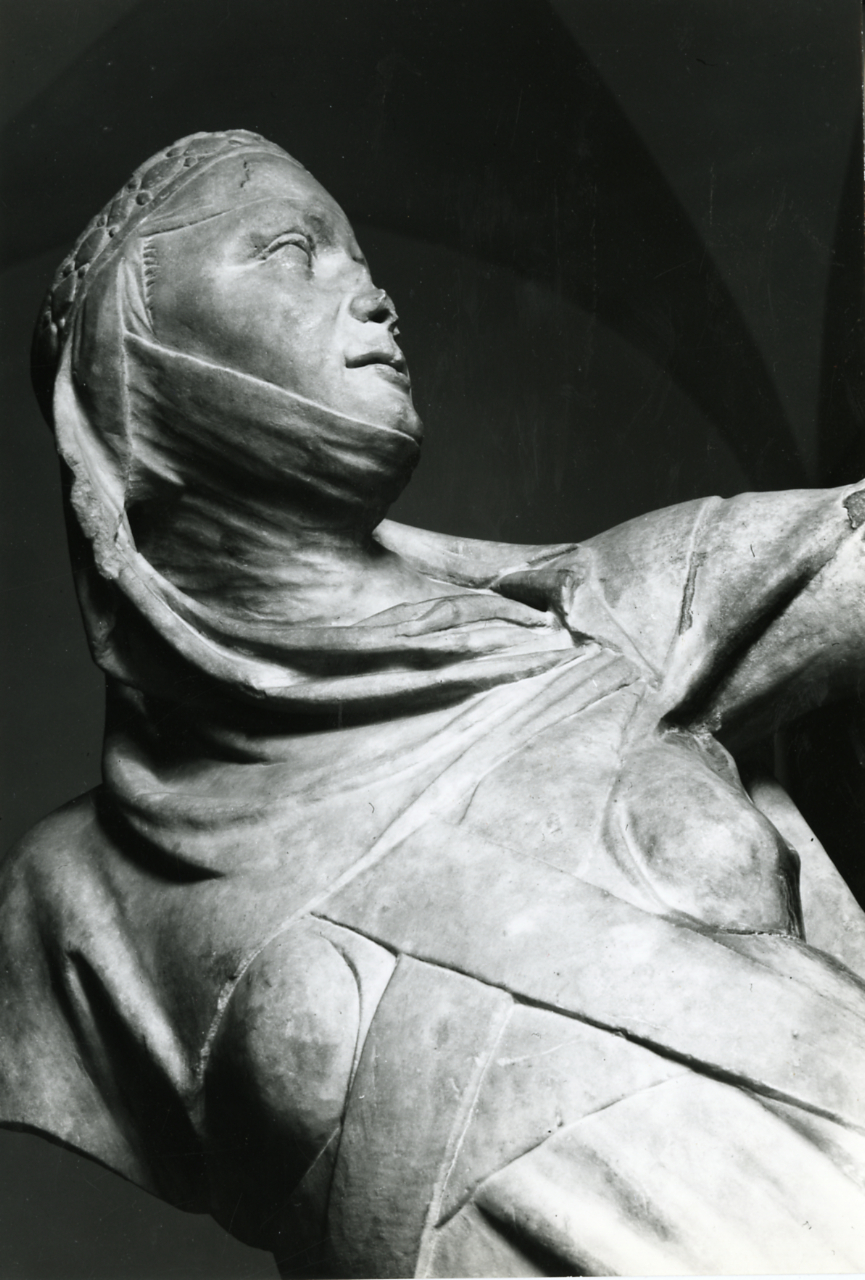
- Giovanni Pisano, Elevatio animae, funerary monument to Queen Margaret, detail, Genoa, Museo di Sant'Agostino, 1313-1314. Photo by Paolo Monti

Queen of the Romans
- Tenure: 27 November 1308 – 14 December 1311
- Born: 4 October 1276
- Died: 14 December 1311 (aged 35); Genoa, Italy
- Spouse: Henry, King of the Romans (m. 1292)
- Issue: John, King of Bohemia; Maria, Queen of France; Beatrix, Queen of Hungary
- House: Reginar
- Father: John I, Duke of Brabant
- Mother: Margaret of Flanders

Margaret of Brabant (4 October 1276 – 14 December 1311), was the daughter of John I, Duke of Brabant and Margaret of Flanders. She was the wife of Henry, Count of Luxembourg, and after his election as King of Germany in 1308, she became Queen of Germany.

== Marriage ==
She was married to Henry on 9 July 1292 which was arranged to settle a long-standing dispute with the Duke of Brabant over the Duchy of Limburg, with the duke abandoning his claim to Limburg at the time Margaret's marriage took place. By all accounts, the marriage proved to be happy. She became the Queen consort of Germany in 1308 when her husband was crowned king.

Henry and Margaret had three children:

- John the Blind (10 August 1296 – 26 August 1346) was the Count of Luxembourg from 1309, King of Bohemia. Married firstly to Elisabeth of Bohemia, by whom he had issue including Charles IV, Holy Roman Emperor, and Bonne of Bohemia, first wife of the future King John II of France. On Elisabeth's death in 1330, John married secondly Beatrice of Bourbon, by whom he had issue.
- Maria (1304 – 26 March 1324), married Charles IV of France, died in childbirth.
- Beatrix (1305 – 11 November 1319), married Charles I of Hungary, died in childbirth.

Margaret accompanied her husband on his Italy campaign, became ill during the siege of Brescia and died a few months later in Genoa, where she was buried in the church of San Francesco di Castelletto. Her death was recorded in the Gesta Baldewini Luczenburch in December 1311. The famous sculptor Giovanni Pisano was commissioned by the Emperor to create a monument in her memory in 1313 (parts of it are still preserved in Genoa, Museo di Sant'Agostino and Galleria Nazionale della Liguria in Palazzo Spinola).

== Sources ==
- Gades, John A. (1951). Luxemburg in the Middle Ages. Brill.

Royal titles
Preceded by Elisabeth of Tirol	German Queen; 1308–1311	Succeeded by Beatrix of Świdnica and Isabel of Aragon
