= Baldwin of Avesnes =

13th-century Flemish nobleman

- Born: September 1219; Oizy (today part of Bièvre)
- Died: 10 April 1295 (aged 75); Avesnes
- Noble family: House of Avesnes
- Spouse: Felicitas of Coucy
- Issue: John of Avesnes; Beatrice of Avesnes
- Father: Bouchard IV of Avesnes
- Mother: Margaret II of Flanders

Baldwin of Avesnes (September 1219 in Oizy – 10 April 1295 in Avesnes) was the son of Bouchard IV of Avesnes and Margaret II of Flanders. His parents' marriage was later declared illegal, because his father had already received minor orders. Baldwin was later declared legitimate by the pope, at the instigation of King Louis IX of France. In 1246, Baldwin received Beaumont as an apanage.

He fought his whole life, together with his brother John I, against his half-brothers from his mother's second marriage with William II of Dampierre. He was said to be responsible for the accident that killed his half-brother William III of Dampierre during a tournament in Trazegnies. After the Edict of Péronne and the death of his brother John, he reconciled with his mother, who sent him to Namur on a revenge expedition.

In 1287, Baldwin sold Dunkirk and Warneton to Guy, Count of Flanders. He is also known as a chronicler; he wrote the Chronique Universelle.

Charles Verlinden identifies the diplomat Baldwin of Hainaut as Baldwin of Avesnes.

== Marriage and issue ==
In 1243, Baldwin married Felicitas (1220-1307), the daughter of Thomas II of Coucy, Lord of Vervins. Baldwin was the father of:

- John (d. 1283), married Agnes of Valence, the daughter of William de Valence, 1st Earl of Pembroke. She was the widow of Hugh de Balliol, the son of John de Balliol
- Beatrice (d. 1321), married in 1281 Henry (d. 1288), the son of Henry V, Count of Luxembourg.

== Sources ==
- Gades, John A. (1951). Luxemburg in the Middle Ages. Brill.
- Giebfried, John (2014). Crusader Constantinople as a Gateway to the Mongol World. Saint Louis Press University.
- Pollock, M. A. (2015). Scotland, England and France After the Loss of Normandy, 1204-1296. The Boydell Press.
