= Dionisie de Munchensi =

Dionisie de Munchensi (born Dionisie de Anesty in the early 13th century; died between 1293 and 1304) was the second wife of landowner Warin de Munchensi, stepmother to Joan de Munchensi (King Henry III's sister-in-law), and addressee of Walter de Bibbesworth's Anglo-Norman language-learning poem The Treatise.

Dionisie de Anesty (her forename is sometimes modernized to Denise) was the daughter and only child of Nicholas de Anesty, a farmer living at Anstey Castle in Hertfordshire. She inherited land from her mother, a descendant of Hamon Peche, Sheriff of Cambridgeshire 1155-1165. Dionisie first married Walter Langton. (This is thought to have been the brother of Stephen Langton, Archbishop of Canterbury: if so he fought in the Albigensian Crusade and would have been about 70 by the time of the marriage.) There were no children of the marriage, and Walter was dead by 1234. In that year Dionisie married Warin de Munchensi, lord of Swanscombe, Painswick, and other estates. Warin's first wife, Joan, daughter of William Marshal, had just died leaving two small children, John and Joan. In 1236 Dionisie bore Warin a son, William de Munchensi.

Warin died in 1255. Dionisie married thirdly Robert Butyller: there were no children of that marriage. She outlived her son William, a turbulent politician who died in 1287. She acted as his executrix and as guardian of her granddaughter, named Dionisie after her, who was still a child when William died.

In 1293 Dionisie endowed a nunnery in the order of Poor Clares at Waterbeach in Cambridgeshire; it was active until 1347 and then merged with the nearby Denny Abbey, newly founded by Joan de Munchensi's daughter-in-law Mary, countess of Pembroke.

Walter de Bibbesworth's Treatise, addressed to Madame Dyonise de Mountechensi, is preceded in some manuscripts by a letter of dedication in which he explains: "You have asked me to put in writing for your children a phrase book to teach them French". Since Dionisie bore only one child, the "children" are assumed to include her two stepchildren, John and Joan.
