= Agnes de Valence =

English noblewoman (1250–1310)

Agnes de Valence (born 1250) was a 13th-century noblewoman and daughter of William de Valence, 1st Earl of Pembroke.

== Family ==
Agnes was born in 1250 and was the youngest daughter of William de Valence and Joan de Munchensi. She was born into a prominent and influential family that was heavily involved in the politics of the 13th century. William de Valence was a French nobleman and Knight with close connections to the Crown, being a half-brother to Henry III of England and uncle to Edward I. Furthermore, her mother Joan was the granddaughter of William Marshal, 1st Earl of Pembroke who had served five successive Kings of England and was herself a wealthy heiress to the Marshal inheritance of Leinster.

== First Marriage ==
During the siege of Kenilworth Castle in 1266, William attempted to make connections with various Irish lords who were taking part in the siege or in pacifying areas of rebel support. Thus William entered into an agreement with Maurice Roe FitzGerald whereby he would marry Agnes and in turn she would receive joint-possession of his Limerick properties. In this way, William received a local ally who would facilitate the maintenance of his Irish interests. Maurice, on the other hand, gained close access to the Crown and the opportunity for royal patronage and favour. The marriage took place in 1266 but did not last long as in 1268 Maurice drowned while crossing from England to Ireland. After the death of her husband, Agnes returned home to her father in England.
By Maurice, Agnes got a son.

== Second and Third Marriages and Death ==
Agnes was swiftly remarried to Scottish magnate Hugh de Balliol, the son of John I de Balliol. The marriage remained childless. Balliol died in Palestine in 1271. By the 1270s, she was married to Jean d'Avesnes, son of Baldwin, Lord of Beaumont, who died in 1283. By him she got four children, two sons and two daughters. She died about five to six years before her third husband.

== Sources ==
- Meek, Christine; Simms, Katharine, eds. (1996). "The Absentee Landlady and the Sturdy Robbers, Medieval Irishwomen in Their European Context". Fragility of Her Sex?: Medieval Irishwomen in Their European Context. Four Courts Press. ISBN 9781851821723.
- Mitchell, Linda E. (2016). Joan de Valence: The Life and Influence of a Thirteenth-Century Noblewoman. Palgrave Macmillan. ISBN 978-0-230-39200-7.
- Sabapathy, John (2014). Officers and Accountability in Medieval England 1170--1300. Oxford University Press. ISBN 978-0-19-964590-9.
