= Walter of Bibbesworth =

English writer of Anglo-Norman verse

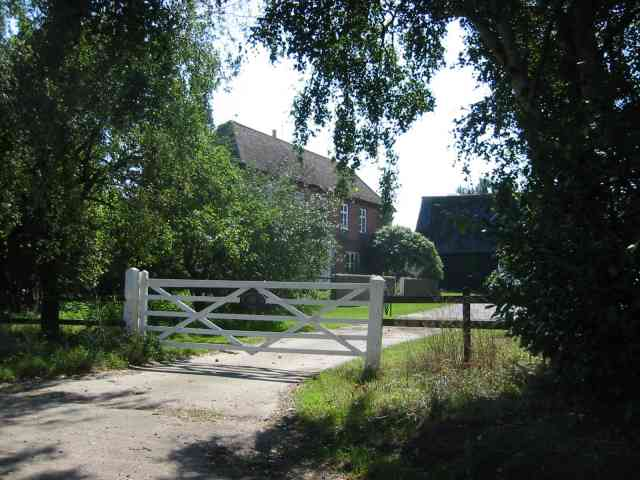
Bibbsworth Hall: the farmhouse (built after Walter's time)

Walter of Bibbesworth (fl. middle of sec.XIII–at least 1277) was an English knight and Anglo-Norman poet. Documents confirm that he held land in the parish of Kimpton, Hertfordshire at the farm now called Bibbsworth Hall ("Bibbs Hall" on some maps). About 1250 he served in Gascony under the seneschal Nicholas de Molis in the army of the English king Henry III. In 1270/1271 he is believed to have taken part in the Ninth Crusade on the evidence of a tençon or poetic argument between himself and Henry de Lacy, 3rd Earl of Lincoln. In the poem Walter, about to depart for Palestine, teases Henry for staying at home for the love of a certain woman. In fact the young Henry de Lacy, "recently married and with heavy responsibilities at home", did not take part in the Ninth Crusade. Walter went and returned. He was buried early in Edward I's reign at Little Dunmow in Essex.

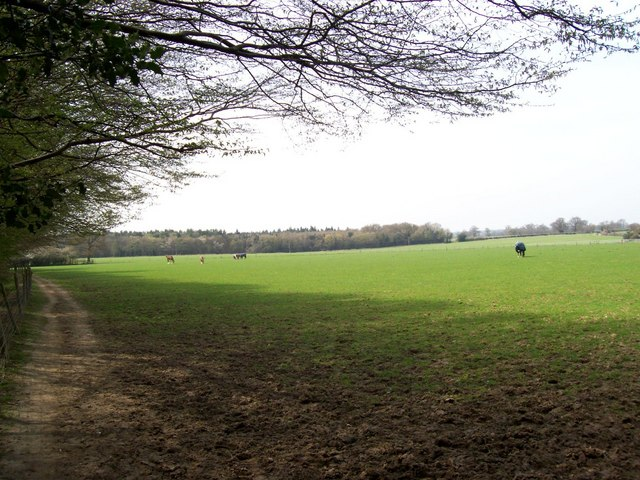
Fields near Bibbsworth Hall, Hertfordshire

Apart from the tençon Walter is best known for a longer poem which in early manuscripts is called Le Tretiz ("The Treatise"), written in medieval French verse and supplied with Middle English glosses between the lines. It is known in two early recensions, one of which has a preface stating that the Treatise was written for madame Dyonise de Mountechensi (Denise or Dionisie de Munchensi) to help her teach her children French. The Treatise gained popularity and was afterwards incorporated in a late medieval textbook of French, Femina Nova. Bibbesworth has also been credited with two other short poems in medieval French, one in praise of beauty, a second on the Virgin Mary, though the first of these is more likely to be the work of Nicole Bozon.

== Works ==
- Le Tretiz ("The Treatise")
- "De bone femme la bounté" (attribution doubtful)
- "Amours m'ount si enchaunté"
- "La Pleinte"
