= Joan de Munchensi =

English noblewoman

- Countess of Pembroke
- Tenure: 1247-1307
- Predecessor: Anselm Marshal
- Successor: Aymer de Valence (as Earl of Pembroke)
- Spouse: William de Valence

Arms of the de Valence Earls of Pembroke

Joan Munchensy (about 1230 - 1307), Countess of Pembroke, was an English noblewoman. The grand-daughter and eventual co-heiress of the celebrated William Marshal, she married William de Valence, half-brother of King Henry III.

== Origins ==
Born about 1230, she was the daughter of Warin de Munchensi (died 1255), of Swanscombe in Kent, and his first wife Joan Marshal (died 1234), daughter of William Marshal (died 1219), Earl of Pembroke, and his wife Isabel Clare (died 1220). Her paternal grandparents were Sir William Munchensy (died 1204) and his wife Aveline Clare (died 1225). She had a brother John Munchensy (died 1247) and a half-brother William Munchensy (died 1287).

== Life ==
After her mother died in 1234 while she was still very young, she was probably looked after by her childless aunt Eleanor of England, daughter of King John of England and widow of William Marshal, 2nd Earl of Pembroke. Her father then married Denise Anstey. When Eleanor married Simon de Montfort in 1238, she was probably taken into the royal nursery.

On the death in 1245 of her uncles Walter Marshal, 5th Earl of Pembroke and Anselm Marshal, 6th Earl of Pembroke, neither leaving children, their extensive estates in England, Wales, and Ireland were divided among seventeen descendants of their father. The process took nearly three years to complete, during which time her brother John died, and she finished up inheriting one-fifth of the total.

Though she was not yet of age to take possession, King Henry III arranged her marriage to William de Valence, youngest of the three sons of his mother Isabella's second marriage to Hugh X of Lusignan, who he had invited to come and live in England. The ceremony took place on 13 August 1247 and her husband was given custody of her lands, which included the lordship of Goodrich in Herefordshire centred on Goodrich Castle, the lordship of Pembroke centred on Pembroke Castle in Wales, and the lordship of Wexford centred on Ferrycarrig Castle in Ireland.

Though she tried to maintain cordial relations with her cousins and coheirs, sharing the common interest of retaining their inherited Marshal lands, her marriage was resented among many of the English nobility, who were dividing into two hostile factions. One group, supporting the king, was led by her husband and by Roger Mortimer, 1st Baron Mortimer, together with his wife Maud de Braose. Their opponents, followers of Simon de Montfort, included Hugh Bigod and other cousins.

When the Parliament of Oxford in 1258 exiled her husband and his brothers and seized her properties without compensation, she apparently confronted Hugh Bigod in public to demand payment. On being refused, she decided to join her husband in exile, after first shipping as many valuables as she could out of the country hidden in sacks of wool.

After de Montfort was killed at Evesham in 1265 and royal power was re-asserted by Prince, later King, Edward, her lands were restored and the influence and standing of her family increased. She improved her three great castles of Goodrich, Pembroke and Ferrycarig and during her husband's many absences abroad, on royal business and on crusade with Prince Edward, ran her widespread estates.

She was also active in arranging marriages for her four surviving children, showing a clear preference for spouses who would continue the Marshal bloodline and keep the heirs connected. For her three children who had died young, it was no doubt she who organised their elaborate tombs in Westminster Abbey and Dorchester Abbey. While disagreements with various Marshal cousins did blow up and subside, she never relented in her legal battles with her half-brother William Munchensy and then with his daughter Denise Munchesny, who had married Hugh de Vere, 1st Baron Vere, over lands she regarded as part of her Munchensy inheritance.

When her husband died unexpectedly in 1296, after being wounded in France, she was a co-executor of his will and was involved in the design and erection of his tomb in Westminster Abbey. In her widowhood, living mostly in her favourite home of Goodrich, she played an even more active part in management of her estates, using a corps of trusted lawyers and officials. Though she never visited Ireland, she was alert to protect her rights there and did not hesitate to appeal to King Edward personally in 1304 when a court judgement went against her.

In her last years, her main concern was for her daughter Joan and her grandchildren in Scotland. In 1299 King Edward had sent her there to visit them, at a time when it was hoped that her son-in-law, John Comyn, would join the English party in opposition to Robert Bruce. When Comyn was murdered in 1306, despite her age she was asked to rescue his orphaned children (their mother was also dead) and to transport them to the safety of the royal nursery at Northampton.

She died shortly before 20 September 1307, probably at Goodrich, leaving two surviving children and about eleven grandchildren. Her heir was her son Aymer. No will has survived and her place of burial is unknown.

== Family ==
She and William had seven children, given here in alphabetical order since dates of birth are uncertain:

- Agnes de Valence (died after 1277) married first in 1266 Maurice Roe FitzGerald (died 1268), secondly in about 1269 Hugh Balliol (died 1271), and thirdly in about 1277 Jean d'Avesnes. She had children in her first and third marriages.
- Aymer de Valence, 2nd Earl of Pembroke (died 1324), married first to Béatrice de Clermont and secondly to Marie de Châtillon-sur-Marne. He left no legitimate children.
- Isabel de Valence (died 1305), married before 1280 John Hastings, 1st Baron Hastings (died 1313) and left children.
- Joan de Valence (died before 1306), married to John Comyn (murdered in 1306), and left children.
- John de Valence (died 1277), childless
- Margaret de Valence, childless
- William de Valence (died in battle in Wales in 1282), childless

== See also ==
- Linda E. Mitchell, Joan de Valence: The Life and Influence of a Thirteenth-Century Noblewoman. Springer, 2016.
