= House of Gundelfingen =

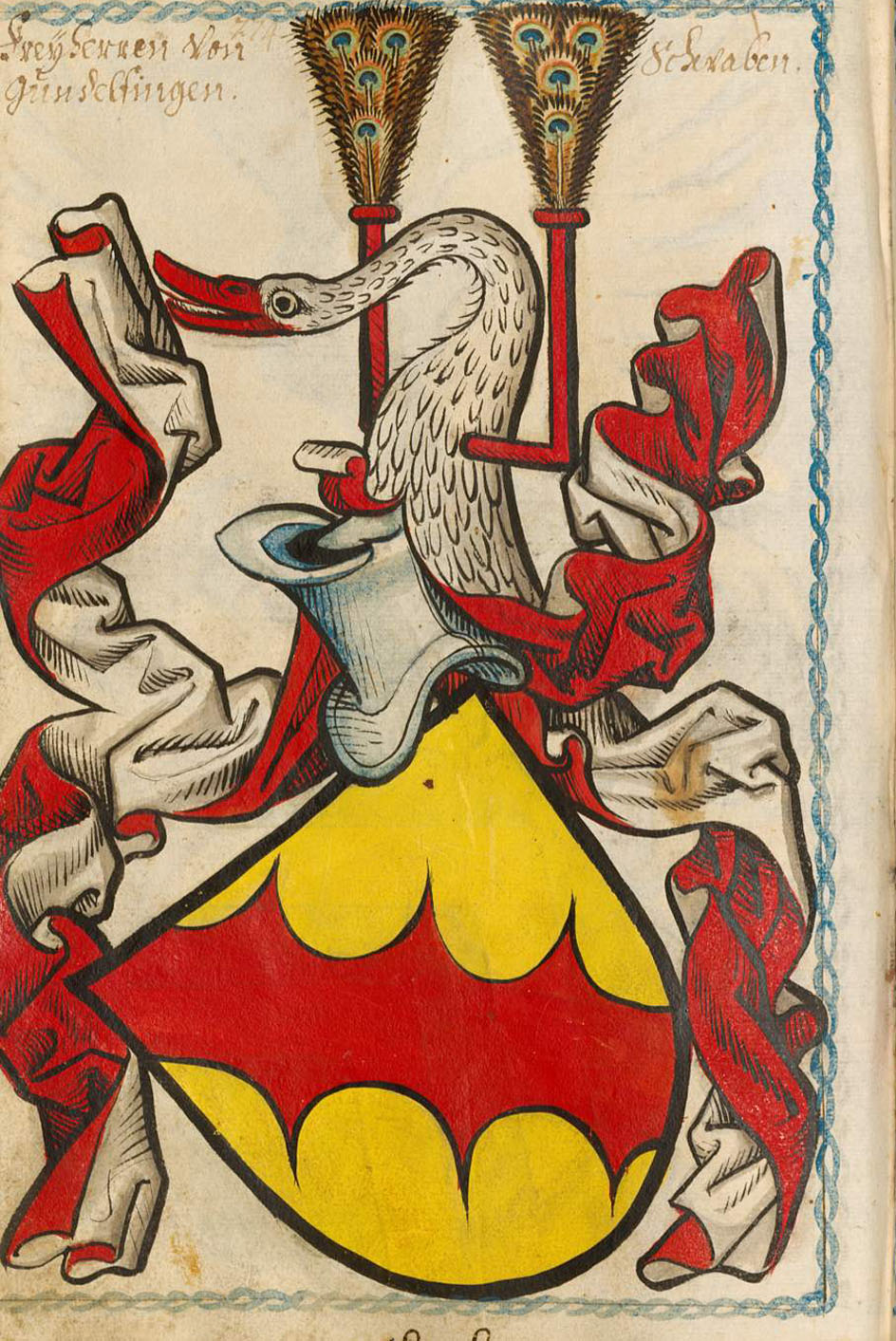
Coat of arms (Scheiblersches Wappenbuch 1450)

The House of Gundelfingen was a Swabian noble family. First recorded in the 11th century, branches of the family held the lordships of Gundelfingen, Steusslingen and Justingen. Their ancestral seat was Burg Hohengundelfingen near Münsingen.

One Swigger von Gundelfingen is recorded in 1105. The division into three branches is a consequence of the turmoils of the interregnum after 1250. Hohengundelfingen castle was sold to the Habsburgs in 1293, with whom the Gundelfinger were in a feudal relationship until 1377. The Gundelfingen family rose to prominence in Swabia and Württemberg in the 15th century. The last representative of the family was Schweikhart von Gundelfingen (d. 1546). After his death, the Gundelfingen possessions passed to the Counts of Helfenstein.

Notable members of the family include

- Konrad von Gundelfingen (1284–1302), as Konrad III prince-abbot of Kempten and anti-abbot of St. Gallen.
- Andreas von Gundelfingen, bishop of Würzburg (1303–1313)
- Konrad von Gundelfingen (Gundelfingen-Hellstein) (ca. 1270–1329), Deutschmeister of the Teutonic Order (1323–1329)
- Heinrich von Gundelfingen, prince-abbot of St Gallen (1411–1418)
- Heinrich von Gundelfingen (d. 1490), historiographer.
- Barbara von Gundelfingen (1473–1523), abbess of Buchau
