= Wilhelm von Montfort =

Prince-Abbot of St. Gall

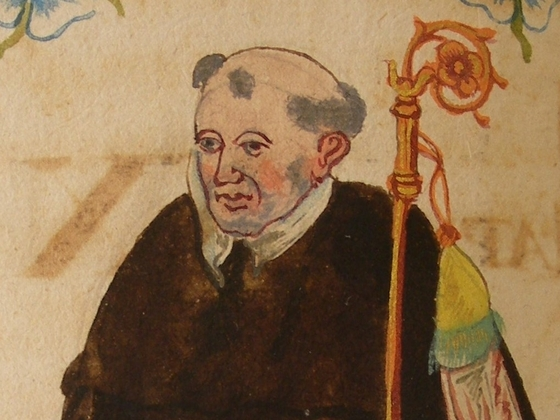
Wilhelm von Montfort (around 1300)

Wilhelm I Count of Montfort (died 11 October 1301) was prince-abbot of Saint Gall from 1281 until 1301.

== Political situation at the end of the 13th century ==
By the end of the abbacy of Berchtold von Falkenstein (died 10 June 1272), Count Rudolf of Habsburg began to restrict the influence the abbey had on the region of Thurgau. An election for the successor of Berchtold ended in conflicting results, giving Rudolf the opportunity to seize more influence and become more involved in matters of the abbey (he was crowned king in 1273). Rudolf sided with Ulrich von Güttingen, who was elected abbot by the citizens of the city of St. Gallen. The convent, however, had chosen Heinrich von Wartenberg, whom the citizenry rejected on the grounds of being from the same family as Berchtold. The Gotteshausleute (inhabitants of the area of influence of the Abbey), especially the city of St. Gallen, which at the time had not yet gained independence from the Abbey, accepted Rudolf as protector, which was confirmed to them in a Handfeste. However, Rudolf appointed Ulrich von Ramschwag as advocatus over the princely abbey. Additionally, Ulrich was a bad economist who amassed a large amount of debt for the city, in large parts due to his warring efforts against Heinrich von Wartenberg. Ulrich also fought against Heinrich's successor, Rumo von Ramstein. When Ulrich died, everybody recognised Rumo as the only legitimate abbot. The Abbey's economic standing did not improve, however, as Rumo had to sell many treasures to pay the amassed debt and was generally seen as inept. He abdicated in 1281 when he could not handle the situation any longer.

== Tenure ==
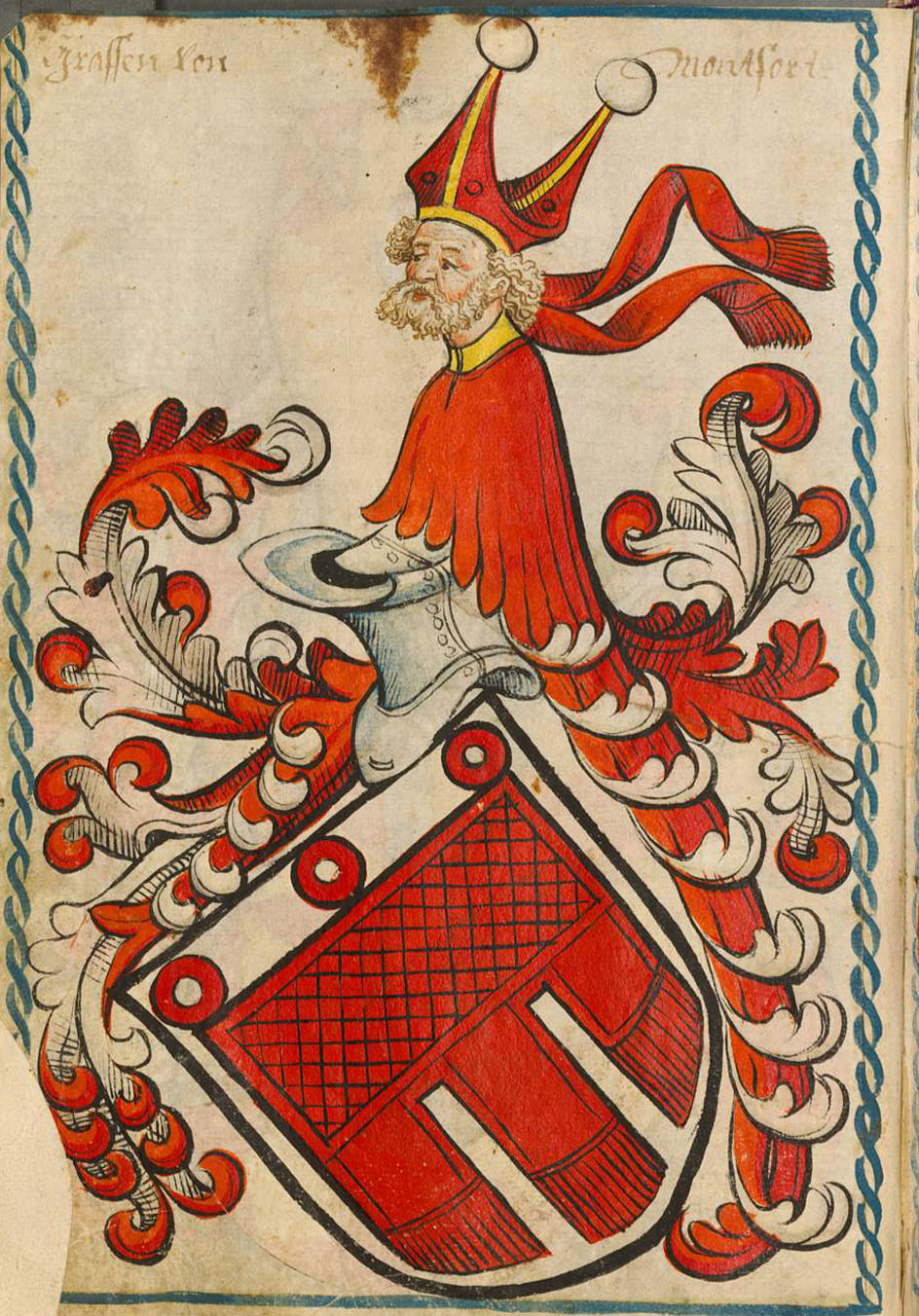
Coat-of-arms of the counts of Montfort

Wilhelm's election signalled a systemic change for Saint Gall. He was elected abbot from the dynasty of the counts of Montfort, which was hostile towards the abbey during Berchtold's abbacy and sided with Ulrich during the time of double rule. While the spreading influence of the Montforts from the Rheintal to the Argengau had been a point of contention between the house and the convent, the electorate now sought to use the name of the counts for their own benefit. Wilhelm had influential secular brothers who boosted his election, among which were Rudolf I von Montfort and Ulrich I von Montfort, as well as the later bishop of Chur, Friedrich von Montfort. After the election, Wilhelm endeavored to restore the Abbey's former glory. Those ambitions were stopped by King Rudolf who—after clashing with the strong-willed abbot—soon grew more hostile, forcing Wilhelm to interrupt his first visit at the royal court in Augsburg, in December 1282, to avoid further impositions from the king. Inhabitants of the abbey were so unhappy with Wilhelm's strict fiscal policies, and his orders that every monk should be ordained priest, that they lodged a complaint at the royal court. Their accusations were backed by the court, and in 1287, Rudolf constricted Saint Gall's access to secular goods and used his influence on a papal legate to impose an anathema on Wilhelm.

The king had built the castle Schwarzenbach as a stronghold against the city of Wil, an important trading center of the Gotteshaus (area under rule of the Abbey). A fierce fight erupted there in August and September 1287. An agreement of atonement was settled outside of Wil on 6 September 1287. However, when Wilhelm visited the king to finalize the peace, the agreement fell through and Rudolf forced Wilhelm to make further concessions towards the king's sons Albert I and Rudolf II. Spurred by this, Wilhelm continued the fight, assisted by his brother, Bishop Friedrich. The king placed more interest into Ulrich von Ramschwag. When the ruling that Wilhelm was to be excommunicated was finalized, the king, followed by his sons Albert and Rudolf, appointed the abbot of Kempten, Konrad von Gundelfingen, to be "anti-abbot". Supporters of Wilhelm were threatened with the imperial ban if they continued their support.

Count Rudolf II stayed behind to fight Wilhelm, who now had to endure a time of defeat and persecution. His castles, among which was castle Alt-Toggenburg, fell into enemy hands. One after the other, his refuges were lost or became unusable. Bishop Friedrich was captured in a battle and died in 1290 when he attempted to escape from Werdenberg castle, which was controlled by Hugo von Montfort, who was on the king's side. When King Rudolf died on 15 July 1291, Wilhelm immediately sought negotiations with the citizens of the city of St. Gall, promising to restore their old rights. They promptly reinstated him as the only legitimate abbot on 25 July of the same year. He thanked the citizenry by formalising their rights on 31 July 1291 in a comprehensive treaty.

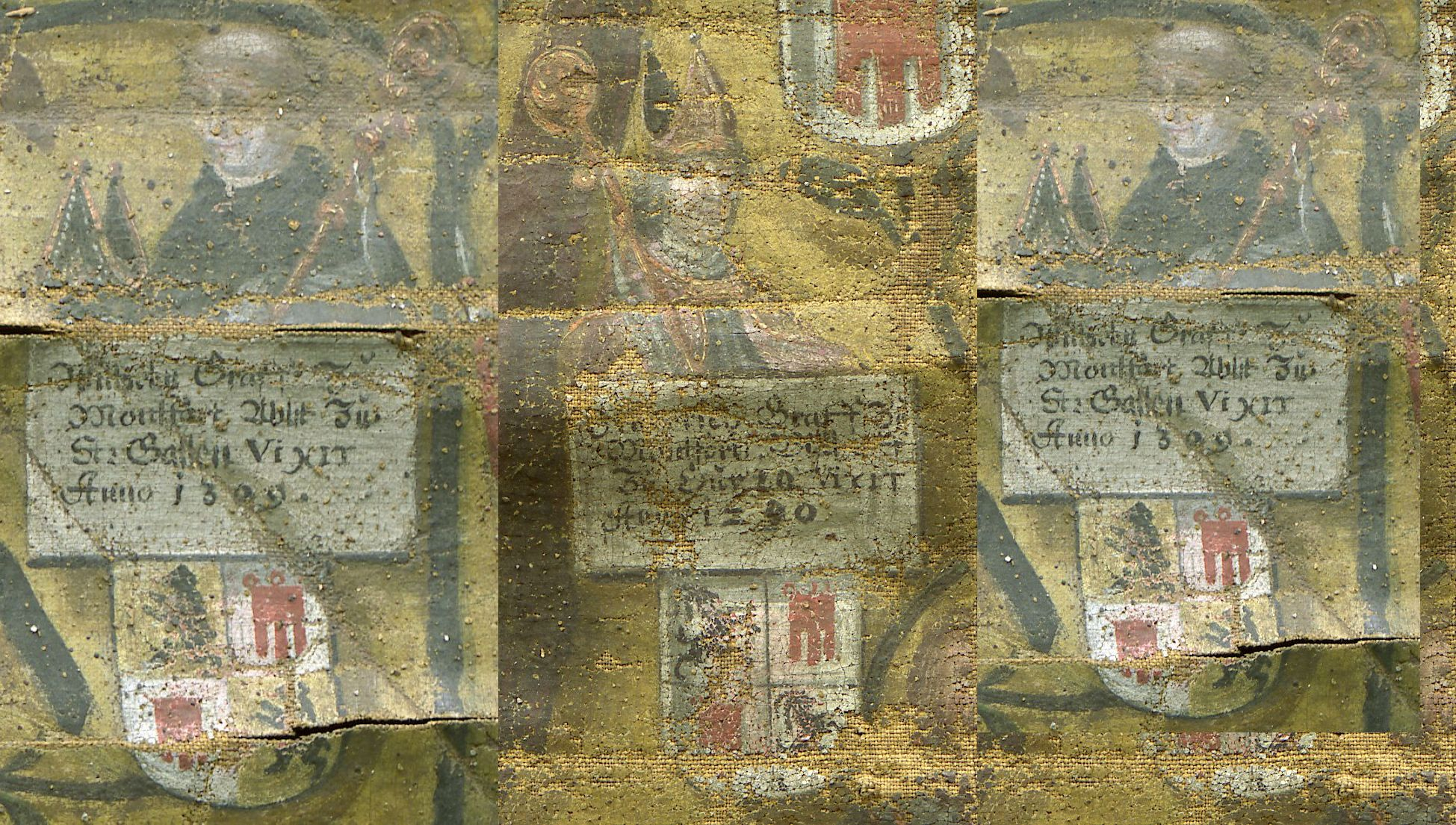
Friedrich II († 1290, left), Henry III († 1307, middle), and Wilhelm I von Montfort († 1301, right)

Konrad von Gundelfingen had to leave his post. He tried to re-establish himself as abbot through martial means, but relented when Wilhelm paid him 100 Mark. Wilhelm, along with other enemies of the late king, joined an alliance against count Albert which was being assembled by bishop Rudolf von Konstanz. Subsequently, war erupted again in the Gotteshaus. Albert was largely victorious, but Ulrich von Ramschwag's sons – Ulrich himself had been driven out of the city when Wilhelm returned – suffered a major defeat outside the city of St. Gall on 15 February 1292. Following these events, the conflict was seemingly de-escalating, but never ceased entirely. In 1296, Wilhelm travelled to Austria to negotiate a peace treaty, but had to leave without satisfying the hopes of St. Gall.

When a feud broke out between Albert and King Adolf of Germany, who was Rudolf I's successor, Wilhelm joined forces with the new king, as he had shown himself to be beneficial towards St. Gall. After being granted assurances in the treaty of Schletstatt of 1 September 1297, the abbot consulted with King Adolf in the vicinity of Frankfurt to support him in his campaign against Albert I. In the summer of 1298, Wilhelm was the only clerical ruler (Pfaffenfürst) in Adolf's camp. On 2 July, at the battle of Göllheim, Wilhelm was one of the fugitives from the battlefield. Defeated and faced with economic difficulties due to the military expenditures and losses, he returned to the abbey. Moreover, the old enemy, Albert I, was now king. Only in 1301 could the questions raised about Schwarzenbach, disputed since 1292, be brought before and resolved by the new king. According to the contents of the contract, the implementation of which would be delayed and never completely finalized, the castle and the city of Schwarzenbach should have been broken up and the city of Wil would have been completely restored. However, Wilhelm had already fallen ill by the time Bishop Heinrich von Konstanz could report the settlement; he died on 11 October, five days before the completion of the peace treaty.

== Reading list ==
- Meyer von Knonau (1898). "Wilhelm von Montfort". Allgemeine Deutsche Biographie (in German). Vol. 43. Leipzig: Duncker & Humblot. p. 218. (ADB). Band 43, Duncker & Humblot, Leipzig 1898, S. 218.
- Duft, Johannes: Die Abtei St. Gallen, St. Gallen 1986.
- Henggeler, P. Rudolf (1929). Professbuch der fürstl. Benediktinerabtei der heiligen Gallus und Otmar zu St. Gallen. St. Gallen.
