= Henry VII, Holy Roman Emperor =

Holy Roman Emperor from 1312 to 1313

Henry VII
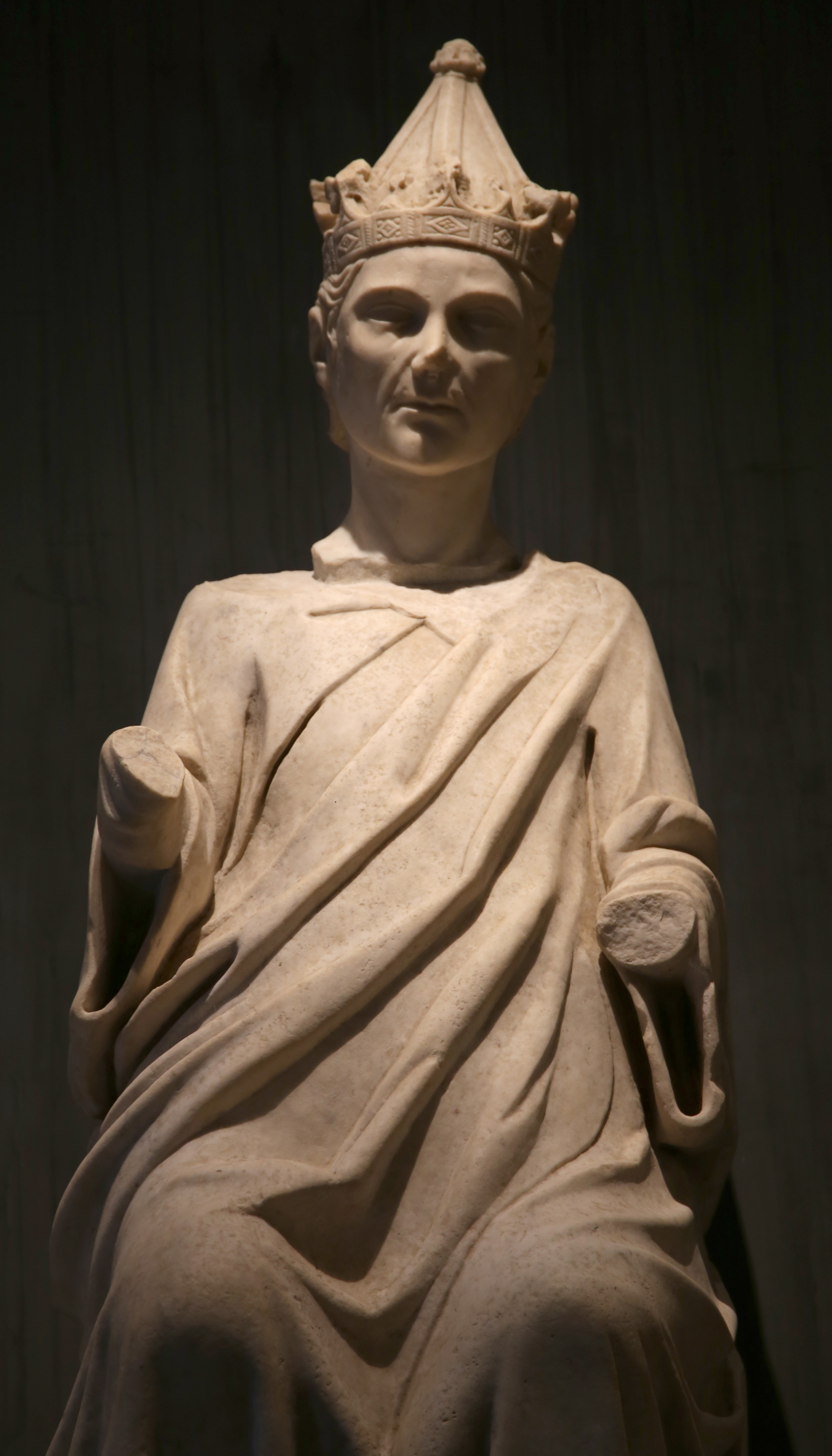
- Statue by Tino di Camaino, 1313

Holy Roman Emperor
- Reign: 29 June 1312 – 24 August 1313
- Coronation: 29 June 1312, Rome
- Predecessor: Frederick II
- Successor: Louis IV

King of the Romans
- Reign: 27 November 1308 – 24 August 1313
- Coronation: 6 January 1309, Aachen
- Predecessor: Albert I
- Successor: Louis IV

King of Italy
- Reign: 6 January 1311 – 24 August 1313
- Coronation: 6 January 1311, Milan
- Predecessor: Conrad IV
- Successor: Louis IV

Count of Luxembourg and Arlon
- Reign: 5 June 1288 – 24 August 1313
- Predecessor: Henry VI
- Successor: John I
- Born: probably between 1275 and 1278/79; Valenciennes, County of Hainaut
- Died: 24 August 1313 (aged 38); Buonconvento, Italy
- Burial: Duomo di Pisa, Pisa
- Spouse: Margaret of Brabant (m. 1292; died 1311)
- Issue: John, King of Bohemia; Marie, Queen of France; Beatrice, Queen of Hungary
- House: House of Luxembourg
- Father: Henry VI of Luxembourg
- Mother: Beatrice d'Avesnes

Henry VII (Note: German: Heinrich; Italian: Arrigo or Enrico.) (1275 or 1278/79 – 24 August 1313) was the King of Germany from 1308 and Holy Roman Emperor from 1312. He was the first emperor of the House of Luxembourg. During his brief career he reinvigorated the imperial cause in Italy, which was racked with the partisan struggles between the divided Guelph and Ghibelline factions, and inspired the praise of Dino Compagni and Dante Alighieri. He was the first emperor since the death of Frederick II in 1250, ending the Great Interregnum of the Holy Roman Empire; however, his premature death threatened to undo his life's work. His son, John of Bohemia, failed to be elected as his successor, and there was briefly another anti-king, Frederick the Fair, who contested the rule of Louis IV.

== Life ==
=== Election as King of the Romans ===
Arms of the House of Luxembourg.

Born probably between 1275 or 1278/79 in Valenciennes, he was a son of Count Henry VI of Luxembourg and Béatrice from the House of Avesnes. Raised at the French court, he was the lord of comparatively small properties in a peripheral and predominantly French-speaking part of the Holy Roman Empire. It was symptomatic of the empire's weakness that during his rule as the Count of Luxembourg, he agreed to become a French vassal, seeking the protection of King Philip the Fair of France. During his rule of Luxembourg, he ruled effectively, especially in keeping the peace in local feudal disputes.

Arms of Henry VII, Holy Roman Emperor.

Henry became caught up in the internal political machinations of the Holy Roman Empire with the assassination of King Albert I on 1 May 1308. Almost immediately, King Philip of France began aggressively seeking support for his brother, Charles of Valois, to be elected the next King of the Romans. Philip thought he had the backing of the French Pope Clement V (established at Avignon), and that his prospects of bringing the empire into the orbit of the French royal house were good. He lavishly spread French money in the hope of bribing the German electors. Although Charles of Valois had the backing of Henry, Archbishop of Cologne, a French supporter, many were not keen to see an expansion of French power, least of all Clement V. The principal rival to Charles appeared to be Rudolf, the Count Palatine.

Given his background, although he was a vassal of Philip the Fair, Henry was bound by few national ties, an aspect of his suitability as a compromise candidate among the electors, the great territorial magnates who had lived without a crowned emperor for decades, and who were unhappy with both Charles and Rudolf. Henry's brother, Baldwin, Archbishop of Trier, won over a number of the electors, including the Archbishop of Cologne, in exchange for some substantial concessions. Consequently, Henry skillfully negotiated his way to the crown, elected with six votes at Frankfurt on 27 November 1308. The only elector who did not support him was Henry, King of Bohemia. Henry was subsequently crowned at Aachen on 6 January 1309.

In July 1309, Pope Clement V confirmed Henry's election. He agreed to crown Henry emperor at Candlemas 1312 personally, the title having been vacant since the death of Frederick II. Henry in exchange, swore an oath of protection to the Pope, agreed to defend the rights and not attack the privileges of the cities of the Papal States, and also agreed to go on Crusade once he had been crowned emperor. Yet the newly crowned king had local issues to deal with before he could seek the imperial crown. Henry was approached by part of the Bohemian nobility and some important and influential ecclesiastics to intervene in Bohemia. Unhappy with the rule of Henry of Carinthia, and wary of the claims of the Habsburgs who had some legitimate claim on the crown, they convinced Henry to marry his son John I, Count of Luxemburg to Elizabeth, the daughter of Wenceslas II, and so establish a claim to the Bohemian crown. In July 1310 he engineered the removal of Henry of Carinthia.

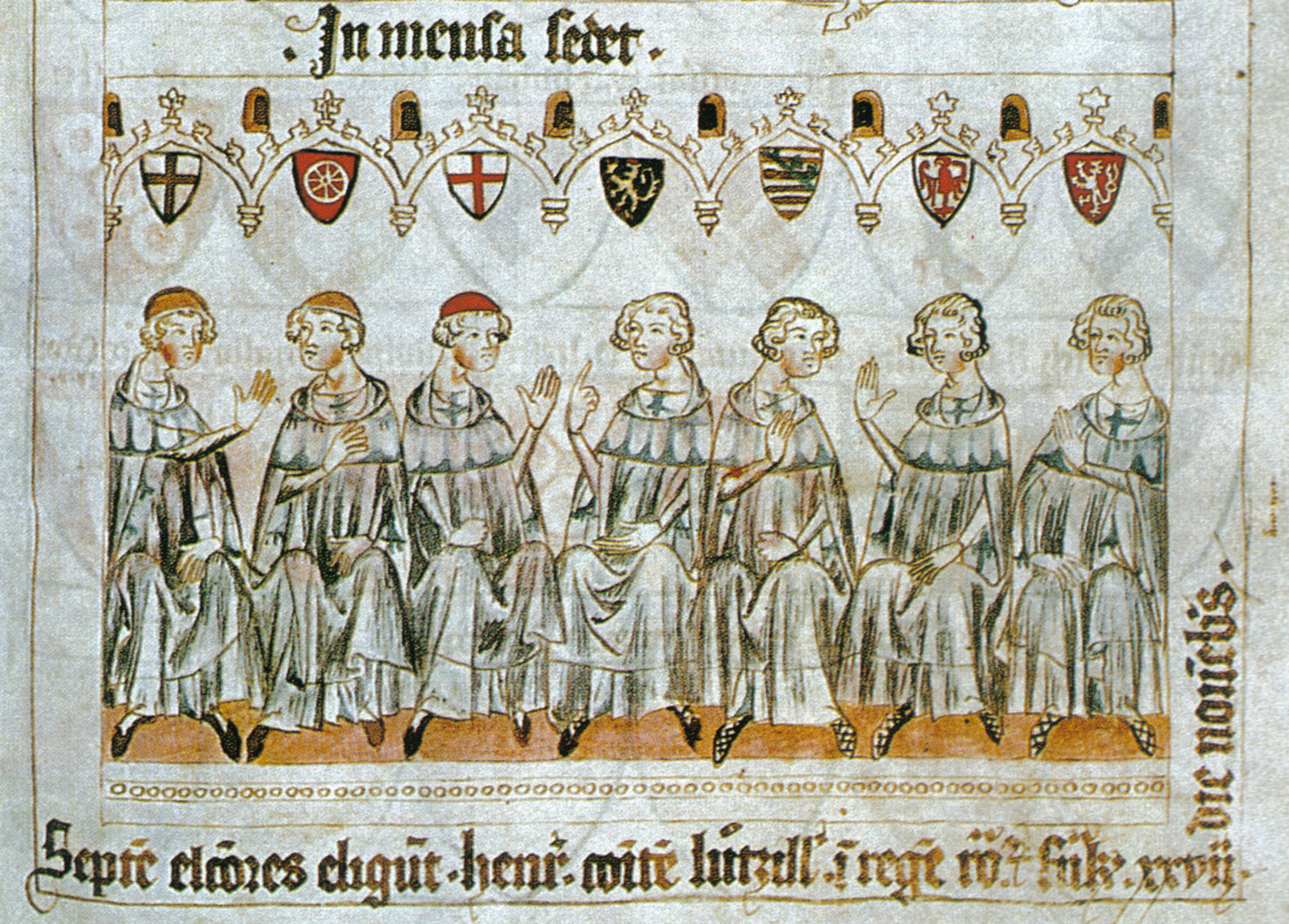
The seven prince-electors voting for Henry, Balduineum picture chronicle, 1341

On 15 August 1309, Henry VII announced his intention to travel to Rome, having sent his ambassadors to Italy to prepare for his arrival, and so consequently expected his troops to be ready to travel by 1 October 1310. Prior to leaving Germany, he sought to smooth relations with the Habsburgs, who had been forced against their will to accept the accession of Henry's son in Bohemia, cowed by the threats of making the Duchy of Austria dependent on the Bohemian crown. He therefore confirmed them in their imperial fiefs by October 1309; in exchange, Leopold of Habsburg agreed to accompany Henry in his Italian expedition, and to provide a body of troops as well.

Henry felt he needed to obtain a papal imperial coronation, partly because of the lowly origins of his house, and partly because of the concessions he had been forced to make to obtain the German crown in the first place. He also saw it, together with the crowns of Italy and Arles, as a necessary counterweight to the ambitions of the French king. To ensure the success of his Italian expedition, Henry entered into negotiations with Robert, King of Naples in mid-1310, with the intent of marrying his daughter, Beatrix to Robert's son, Charles, Duke of Calabria. It was hoped that this would lessen the tensions in Italy between the anti-imperial Guelphs, who looked to the King of Naples for leadership, and the pro-imperial Ghibellines. Negotiations broke down due to Robert's excessive monetary demands, as well as through the interference of Philip, who did not want such an alliance to succeed.

=== Descent into Italy ===
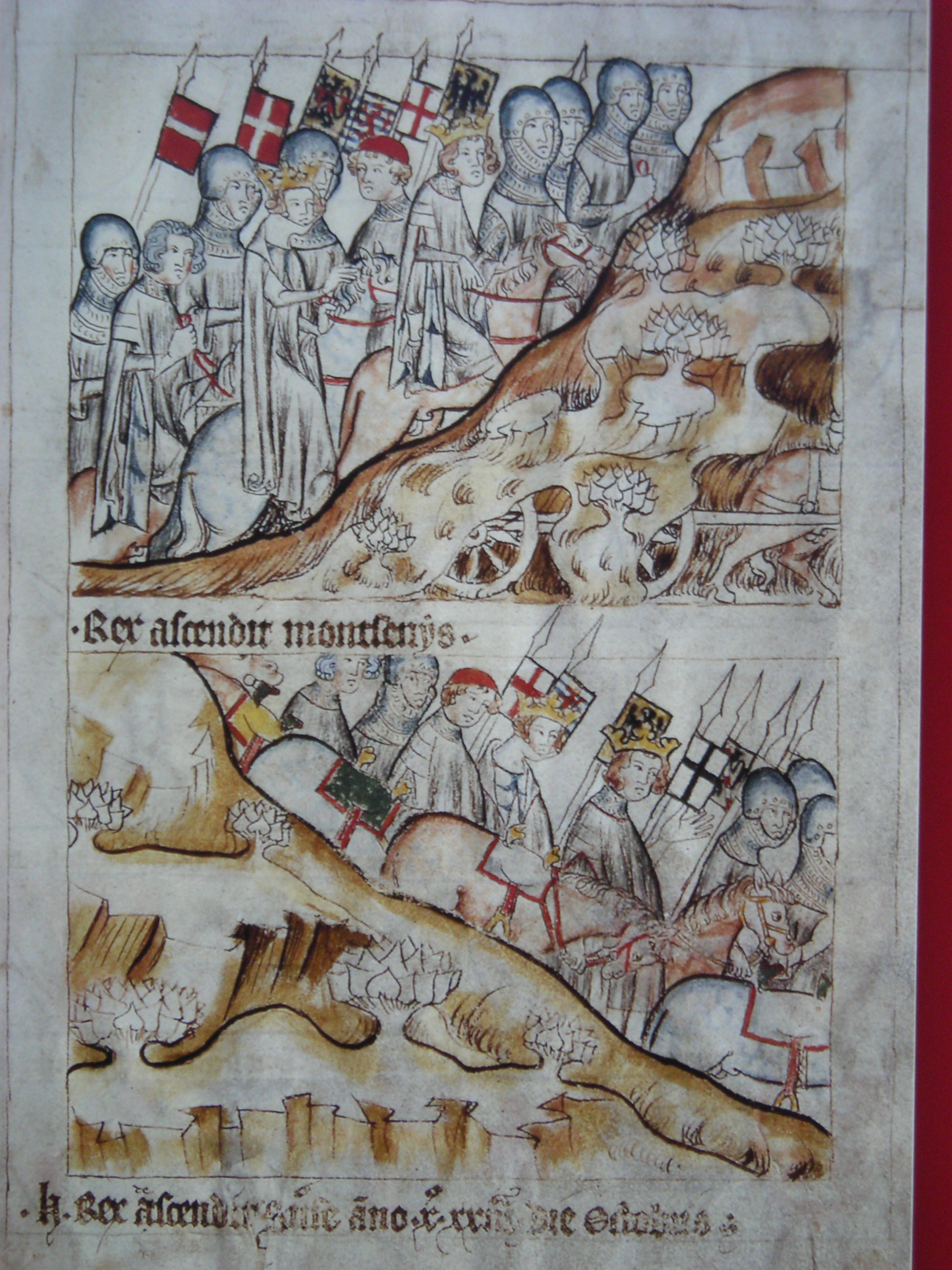
Henry VII and the Imperial army crossing the Alps into Italy

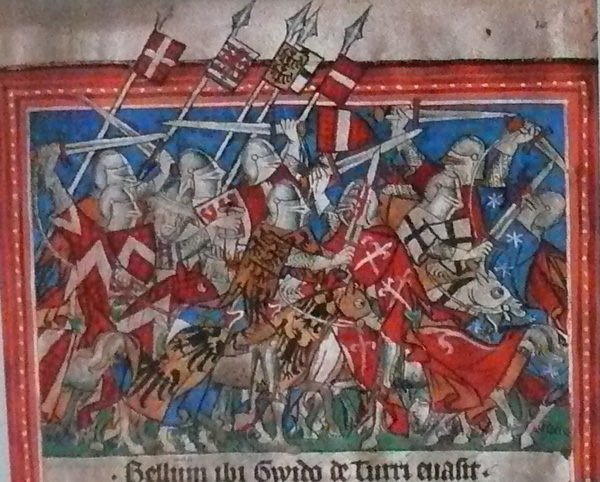
The knights of emperor Henry VII defeat the Guelph faction of Guido della Torre in Milan

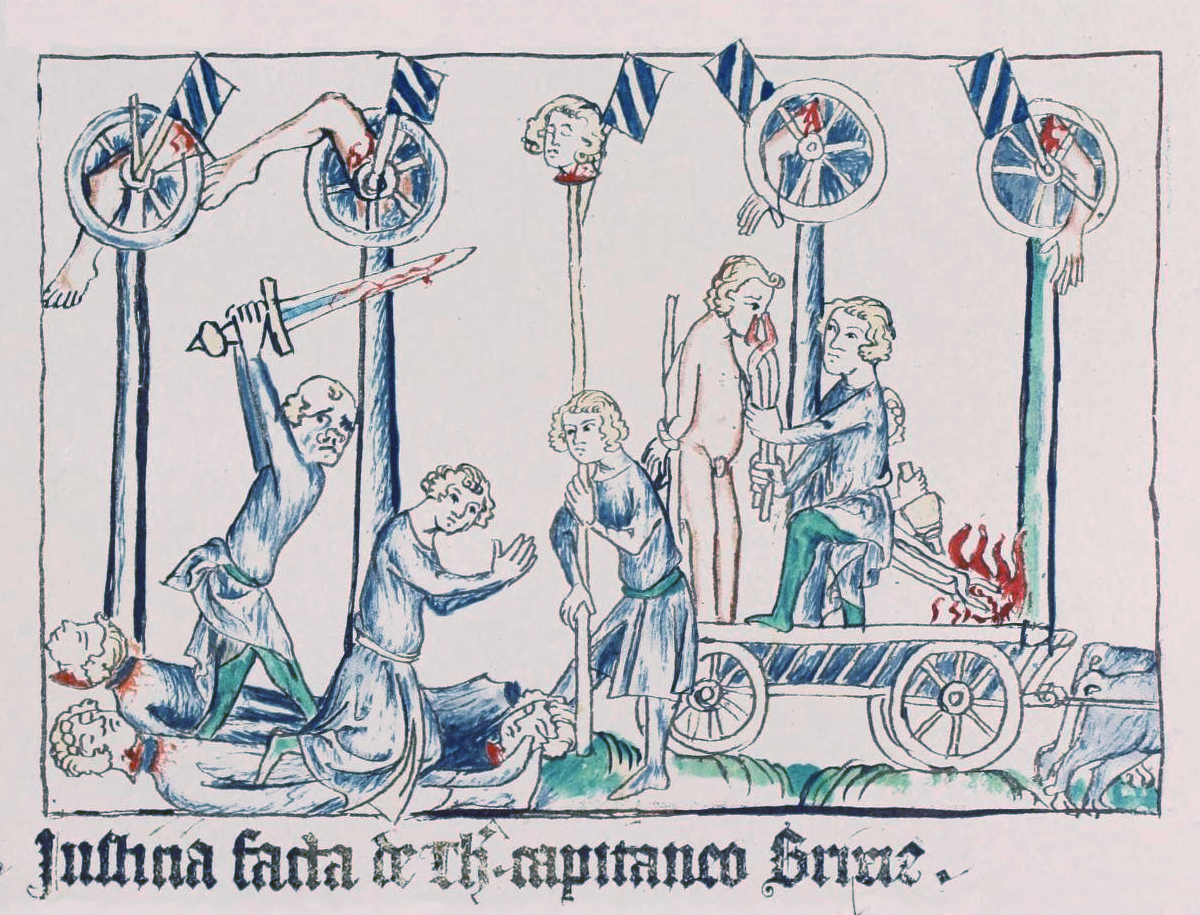
Torture and execution of the Guelph captain Teobaldo Brusati at the siege of Brescia

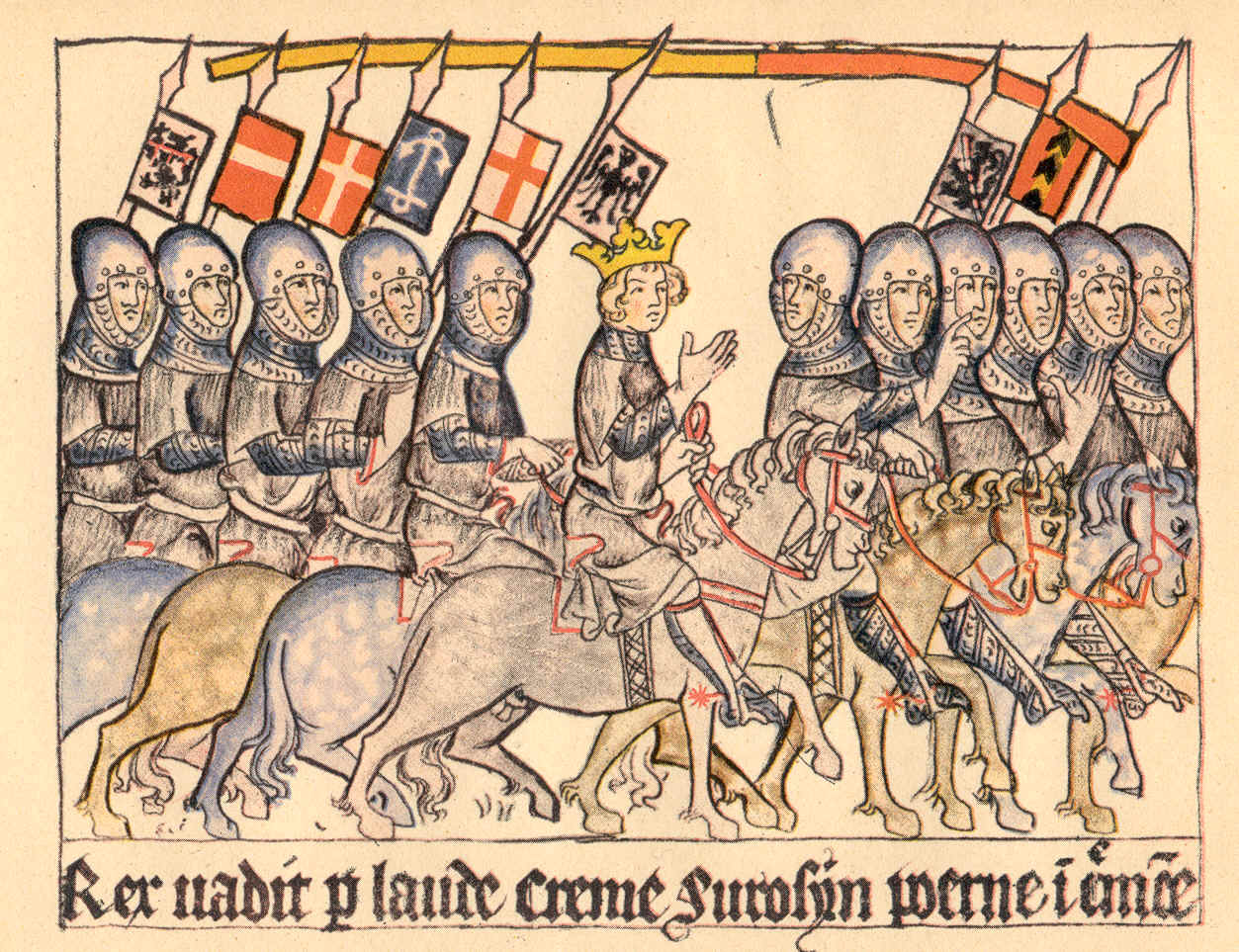
The Emperor in Italy.

While these negotiations were taking place, Henry began his descent into northern Italy in October 1310, with his eldest son John remaining in Prague as the Imperial vicar. As he crossed the Alps and travelled into the Lombard plain, nobles and prelates of both Guelph and Ghibelline factions hastened to greet him, and Dante circulated an optimistic open letter addressed to the rulers and the people. As emperor, Henry had planned to restore the glory of the Holy Roman Empire, but he did not reckon on the bitterly divided state that Italy had now become. Decades of warfare and strife had seen the rise of dozens of independent city-states, each one nominally Guelph or Ghibelline, backed by either urban nobles supporting a powerful ruler (such as Milan), or the rising non-noble merchant classes embedded in oligarchic republican states (such as Florence). Each of these contests had created bitter losers, each of whom looked to the emperor-elect for restitution. Henry expressed both his high-minded idealism and lack of political craft in his plan to require all the cities of Lombardy to welcome back their exiles, of whatever their political stripe. He received both parties, Guelph or Ghibelline, courteously; in the beginning he showed no obvious favoritism to either party, hoping that his magnanimity would be reciprocated by both sides. Nevertheless, he insisted that the current rulers in all of the Italian city-states had usurped their powers. He insisted that the towns should come under the immediate control of the Empire, and that their exiles should be recalled. He eventually forced the cities to comply with his demands, and the despots had to surrender their keys. Although Henry rewarded their submission with titles and fiefs, it did cause a great deal of resentment that only grew over time. This was the situation confronting the king when he arrived in Turin in November 1310, at the head of 5,000 soldiers, including 500 cavalry.

After a brief stay at Asti where Henry intervened in the political affairs in the town, much to the consternation of the Italian Guelphs, Henry proceeded to Milan, where he was crowned King of Italy with the Iron Crown of Lombardy on 6 January 1311. The Tuscan Guelphs refused to attend the ceremony, and began preparing for resistance to Henry's imperial dreams. As part of his program of political rehabilitation, he recalled the Visconti, the ousted former rulers of Milan from exile. Guido della Torre, who had thrown the Visconti out of Milan, objected and organised a revolt against Henry that was ruthlessly put down, and the Visconti were returned to power, with Henry appointing Matteo I Visconti as the Imperial vicar of Milan. He also imposed his brother-in-law, Amadeus of Savoy, as the vicar-general in Lombardy. These measures, plus a massive levy imposed on the Italian towns, caused the Guelph cities to turn against Henry, and he encountered further resistance when he sought to enforce imperial claims on what had become communal lands and rights, and attempted to replace communal regulations with imperial laws. Nevertheless, Henry managed to restore some semblance of imperial power in parts of northern Italy. Cities such as Parma, Lodi, Verona and Padua all accepted his rule.

At the same time any resistance of the north Italian communes was ruthlessly suppressed; however, the punishments levied on cities that submitted stiffened the resistance of others. Cremona was the first to feel Henry's wrath, after the Torriani family and their supporters had fled from Milan, falling on 26 April 1311, after which he razed the city walls. Henry then expended much of his initial capital of good-will with delays, such as the four-month siege of Brescia in 1311, delaying his journey to Rome. Popular opinion began to turn against Henry, with Florence allying itself with the Guelph communities of Lucca, Siena and Bologna, and engaging in a propaganda war against the king. This was successful in that Pope Clement V, under increasing pressure from King Philip of France, began to distance himself from Henry and to take up the cause of the Italian Guelphs who had been appealing to the Papacy for support.

Despite plague and desertions, he managed to extract Brescia's surrender in September 1311. Henry then passed through Pavia before arriving in Genoa, where he again tried to mediate between the warring factions within the town. During his stay in the city, his wife Margaret of Brabant died. Also while in Genoa he discovered that King Robert of Naples had decided to oppose the spread of imperial power in the Italian peninsula, and resumed his traditional position as head of the Guelph parties, as Florence, Lucca, Siena and Perugia all declared their support for Robert. Henry attempted to intimidate Robert by ordering him to attend his imperial coronation, and to swear fealty for his imperial fiefs in Piedmont and Provence. With Florence's encouragement, much of Lombardy flared into open rebellion against Henry, with uprisings throughout December 1311 and January 1312, while in the Romagna, King Robert strengthened his position. Nevertheless, Henry's supporters managed to capture Vicenza, and he received an embassy from Venice, who offered him the friendship of their city. Henry also began legal proceedings against Florence, laying charges of Lèse majesté against the city and placing it under an Imperial ban in December 1311.

After spending two months in Genoa, Henry continued on to Pisa by ship, where he was eagerly received by the inhabitants, who were the traditional enemies of Florence and were Ghibelline. Here he again began negotiating with Robert of Naples, before deciding to enter into an alliance with Frederick III of Sicily, strengthening his position and hopefully putting pressure on Robert of Naples. He left Pisa in 1312 to go to Rome to be crowned as emperor, but on his way he discovered that Clement V was not going to crown him there.

=== Wars against Florence and Robert of Naples ===
Rome was in a state of confusion as Henry approached the city walls. The Orsini family had adopted the cause of Robert of Naples, while the Colonna family threw their weight behind Henry. With their partisans fighting in the streets, Henry was also confronted with the news that the Castel Sant'Angelo and the Vatican quarter were securely in the hands of Robert, the Angevin king of Naples, who had decided, with help from the Florentines that his own dynastic interests were not in favour of renewed Imperial presence in Italy.

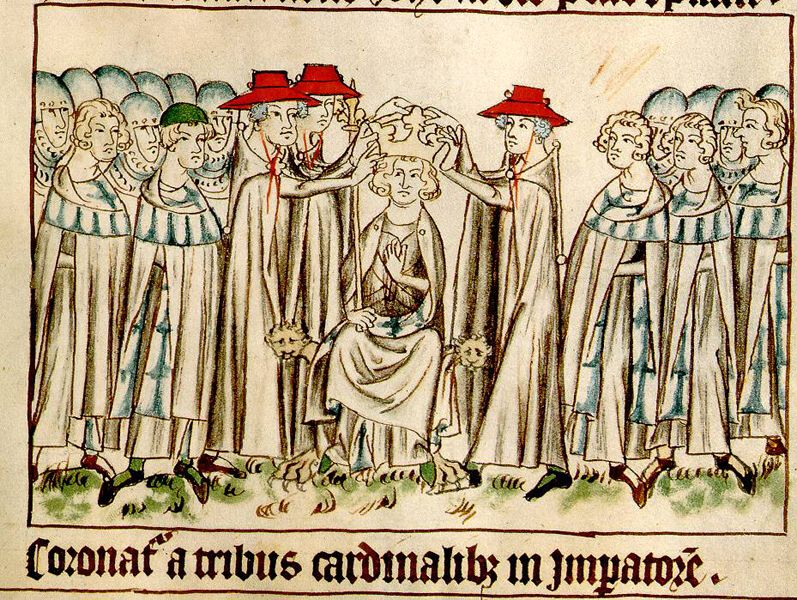
The Coronation of Henry VII by three cardinals.

On 7 May 1312, Henry's German troops forced their way across the Ponte Milvio and entered Rome, but found it impossible to throw out the Angevin troops from around St. Peter's Basilica. As the Colonna family had possession of the area around the Basilica of St. John Lateran, Santa Maria Maggiore and the Colosseum, Henry was forced to perform his coronation on 29 June 1312 at the Lateran. The ceremony was performed by three Ghibelline cardinals who had joined Henry on his way through Italy. The imperial party was fired upon by hostile crossbowmen in the Lateran’s banqueting hall shortly after the coronation. Robert of Naples, in the meantime, had made increasing demands upon Henry, including Henry making Robert's son the Imperial vicar of Tuscany, and that Henry had to depart Rome within four days of his coronation. Henry, in his turn, declared that the imperial prerogative overrode papal authority, and that the entirety of Italy was subject to the emperor. He then refused to commit, as Pope Clement V had requested, to seek a truce with Robert of Naples, and he didn't rule out attacking the southern kingdom. After Henry concluded a formal treaty signed with Robert's rival to the Sicilian throne, Frederick of Aragon, the chaos in the city of Rome forced Henry to leave, and, following the advice of Tuscan Ghibellines, he travelled north to Arezzo.

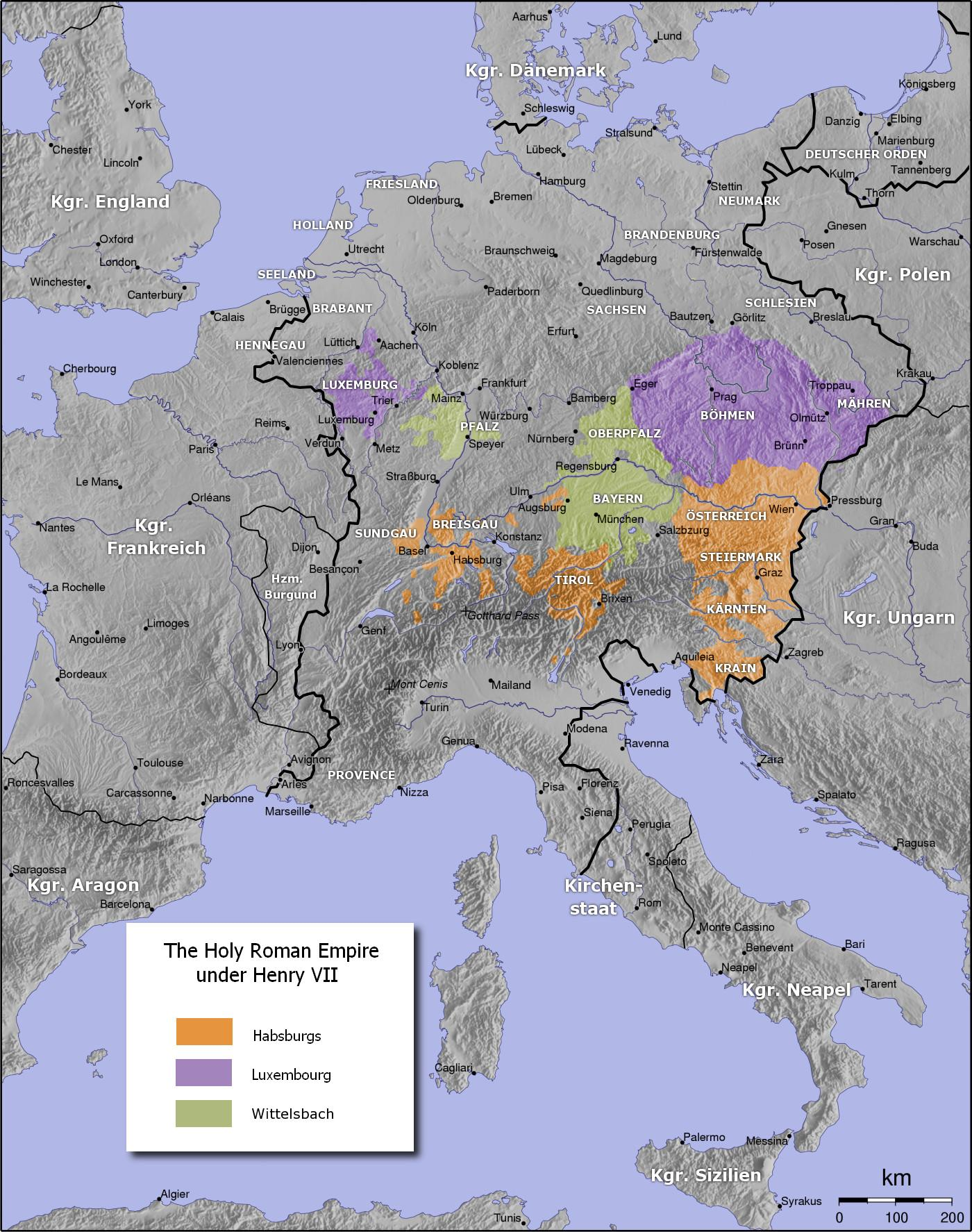
The Empire under Henry VII, House of Luxembourg

At Arezzo, in September 1312, Henry proceeded to pass a sentence against Robert of Naples as a rebel vassal. Meanwhile, at Carpentras near Avignon, Clement was unwilling to fully support Henry, since Robert, of a cadet line of the French, was the representative of French power in Italy, and Clement was far from independent of French policies. Furthermore, he was concerned about being encircled by Henry should he successfully defeat Robert. But before Henry could move against Robert of Naples, he had to deal with the troublesome Florentines, who had been sending money to the Lombard cities that held out against Henry, and who had been strengthening the city's fortifications in anticipation of a siege.

In mid September, Henry approached the city and it was very quickly obvious that the city militia and the Guelph cavalry could not match the emperor in an open battle against his veteran soldiers from the north. The Florentine army was outmaneuvered and lacking in provisions, so it retreated back into Florence during the night. Siena, Bologna, Lucca, and other smaller cities sent men to help man the walls. Thus began the siege of Florence, Henry possessing some 15,000 infantrymen and 2,000 cavalry, up against a combined Florentine strength of 64,000 defenders. Florence was able to keep every gate open except that which faced the emperor, and kept all of her commercial routes open. For six weeks Henry battered the walls of Florence, and was eventually forced to abandon the siege. Nevertheless, by the end of 1312, he had subdued a large part of Tuscany, and had treated his defeated enemies with great leniency. By March 1313, Henry was back in his stronghold of Pisa, and from here he formally charged Robert of Naples with treason after Robert finally agreed to accept the office of the captain of the Guelph League. By now his patience was at an end, and he ordered that throughout Italy, all the inhabitants of all rebellious cities were to be captured, stripped and hanged for treason. While he loitered in Pisa, waiting for reinforcements from Germany, he attacked Lucca, a traditional enemy of Pisa. Henry now prepared for his next move; after taking as much money as he could from Pisa (Henry ultimately cost Pisa some 2 million florins), he began his long-delayed campaign against Robert of Naples on 8 August 1313. His Italian allies were loath to join him, and so his army consisted of some 4,000 knights, while a fleet was prepared to attack Robert's realm directly.

His first target was the Guelph city of Siena, which he began to besiege. However, in a week Henry would succumb to malaria and quickly became seriously ill. His health fading rapidly, he left Siena on 22 August and was sheltering in the little town of Buonconvento near Siena when he died on 24 August 1313. His body was taken to Pisa. The high hopes for an effective Imperial power in Italy died with him.

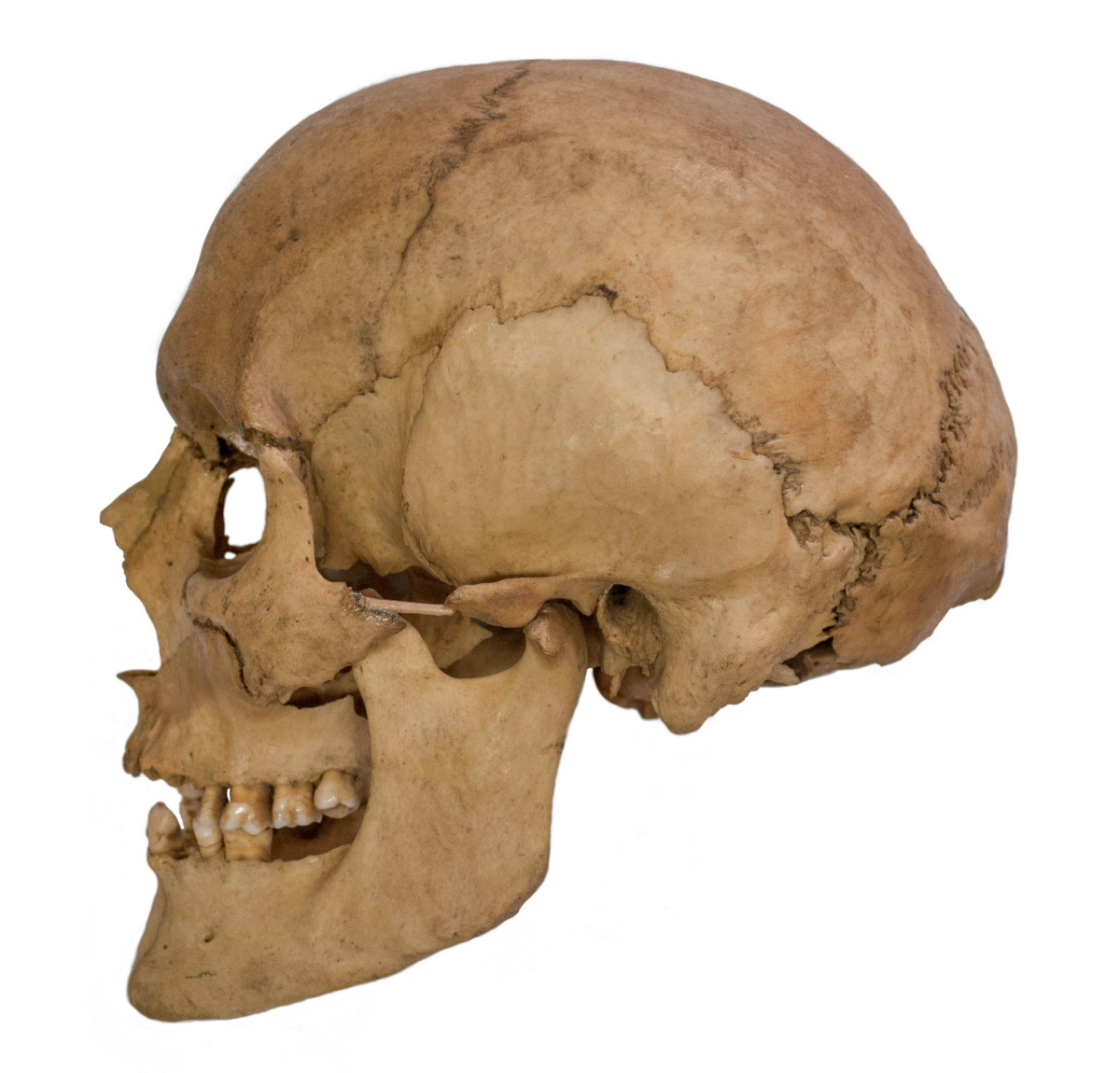
Skull of Henry VII

== Legacy ==
At Henry's death, and for the following decades, the central figure in Italian policy remained his nemesis, Robert of Naples. In the Empire, Henry's son, John the Blind, was elected King of Bohemia in 1310. After the death of Henry VII, two rivals, the Wittelsbach Ludwig of Bavaria and Frederick the Handsome of the House of Habsburg, laid claim to the crown. Their dispute culminated in the Battle of Mühldorf on 28 September 1322, which was lost by Frederick. Ludwig's Italian expedition (1327–29), made in the spirit of righting the wrongs done to Henry, was also abortive. The legacy of Henry was clearest in the successful careers of two among the local despots he made Imperial Vicars in northern cities, Cangrande I della Scala of Verona and Matteo Visconti of Milan.

== Tomb ==
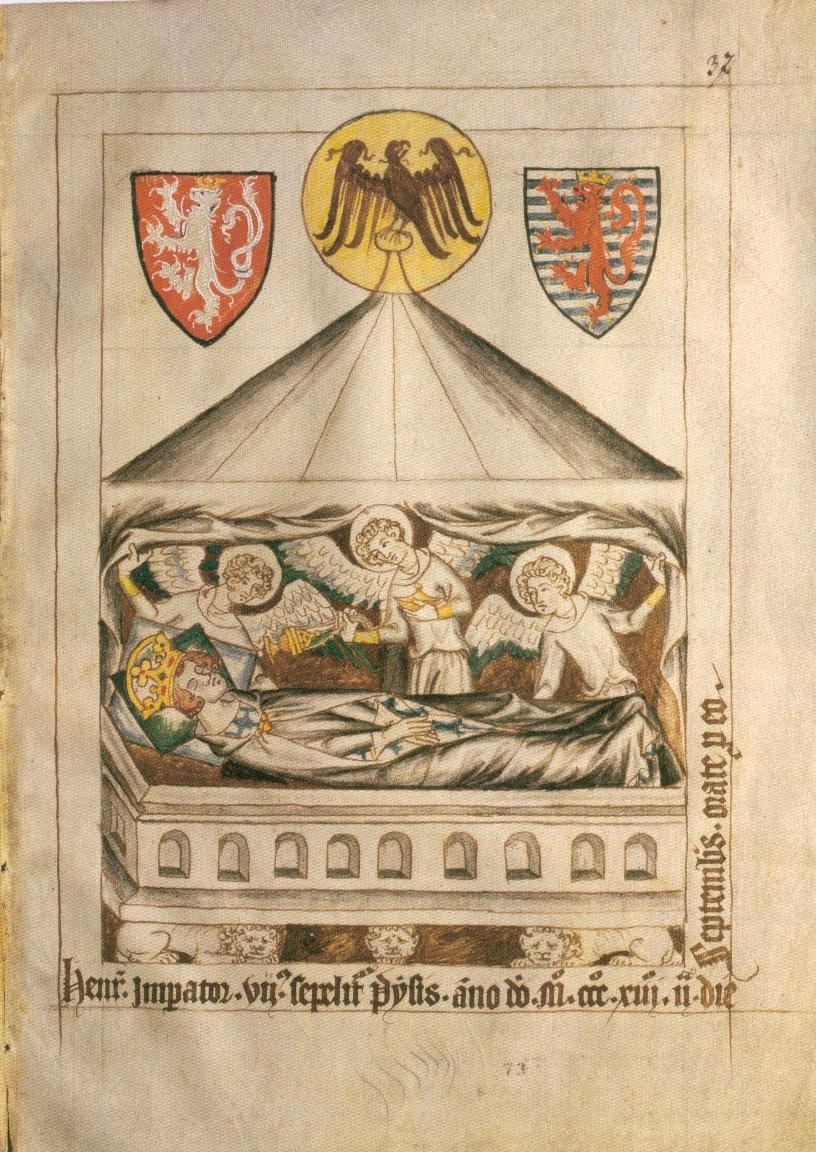
Tomb of Henry VII, Codex Balduini Trevirensis (ca 1340).

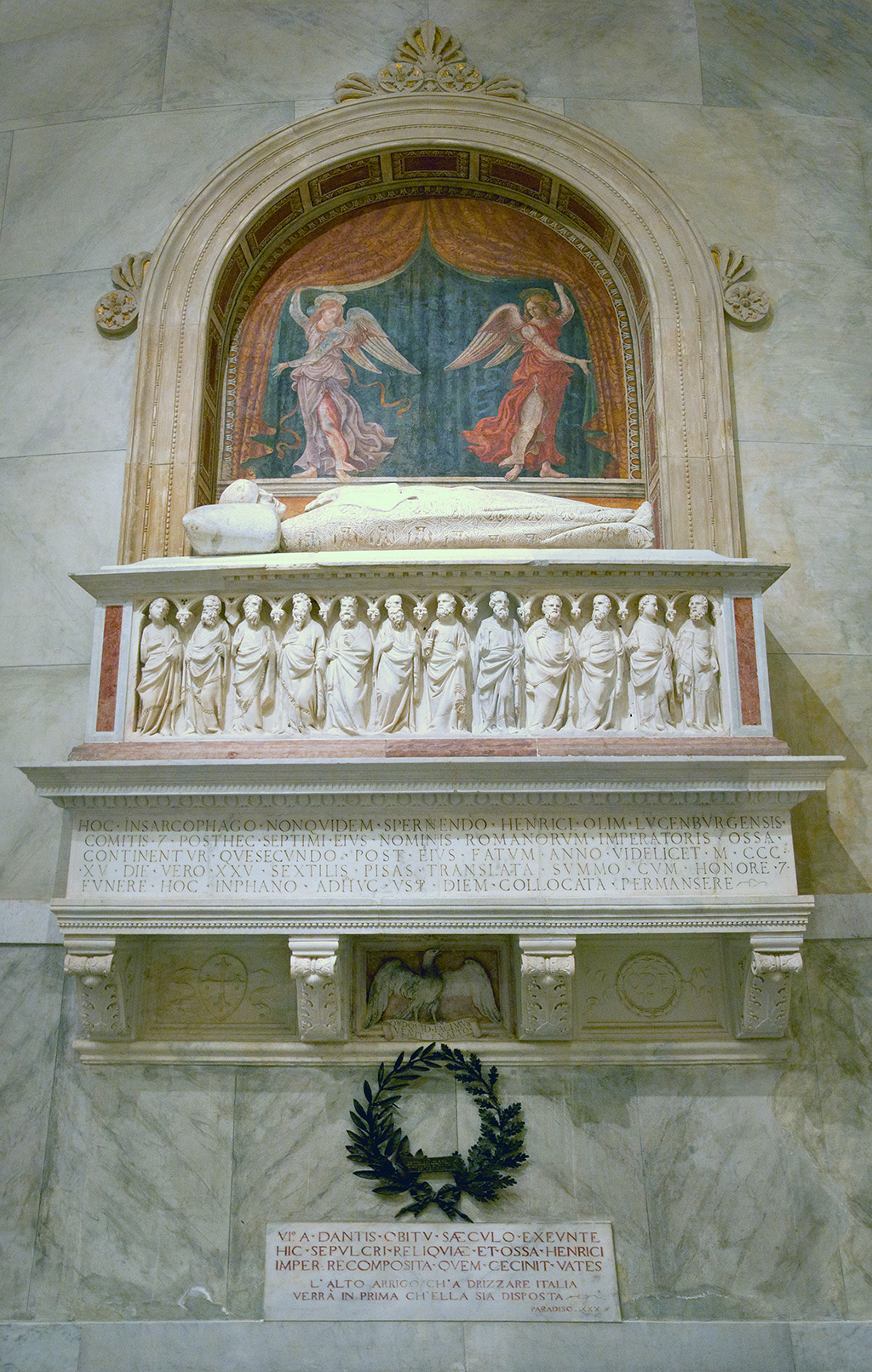
Tomb of Henry VII, August 2012.

Pisa was a Ghibelline city, which means that the city supported the Holy Roman Emperor. When Henry VII died, Pisans built a monumental tomb inside their cathedral. The tomb was centered behind the High Altar in the apse. The choice of place was intended to demonstrate the devotion of the Pisans to the Emperor.

The tomb, constructed in 1315 by Sienese sculptor Tino di Camaino, was built above the grave itself, with the statue of Henry VII lying above it and many other statues and angels. The tomb did not have a long life: for political reasons it was dismantled and the parts were reused in other places in the square. By 1985, the grave of the Emperor had been shifted to the right transept of the cathedral, near the tomb of Saint Ranieri; a couple of statues were put on the top of the façade and a number of statues portraying Henry VII himself and his counsellors were in the Cemetery. Nowadays the statues, the textiles and goldwork gathered around the funeral shroud have been moved to and are featured in the Museum of the Opera del Duomo in Pisa, while the tomb remains in the cathedral.

There is a plaster cast (1890) of the tomb in the Cast Courts of the Victoria and Albert Museum.

Henry VII is the famous alto Arrigo in Dante's Paradiso, in which the poet is shown the seat of honor that awaits Henry in Heaven. Henry in Paradiso xxx.137f is "He who came to reform Italy before she was ready for it". Dante also alludes to him numerous times in Purgatorio as the savior who will bring imperial rule back to Italy, and end the inappropriate temporal control of the Church. In 1921, on the occasion of the 600th anniversary of Dante's death, Henry VII's tomb was opened and examined.

Henry VII's tomb was opened and studied again in 2013, 700 years after his death. The remains had been wrapped in a large rectangular colorful silk shroud, described in the 1921 study as "a fine shroud woven in bands", which was retrieved from the coffin for analysis and subsequently moved to be displayed at the Museum of the Opera del Duomo. The skeleton was recomposed and its analysis led to the estimation that Henry VII's height was 1.78 metres. The bones were also examined by X-ray diffraction, infrared spectroscopy, and scanning electron microscopy to study medieval post-mortem practices.

== Family and children ==
Henry was married in Tervuren 9 July 1292 to Margaret of Brabant, daughter of John I, Duke of Brabant, and had three children:

- John I, King of Bohemia (10 August 1296 – 26 August 1346)
- Marie (1304 – 26 March 1324, Issoudun), married in Paris 21 September 1322 to King Charles IV of France.
- Beatrix (1305 – 11 November 1319), married 1318 to King Charles I of Hungary. Beatrix died in child birth.

== See also ==
- Towers and palaces of the Roero

== Bibliography ==
- Kurt-Ulrich Jäschke, Peter Thorau, ed. (2006). "Heinrich VII. 1288/1308–1313, part one 1288/1308 – August 1309". Die Regesten des Kaiserreichs unter Rudolf, Adolf, Albrecht, Heinrich VII. 1273–1313. Vienna: Böhlau. ISBN 3-412-01906-2.
- Kurt-Ulrich Jäschke, Peter Thorau, ed. (2014). "Die Regesten des Kaiserreichs unter Heinrich VII. 1288/1308–1313, part two 1. September 1309–23. Oktober 1310". Die Regesten des Kaiserreichs unter Rudolf, Adolf, Albrecht, Heinrich VII. 1273–1313. Vienna: Böhlau. ISBN 978-3-412-22181-2.
- Menzel, Michael (2012). Die Zeit der Entwürfe (1273–1347). Stuttgart: Klett-Cotta.
- Michel Pauly, ed. (2010). Gouvernance européenne au bas moyen âge. Henri VII de Luxembourg et l’Europe des grandes dynasties Actes des 15es Journées Lotharingiennes, 14 – 17 octobre 2008 (in French). Linden, Luxemburg: Université du Luxembourg. ISBN 978-2-919979-22-6.
- Jones, Michael (2000). c. 1300-c. 1415. The New Cambridge Medieval History. Vol. VI. Cambridge: Cambridge University Press. ISBN 1139055747.
- Kleinhenz, Christopher (2004). Medieval Italy: an encyclopedia. Vol. 1. London: Routledge. ISBN 9781351664448.
- Bowsky, William M. (1960). Henry VII in Italy. Lincoln: University of Nebraska. OCLC 163786531.
- Franke, Maria Elisabeth (1992). Kaiser Heinrich VII. im Spiegel der Historiographie : eine faktenkritische und quellenkundliche Untersuchung ausgewählter Geschichtsschreiber (in German). Köln: Böhlau. ISBN 3412103926.
- Gades, John A. (1951). Luxemburg in the Middle Ages. Leiden: Brill. OCLC 264628222.

Out of date:

- Bryce, James (1913). The Holy Roman Empire. New York: Schocken Books. OCLC 968255.
- Sismondi, J. C. L. (1906). History of the Italian Republics in the Middle Ages. London: Routledge. OCLC 1907981.
- Comyn, Robert (1851). History of the Western Empire, from its Restoration by Charlemagne to the Accession of Charles. Vol. I. London: Allen. OCLC 633936454.

Henry VII, Holy Roman Emperor House of Luxembourg Born: c. 1273 Died: 1313
Regnal titles
Preceded by Henry VI	Count of Luxembourg; 1288–1313	Succeeded by John
Preceded by Gérard I	Count of Durbuy c. 1298–1313	Succeeded by John
Preceded by Albert I	King of the Romans; 1308–1313	Succeeded by Louis IV
Preceded by Conrad IV	King of Italy; 1311–1313	Succeeded by Louis IV
Preceded by Frederick II	Holy Roman Emperor; 1312–1313	Succeeded by Louis IV
