= William de Valence, 1st Earl of Pembroke =

Anglo-Norman noble, allied with Henry III

William de Valence
- Earl of Pembroke
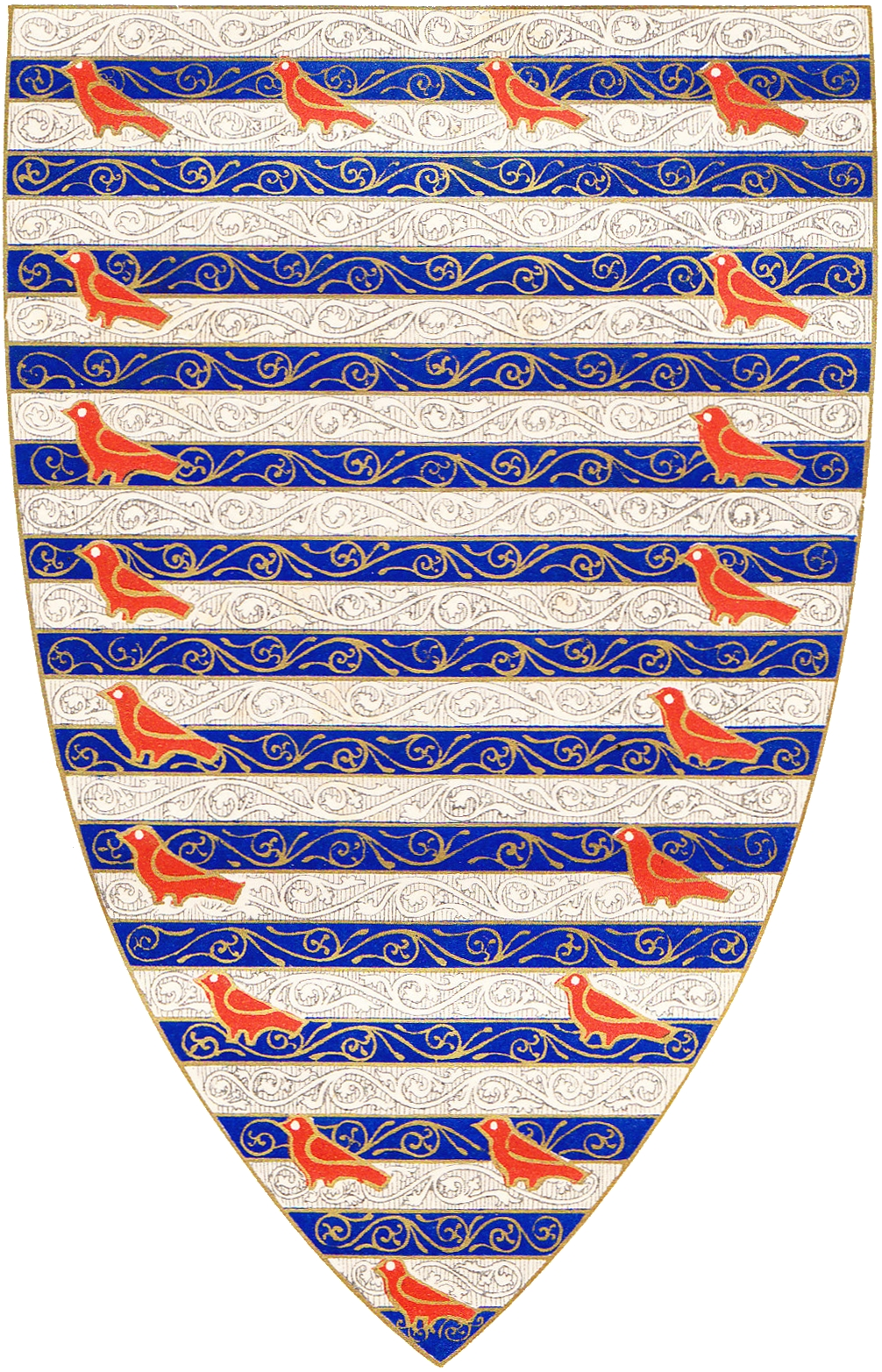
- Heraldic shield of de Valence from his tomb in Westminster Abbey. Champlevee enamel with Diapering: Barry of argent and azure, an orle of martlets gules
- Successor: Aymer de Valence
- Native name: Guillaume de Lusignan
- Born: c. 1227
- Died: 13 June 1296
- Buried: Westminster Abbey
- Wife: Joan de Munchensi
- Issue: 6
- Father: Hugh X of Lusignan
- Mother: Isabella of Angoulême

William de Valence (died 13 June 1296), born Guillaume de Lusignan, was a French nobleman and knight who became important in English politics due to his relationship to King Henry III of England. He was heavily involved in the Second Barons' War, fighting for the King and Prince Edward against the rebels led by Simon de Montfort. He took the name de Valence ("of Valence") after his birthplace, the Cistercian abbey of Valence, near Lusignan in Poitou.

== Biography ==
William de Valence was the fourth son of Isabella of Angoulême, widow of King John, and her second husband, Hugh X of Lusignan, Count of La Marche, and was thus a half-brother to Henry III, and uncle to Edward I. William was born in the Cistercian abbey in Valence, Couhé-Vérac, Vienne, Poitou-Charentes, near Lusignan, sometime in the late 1220s (his elder sister Alice was born in 1224).

=== Move to England ===
Arms of de Valence before he became Earl of Pembroke, showing for difference: a label gules of five points each charged with three lions rampant argent

The French conquest of Poitou in 1246 created great difficulties for William's family, and so he and his brothers, Guy de Lusignan and Aymer, accepted Henry III's invitation to come to England in 1247. The king found important positions for all of them; William was soon married to a great heiress, Joan de Munchensi or Munchensy (c. 1230 – after 20 September 1307), the only surviving child of Warin de Munchensy, lord of Swanscombe, and his first wife Joan Marshal, who was one of the five daughters of William Marshal, a previous Earl, and Isabel de Clare, 4th Countess of Pembroke suo jure. As an eventual co-heiress of the Marshal estates, Joan de Munchensi's portion included the castle and lordship of Pembroke and the lordship erected earldom of Wexford in Ireland. The custody of Joan's property was entrusted to her husband, who apparently assumed the lordships of Pembroke and Wexford between 1250 and 1260. In 1304, after William's death, Joan is found vigorously asserting her rights in her lordship of Wexford, appealing directly to the king against a court order dispossessing her of her lands there.

=== Second Barons' War ===
This favouritism to royal relatives was unpopular with many of the English nobility, a discontent which would culminate in the Second Barons' War. It did not take long for William to make enemies in England. From his new lands in South Wales, he tried to regain the palatine rights which had been attached to the Earldom of Pembroke, but his energies were not confined to this. The king heaped lands and honours upon him, and he was soon thoroughly hated as one of the most prominent of the rapacious foreigners. Moreover, some trouble in Wales led to a quarrel between him and Simon de Montfort, who was to become the figurehead for the rebels. He refused to comply with the provisions imposed on the king at Oxford in 1258, and took refuge in Wolvesey Castle at Winchester, where he was besieged and compelled to surrender and leave the country.

In 1259 William and de Montfort were formally reconciled in Paris, and in 1261 Valence was again in England and once more enjoying the royal favour. He fought for Henry at the disastrous Battle of Lewes, and after the defeat again fled to France, while de Montfort ruled England. However, by 1265 he was back, landing in Pembrokeshire, and taking part in the siege of Gloucester and the final royalist victory at Evesham. After the battle he was restored to his estates and accompanied Prince Edward, afterwards Edward I, on Crusade to Palestine.

=== Welsh wars and death ===
From his base in Pembrokeshire, he was a mainstay of the English campaigns against Llywelyn ap Gruffudd and later Dafydd ap Gruffudd; in the war of 1282–3 that led to the conquest of Wales he negotiated the surrender of one of Dafydd's last remaining castles, Castell-y-Bere, with its custodian, Cynfrig ap Madog. He also went several times to France on public business and he was one of Edward's representatives in the famous suit over the succession to the crown of Scotland in 1291 and 1292.

William de Valence died at Bayonne on the 13 June 1296, and his body was buried in splendour at Westminster Abbey.

== Descendants ==
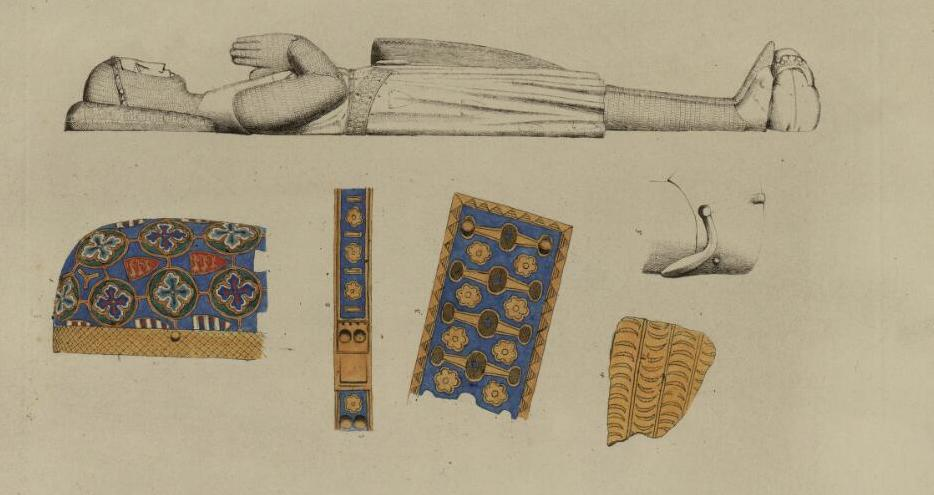
A study of the tomb of de Valence published by Charles Alfred Stothard

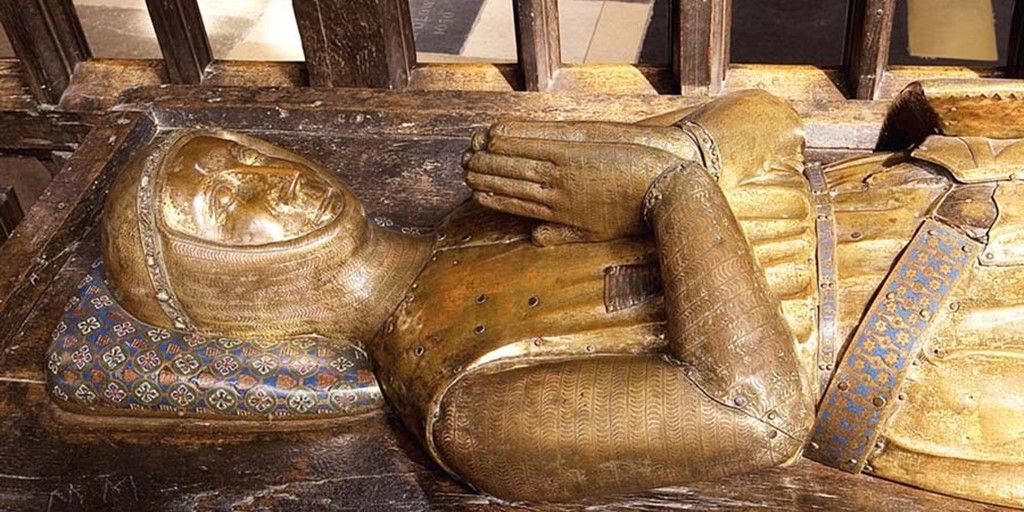
Detail of the funeral effigy

William and Joan de Munchensi (described above) had the following children:

- Isabel de Valence (died 5 October 1305), married before 1280 John Hastings, 1st Baron Hastings (6 May 1262 – 10 February 1313). They had:
  - William Hastings (1282–1311)
  - John Hastings, 2nd Baron Hastings (29 September 1286 – 20 January 1325), married to Juliane de Leybourne (died 1367). Their son Lawrence later became 1st Earl of Pembroke of the Hastings family.
  - Sir Hugh Hastings of Sutton (died 1347)
  - Elizabeth Hastings (1294 – 6 March 1353), married Roger Grey, 1st Baron Grey de Ruthyn.
- Joan de Valence, married to John Comyn (the "Red Comyn"), Lord of Badenoch (murdered 10 February 1306), and had
  - John Comyn (killed 1314 at Bannockburn), married to Margaret Wake, 3rd Baroness Wake of Liddell
  - Joan Comyn (c. 1296–1326), married to David II Strathbogie, Earl of Atholl
  - Elizabeth Comyn (1 November 1299 – 20 November 1372), married to Richard Talbot, Lord Talbot
- John de Valence (died January 1277)
- William de Valence (died 16 June 1282, in the Battle of Llandeilo Fawr in Wales), created Seigneur de Montignac and Bellac
- Aymer de Valence, 2nd Earl of Pembroke and Wexford in 1296 (c. 1270 – 23 June 1324), married first to Beatrice de Clermont and second to Marie de Châtillon-sur-Marne (also known as Marie de St Pol). He left no legitimate issue.
- Margaret de Valence, died young. Buried at Westminster Abbey.
- Agnes de Valence (born c. 1250, date of death unknown), married (1) Maurice FitzGerald, Baron of Offaly, (2) Hugh de Balliol, son of John de Balliol, and brother of John Balliol, King of Scotland, and (3) John of Avesnes, Lord of Beaumont, son of Baldwin of Avesnes. Agnes had children from her first and third marriages:
  - Gerald FitzMaurice, Baron of Offaly
  - John of Avesnes
  - Baldwin of Avesnes, Lord of Beaumont
  - Felicite of Avesnes
  - Jeanne of Avesnes, Abbess of Flines

== Sources ==
- Ancestral Roots of Certain American Colonists Who Came to America Before 1700 by Frederick Lewis Weis, Lines: 80-29, 93A-29, 95-30, 154-29.

Peerage of England
New creation	Earl of Pembroke; 1247–1296	Succeeded by Aymer de Valence
