= Bouchard IV of Avesnes =

Hainaut nobleman and soldier

- Coat of arms of Avesnes
- Born: 1182
- Died: 1244 (aged 61–62)
- Noble family: House of Avesnes
- Spouse: Margaret II of Flanders (m. 1212; ann. 1215)
- Issue: John of Avesnes; Baldwin of Avesnes
- Father: James of Avesnes
- Mother: Adela of Guise

Burchard IV or Bouchard IV (1182–1244) was the lord of Avesnes and Étrœungt. He was the son of James of Avesnes and Adela of Guise and brother of Walter, Count of Blois.

Bouchard began his career as a cantor and subdeacon in the church of Laon. In 1212, he was named bailiff of Hainaut. In this capacity, he served as tutor and guardian of the young Margaret, daughter of Baldwin VI of Hainault and sister of Joanna, Countess of Flanders and Hainault. He later married her in 1212, though she was only ten years old and the marriage could not be consummated. Neither Joanna nor her husband, Count Ferdinand, gave their consent and tried to halt the marriage but failed.

Bouchard invaded the territory of his brother Walter, who had received most of their patrimony. He then invaded Flanders and forced Joanna and Ferdinand to recognise his marriage to Margaret. He fought at the Battle of Bouvines in 1214, under the (losing) Flemish banner. Philip Augustus, the king of France and victor of Bouvines, then counselled the pope, Innocent III, to declare Bouchard's marriage illegal. When Innocent eventually excommunicated Bouchard on 19 January 1216, he and Margaret took refuge in Luxembourg. The excommunication was reaffirmed by Honorius 1218, who added in anyone assisting Bouchard. In 1219, Bouchard was captured in battle and was imprisoned in Ghent for two years. To obtain his release, Margaret accepted the dissolution of her marriage and Bouchard left for Italy to fight for the Holy See. Upon his return, he was decapitated at Rupelmonde on the orders of Joanna.

== Marriage and issue ==
Bouchard and Margaret had:

- Baldwin (1217–1219), took refuge with his parents in Luxembourg
- John I (1218–1257), later Count of Hainault
- Baldwin (1219–1295), Lord of Beaumont

== Sources ==
- Bradbury, Jim (1998). Philip Augustus: King of France 1180-1223. Taylor & Francis. ISBN 9781317899020.
- Lane-Poole, Austin (1929). "The Interregnum in Germany". In Tanner, J.R.; Previte-Orton, C.W.; Brooke, Z.N. (eds.). The Cambridge Medieval History. Cambridge at the University Press. pp. 110–130.
- Platelle, Henri (2004). Présence de l'au-delà: une vision médiévale du monde. Presses Universitaires du Septentrion. ISBN 9782859398521.
- Shotten-Hallel, Vardit R. (2021). "'Atlit Castle surveys: Charters versus the archaeological evidence". In Fishhof, Gil; Bronstein, Judith; Shotten-Hallel, Vardit R. (eds.). Settlement and Crusade in the Thirteenth Century: Multidisciplinary studies of the Latin East. Routledge. pp. 91–112. ISBN 978-0-367-19674-5.94
