= 1345 =

1345 in various calendars
- Gregorian calendar: 1345; MCCCXLV
- Ab urbe condita: 2098
- Armenian calendar: 794; ԹՎ ՉՂԴ
- Assyrian calendar: 6095
- Balinese saka calendar: 1266–1267
- Bengali calendar: 751–752
- Berber calendar: 2295
- English Regnal year: 18 Edw. 3 – 19 Edw. 3
- Buddhist calendar: 1889
- Burmese calendar: 707
- Byzantine calendar: 6853–6854
- Chinese calendar: 甲申年 (Wood Monkey); 4042 or 3835 — to — 乙酉年 (Wood Rooster); 4043 or 3836
- Coptic calendar: 1061–1062
- Discordian calendar: 2511
- Ethiopian calendar: 1337–1338
- Hebrew calendar: 5105–5106
- Hindu calendars
- Vikram Samvat: 1401–1402
- Shaka Samvat: 1266–1267
- Kali Yuga: 4445–4446
- Holocene calendar: 11345
- Igbo calendar: 345–346
- Iranian calendar: 723–724
- Islamic calendar: 745–746
- Japanese calendar: Kōei 4 / Jōwa 1 (貞和元年)
- Javanese calendar: 1257–1258
- Julian calendar: 1345; MCCCXLV
- Korean calendar: 3678
- Minguo calendar: 567 before ROC 民前567年
- Nanakshahi calendar: −123
- Thai solar calendar: 1887–1888
- Tibetan calendar: ཤིང་ཕོ་སྤྲེ་ལོ་ (male Wood-Monkey); 1471 or 1090 or 318 — to — ཤིང་མོ་བྱ་ལོ་ (female Wood-Bird); 1472 or 1091 or 319

Year 1345 (MCCCXLV) was a common year starting on Saturday of the Julian calendar. It was a year in the 14th century, in the midst of a period in human history often referred to as the Late Middle Ages.

During this year on the Asian continent, several divisions of the old Mongol Empire were in a state of gradual decline. The Ilkhanate had already fragmented into several kingdoms struggling to place their puppet emperors over the shell of an old state. The Chagatai Khanate was in the midst of a civil war and one year from falling to rebellion. The Golden Horde to the north was besieging Genoese colonies along the coast of the Black Sea, and the Yuan dynasty in China was seeing the first seeds of a resistance which would lead to its downfall. Southeast Asia remained free from Mongol power, with several small kingdoms struggling for survival. The Siamese dynasty in that area vanquished the Sukhothai in this year. In the Indonesian Archipelago, the Majapahit Empire was in the midst of a golden age under the leadership of Gajah Mada, who remains a famous figure in Indonesia.

England and France were engaged in the early stages of the Hundred Years' War, with the Battle of Auberoche fought in Northern France in October of this year. In the Iberian Peninsula, Alfonso XI of Castile again besieged the Muslim city of Granada as part of the Reconquista, but without success. The Holy Roman Empire under Louis IV took control of Holland and the surrounding area, granting these lands to his wife Margaret II, Countess of Hainaut in a move which angered many of his princes. Holland was also in the midst of the Friso-Hollandic Wars, engaging with the Frisians on 26 September in the Battle of Warns. Italy, which at the time was divided into several principalities, saw several power struggles including the Battle of Gamenario in the north, and the assassination of Andrew, Duke of Calabria in the Kingdom of Naples. In Northern Europe, Swedes continued early stages of their emigration to Estonia, which would continue in the coming decades. Estonian rulers also managed to crush the St. George's Night Uprising in 1345 after a two-year struggle. The Grand Duchy of Lithuania changed hands from Jaunutis to his brother Algirdas in a relatively bloodless shift of power, and Lithuania continued its skirmishes with its northern, Estonian neighbor.

The main forces in the Balkans in 1345 were Serbia, Bulgaria, and the Byzantine Empire. Stefan Uroš IV Dušan of Serbia proclaimed himself Tsar of the new Serbian Empire and continued his efforts at expansion, quickly conquering Albania and other surrounding areas within the year. The Byzantines, though powerful, were in a state of decline, with an ongoing civil war between emperors John V Palaiologos and John VI Kantakouzenos, although in 1345, the tide began to turn toward the latter. At the same time, the Zealot commune in Thessalonica entered a more radical phase.

Turks clashed with Byzantines, Serbs, and Cypriots at sea and in the islands of Chios and Imbros. The Byzantine Empire's precarious situation at this time is evidenced by the fact that they did not have enough soldiers to protect their own borders, but hired mercenaries from the Serbs and the Ottoman Turks.

== Events ==
- January 17 – The Turks attack Smyrna.
- March 15 – The Miracle of the Host occurs (as commemorated in Amsterdam).
- March 4 – Guy de Chauliac observes the planets Saturn, Jupiter, and Mars conjoined in the sky, under the sign of Aquarius, and a solar eclipse on the same day. This sign is interpreted as foreboding by many, and Chauliac will later blame it for the Black Plague.
- April – Edward III of England offers "defiance" of Philip VI of France.
- April 22 – Battle of Gamenario: The Lombards defeat the Angevins in the northwest region of present-day Italy, just southeast of Turin.
- May – The Turks, led by Umur Beg, sail from Asia Minor to the Balkan Peninsula, and raid Bulgarian territory.
- "Summer" (undated) – Louis IV's son, Louis VI the Roman, marries Cunigunde, a Lithuanian princess.
- July 7 – Battle of Peritheorion: the forces of Momchil, autonomous ruler of the Rhodope, are defeated by the Turkish allies of John VI Kantakouzenos.
- August – Gascon campaign of 1345 - Battle of Bergerac, Gascony: English troops are victorious over the French.
- September – Holland, Hainaut and Zeeland are inherited by Louis IV, Holy Roman Emperor, and remain part of the imperial crown domain until 1347.
- September 18 – Andrew, Duke of Calabria, is assassinated in Naples (d. in Aversa).
- September 26 – Battle of Warns: The Frisians defeat the forces of Holland under William II, Count of Hainaut, in the midst of the Friso-Hollandic Wars.
- October 21 – Battle of Auberoche in Gascony: The English defeat the French.
- November 8 – The English take La Réole in Gascony.
- December – The English take Aiguillon in Gascony.

== Asia ==
Asia in 1345

=== Western Asia ===
The country of Georgia had been struggling for independence from the Ilkhanate since the first anti-Mongol uprising started in 1259 under the leadership of King David Narin who in fact waged his war for almost thirty years. Finally, it was King George the Brilliant (1314–1346) who managed to play on the decline of the Ilkhanate, stopped paying tribute to the Mongols, restored the pre-1220 state borders of Georgia, and returned the Empire of Trebizond into Georgia's sphere of influence. Thus, in 1345, Georgia was in the midst of golden age of independence, though its leader would die one year later.

Trebizond had reached its greatest wealth and influence during the long reign of Alexios II (1297–1330). It was now in a period of repeated imperial depositions and assassinations that lasted from the end of Alexios II's reign until the first years of Alexios III's, finally ending in 1355. The empire never fully recovered its internal cohesion, commercial supremacy or territory. Its ruler in 1345, Michael Megas Komnenos, was crowned Emperor of Trebizond in 1344 after his son, John III, was deposed. He was forced to sign a document which gave the Grand Duke and his ministers almost all power in the Empire, promising to seek their counsel in all official actions. This constitutional experiment was short-lived, however, because of opposition from the people of Trebizond, who rose up in revolt against the oligarchy. Michael swiftly took advantage of his opportunity to regain power and arrested and imprisoned the Grand Duke in 1345. He also sent his son John to Constantinople and then Adrianople, where he was to be kept prisoner to prevent him from becoming a focus of dissent.

=== Mongol khanates ===
The Mongol Empire had become fractured since the late 13th century. After the death of Kublai Khan in 1294, it had already been divided into four khanates: The Yuan dynasty, the Ilkhanate, the Golden Horde, and the Chagatai Khanate.

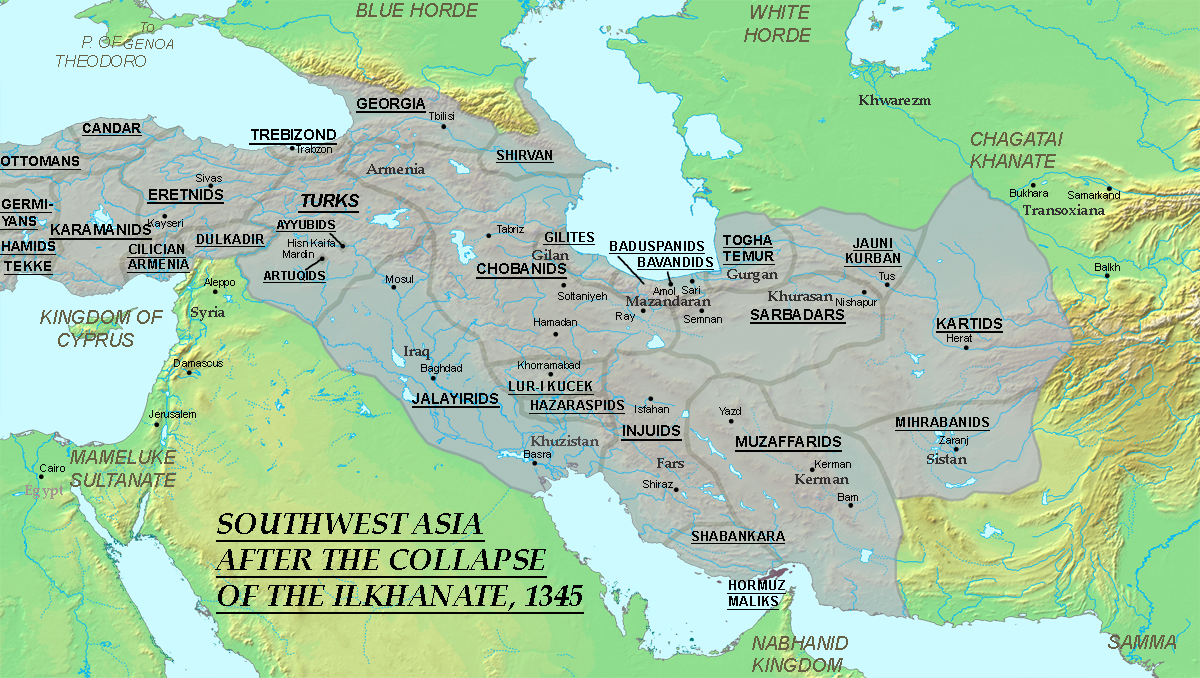
Map showing the political situation in southwest Asia in 1345, ten years after the death of Abu Sa'id. The Jalayirids, Chobanids, Muzaffarids, Injuids, Sarbadars and Kartids took the Ilkhanate's place as the major powers in Iran.

==== Ilkhanate ====
The Ilkhanate had been declining rapidly since 1335, when Abu Sa'id died without an heir. Since then, various factions, including the Chobanids and the Jalayirids, had been competing for the Ilkhan throne. Hassan Kuchak, a Chobanid prince, was murdered late in 1343. Surgan, son of Sati Beg, the sister of Abu Sa'id, found himself competing for control of the Chobanid lands with the late ruler's brother Malek Ashraf and his uncle Yagi Basti. When he was defeated by Malek Asraf, he fled to his mother and stepfather. The three of them then formed an alliance, but when Hasan Buzurg (Jalayirid) decided to withdraw the support he promised, the plan fell apart, and they fled to Diyarbakır. Surgan was defeated again in 1345 by Malek Asraf and they fled to Anatolia. Coinage dating from that year appears in Hesn Kayfa in Sati Beg's name; this is the last trace of her. Surgan moved from Anatolia to Baghdad, where he was eventually executed by Hasan Buzurg; Sati Beg may have suffered the same fate, but this is unknown.

==== Golden Horde ====
In 1345, the Golden Horde made a second attempt to lay siege on the Genoese city of Kaffa. (An earlier attempt had failed because Kaffa was able to get provisions across the Black Sea.) The 1345 siege would fail in the following year as the Mongols were struck with the Black Plague and forced to retreat. This siege is therefore noted as one of the key events that brought the Black Plague to Europe.

The Kingdom of Hungary saw the threat of the growing power of the Golden Horde and as such, in 1345 it began a campaign against the Tatars and the Horde, in the area what would become a few years later Moldavia. Andrew Lackfi, the Voivode of Transylvania and his Székely warriors were victorious in their campaign, decapitating the local Tatar leader, the brother-in-law of the Khan, Atlamïş and making the Tatars flee toward the coastal area.

==== Chagatai Khanate ====
Qazaghan (d. 1358) was the leader of the Qara'unas tribe (1345 at the latest – 1358) and the powerful de facto ruler of the Chagatai ulus (1346–1358). In 1345 he revolted against Qazan Khan, but was unsuccessful. The following year he would try again and succeed in killing the khan. With this the effective power of the Chagatai khans would come to an end; the khanate eventually devolved into a loose confederation of tribes that respected the authority of Qazaghan, although he primarily commanded the loyalty of the tribes of the southern portion of the ulus. He did not claim the khanship, but instead contented himself with his title of amir and conferred the title of khan on puppets of his own choosing: first Danishmendji (1346–1348) and then Bayan Qulï (1348–1358).

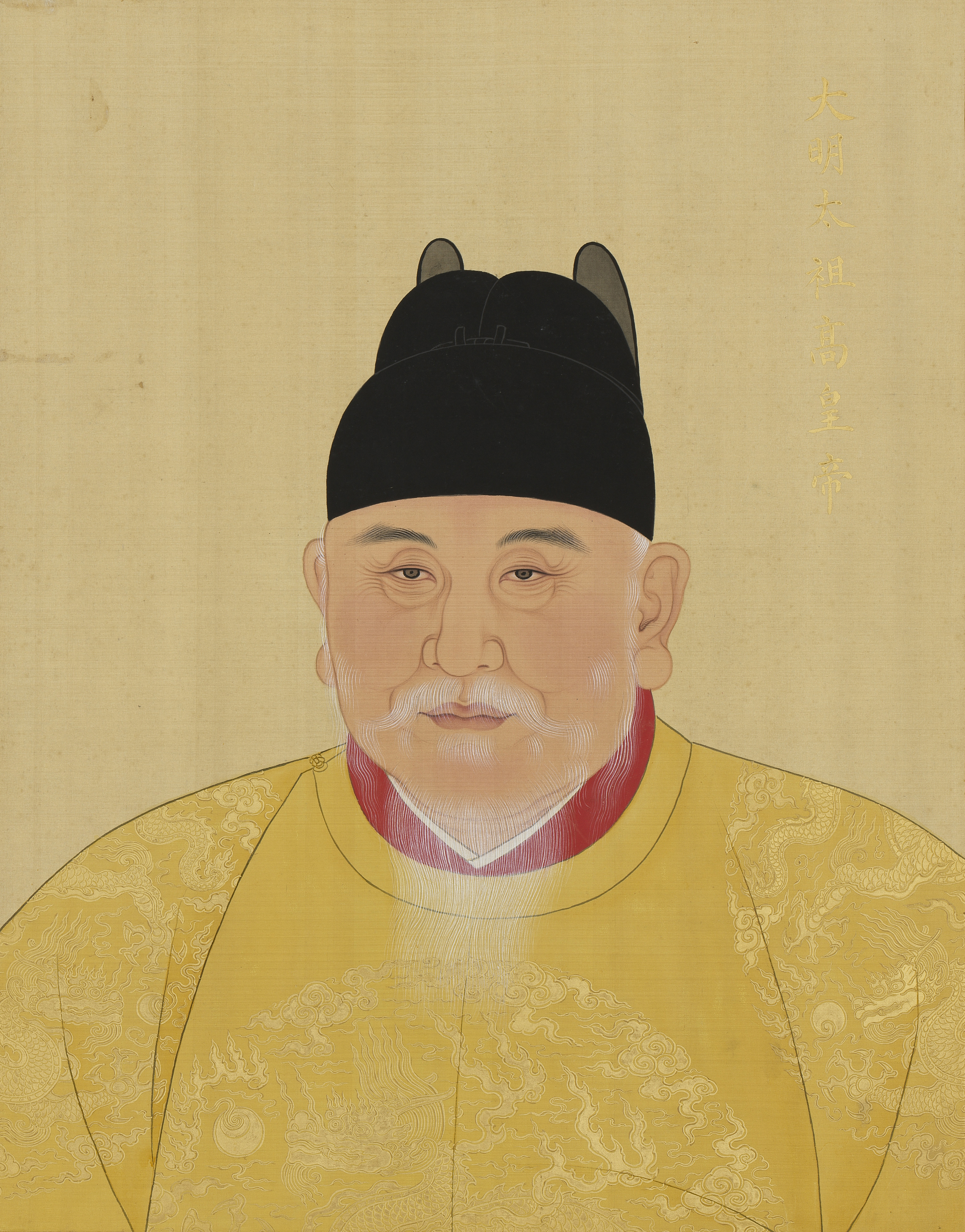
Zhu Yuanzhang joined forces rebellious to the Yuan dynasty in 1345. This later led to his becoming the first emperor of the Ming dynasty.

==== Yuan dynasty ====
By 1345, the Yuan dynasty in China was steadily declining. Chinese peasants, upset with the lack of effective policies by the government when they were facing droughts, floods, and famines, were becoming rebellious. The Yellow River flooded in Jinan in 1345. The river had flooded previously in 1335 and in 1344. There was also conflict between the rulers of the dynasty. Zhu Yuanzhang was about 16 years old in 1345. His parents and brothers had died of plague or famine (or both) in 1344, and he joined a Buddhist monastery. In 1345 he left the monastery and joined a band of rebels. He would lead a series of rebellions until he overthrew the Yuan dynasty and became the first emperor of the Ming dynasty in 1368.

=== Japan and India ===
Muhammad bin Tughluq was reigning as Sultan of Delhi in 1345 when there was a revolt of Muslim military commanders in the Daulatabad area. In Bengal, on the eastern border of the Sultanate, a general named llyas captured East Bengal, leading to its reunification. He established his capital at Gaur. In southern India, Harihara I had founded the Vijayanagara Empire in 1336. After the death of Hoysala Veera Ballala III during a battle against the Sultan of Madurai in 1343, the Hoysala Empire had merged with the growing Vijayanagara Empire. In these first two decades after the founding of the empire, Harihara I gained control over most of the area south of the Tungabhadra river and earned the title of Purvapaschima Samudradhishavara ("master of the eastern and western oceans"). The Jaffna Kingdom, which encompassed the southern tip of India and parts of Sri Lanka; there was continual conflict with Vijayanagara and the smaller Kotte Kingdom of southern Sri Lanka.

From 1336 to 1392, two courts claimed the throne of Japan. This was known as the Nanboku-chō, or the Northern and Southern Courts period. In the Northern Court, Emperor Go-Murakami claimed the throne. In the Southern Court, Emperor Kōmyō claimed the throne.

=== Southeast Asia ===
In Southeast Asia, Sukhothai changed hands to a new Siamese dynasty in 1345. A Buddhist work, the Traibhumikatha, was composed by the King of Siam in the same year. The Sukhothai Emperor also wrote a similar Buddhist work, the Tri Phum Phra Ruang. Both works describe Southeast Asian cosmological ideas which still exist today. Life is said in these books to be divided into 31 levels of existence separated between three worlds. Angkor was in a period of decline, forced to devote much of its resources to skirmishes with the Sukhothai and Siamese, which left Champa free to attack Đại Việt and opened the way for Lopburi to spring up, all of which happened right around this year. A Buddhist colony also existed to the west in the Mon Empire, which struggled to maintain its existence in the face of the Islamic Delhi Sultanate to the west and the Mongol Chinese to the north.

The Majapahit Empire, which occupied much of the Indonesian Archipelago, was ruled by empress Tribhuwana Wijayatunggadewi. During Tribhuwana's rule, the Majapahit kingdom had grown much larger and became famous in the area. Gajah Mada reigned at the time along with the empress as mahapatih (prime minister) of Majapahit. It was during their rule in 1345 that the famous Muslim traveller Ibn Battuta visited Samudra in the Indonesian Archipelago. According to Battuta's report on his visit to Samudra, the ruler of the local area was a Muslim, and the people worshiped as Muslims in mosques and recited the Koran. Many Islamic traders and travelers had already scattered themselves along the major cities and coasts surrounding the Indian Ocean by this time.

== Western Europe ==
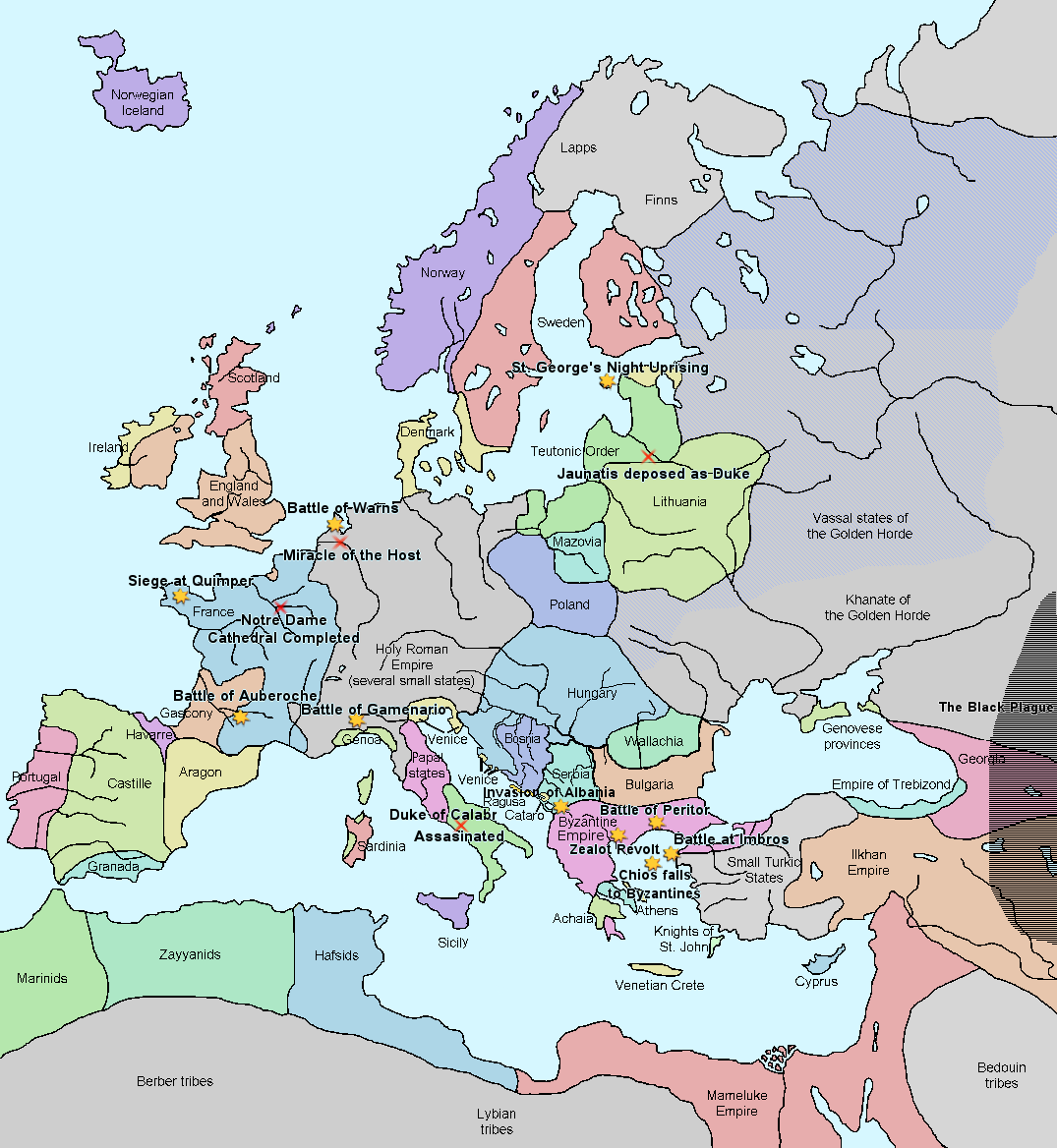
Europe in 1345

=== Hundred Years' War ===
By 1345, the Hundred Years' War between France and England had been going on for only about eight years. The English claimed the right to the French throne, and the French refused to be ruled by foreigners. In August the English Earl of Derby commenced the Gascon campaign of 1345, taking a large French army at Bergerac, Dordogne by surprise and decisively defeating it. Later in the campaign, on 21 October the French were besieging the castle at Auberoche, when Derby's army caught them off guard during their evening meal and won one of the most decisive battles of the war. This set the stage for English dominance in the area for several years. Previous to this, the French had been having success, and the English had even offered a treaty, but with this battle along with Derby's overrunning of the Agenais (lost twenty years before in the War of Saint-Sardos) and Angoulême, as well as the forces in Brittany under Sir Thomas Dagworth also making gains, the tide turned somewhat in this year.

A new machine was introduced to this war in 1345—cannon. "Ribaldis", as they were then called, are first mentioned in the English Privy Wardrobe accounts during preparations for the Battle of Crécy between 1345 and 1346. These were believed to have shot large arrows and simplistic grapeshot, but they were so important they were directly controlled by the Royal Wardrobe.

=== War of Succession ===
Connected to the Hundred Years' War was the War of the Breton Succession, a conflict between the Houses of Blois and Montfort for control of the Duchy of Brittany. The French backed Blois and the English backed Montfort in what became a miniature of the wider conflict between the two countries. The House of Blois had laid siege to the town of Quimper in early 1344, and continued into 1345. During the summer and autumn of 1344, the Montfortist party had fallen apart. Even those who had been John of Montfort's staunchest allies now considered it futile to continue the struggle. It therefore mattered little that in March 1345 John finally managed to escape to England. With no adherents of note of his own, he was now little more than a figurehead for English ambitions in Brittany.

Edward III decided to repudiate the truce in summer 1345, a year before it was due to run out. As part of his larger strategy, a force was dispatched to Brittany under the joint leadership of the Earl of Northampton and John of Montfort. Within a week of their landing in June, the English had their first victory when Sir Thomas Dagworth, one of Northampton's lieutenants, raided central Brittany and defeated Charles of Blois at Cadoret near Josselin.

The follow-up was less impressive. Further operations were delayed until July when Montfort attempted the recapture of Quimper. However, news had reached the French government that Edward's main campaign had been cancelled and they were able to send reinforcements from Normandy. With his strengthened army, Charles of Blois broke the siege. Routed, Montfort fled back to Hennebont where he fell ill and died 16 September. The heir to the Montfortist cause was his 5-year-old son, John.

During the winter, Northampton fought a long and hard winter campaign with the apparent objective of seizing a harbour on the north side of the peninsula. Edward III had probably planned to land here with his main force during summer 1346. However, the English achieved very little for their efforts. Northern Brittany was Joanna of Dreux’ home region and resistance here was stiff. The only bright spot for the English was victory at the Battle of La Roche-Derrien, where the small town was captured and a garrison installed under Richard Totesham.

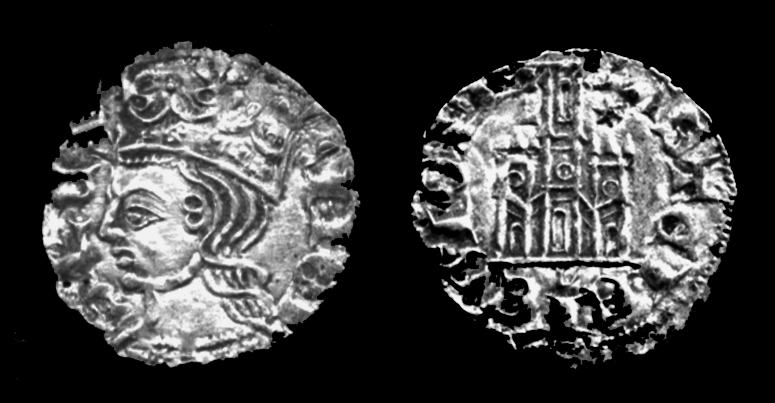
A coin of Alfonso XI of Castile, dated circa 1345.

=== Other events ===
Also in England in 1345, Princess Joan was betrothed to Pedro of Castile, son of Alfonso XI of Castile and Maria of Portugal. She would never marry him, however, but would die of the Black Plague on her journey to Spain to meet him. Spain, meanwhile, continued its struggle to regain Muslim territory on the Iberian Peninsula. In that same year Alfonso XI attacked Gibraltar as a part of the Reconquista, but was unable to conquer it. In 1345 Muhammud V was made its ruler. The York Minster Cathedral, the largest Gothic cathedral in northern Europe, was completed in this year as well. It remains the largest in the region to this day. England was still recovering from French occupation. Until 1345, all school instruction had been in French, rather than English.

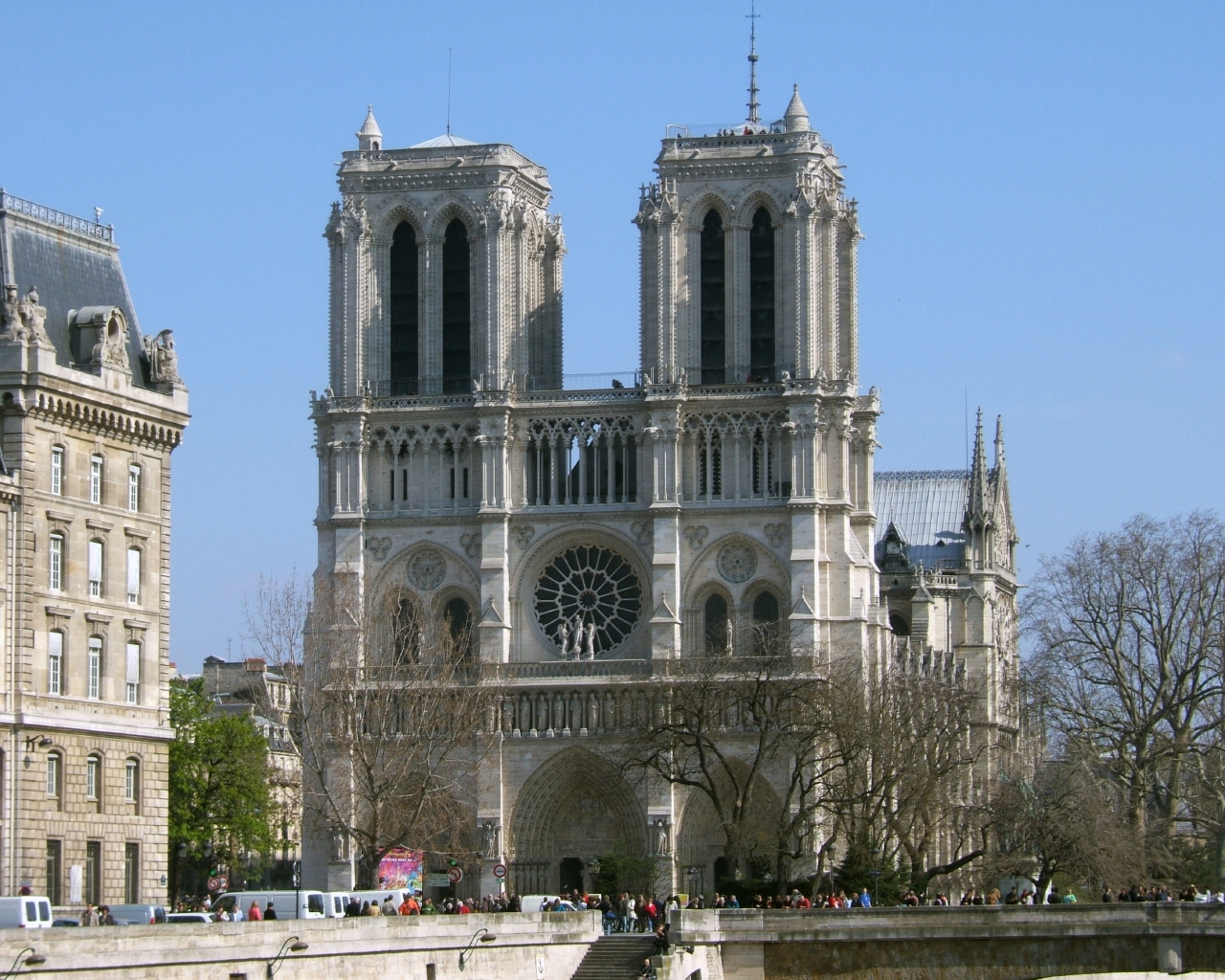
The Notre Dame Cathedral in Paris was completed in 1345.

Besides the War of Succession and the Hundred Years' War, France was in the midst of an interesting period. Several decades earlier, the Roman Papacy had moved to Avignon and would not return to Rome for another 33 years. The Avignon Papacy was then ruled by Pope Clement VI, who was aiding the French in their war against the English with Church funds. Also, in the year 1345, the famous Notre Dame Cathedral in Paris was completed after nearly two centuries of planning and construction. On 24 March, a man named Guy de Chauliac observed a strange astronomical sign: the planets Saturn, Jupiter, and Mars conjoined in the sky under the sign of Aquarius. That same day the area experienced a solar eclipse. This sign was interpreted as foreboding by many, and Chauliac would later blame it for the Black Plague, which arrived less than five years later.

== Central Europe ==
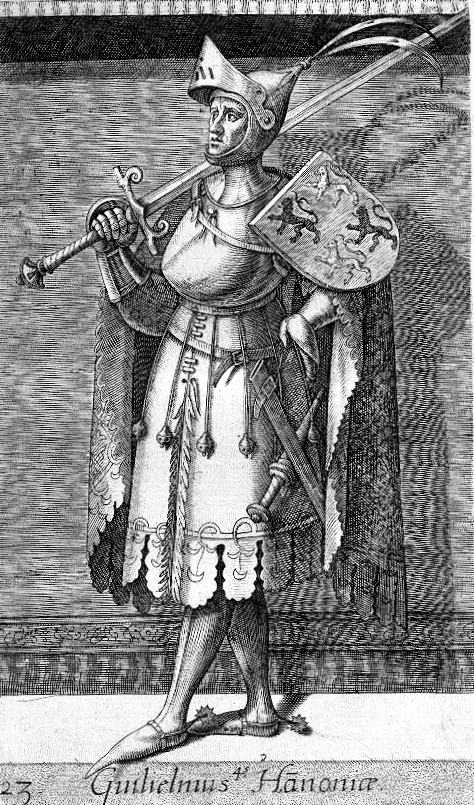
Count William IV, killed in 1345 in the Friso-Hollandic Wars

=== Holy Roman Empire ===
On 1 January, emperor Louis IV's son Louis VI the Roman married Cunigunde, a Lithuanian Princess. Besides this move, the emperor continued his policy of expansion by conferring Hainaut, Holland, Zeeland and Friesland upon his wife Margaret of Holland after the death of William IV at the Battle of Warns. The hereditary titles to these lands owned by Margaret's sisters were ignored. This widened a divide which had already been growing between himself and the lay princes of Germany, who disliked his restless expansion policy. His actions in this year eventually led to a civil war, which was cut short by his death by stroke two years later.

On 12 March, a eucharistic miracle occurred in Amsterdam, now called the Miracle of the Host. It involved a dying man vomiting upon being given the Holy Sacrament and last rites in his home. The Host was then put in the fire, but miraculously remained intact and could be retrieved from the fire in one piece without the heat burning the hand of the person that retrieved it. This miracle was later officially recognised as such by the Roman Catholic Church, and a large pilgrimage chapel was built where the house had stood. Every year, thousands of Catholics take part in the Stille Omgang, or procession to the place of the miracle.

Holland, meanwhile, was in the midst of the Friso-Hollandic Wars, as the Counts of Holland continued their efforts to conquer nearby Friesland in the Battle of Warns. In 1345 William IV, Count of Holland, prepared a military action to conquer Middle Frisia, crossing the Zuiderzee with a large fleet and with the help of French and Flemish knights, some of whom had just returned from crusade. He set sail in Enkhuizen, together with his uncle John of Beaumont, and landed near Stavoren and Laaxum and planned to use the Sint-Odulphus monastery near Stavoren as a fortification. The Hollandic knights wore armour, but had no horses as there was not enough room in the ships, which were full of building materials and supplies.

William's troops set fire to the abandoned villages of Laaxum and Warns and started to advance towards Stavoren. In the countryside around Warns the Hollandic count was attacked by the local inhabitants. With their heavy armour the knights were no match for the furious Frisian farmers and fishermen. As they fled they entered a swamp where they were decisively beaten. Their commander William IV of Holland was killed, and was succeeded by his sister Margaret of Holland, wife of Louis IV. When John of Beaumont heard what had happened, he ordered a retreat to the ships. They were pursued by the Frisians and most did not make it back. Count William's death in this battle paved the way for the Hook and Cod wars, and 26 September, the day of the battle, remains a national holiday in Friesland today.

=== Italy ===
The Battle of Gamenario, fought on 22 April, was a decisive battle of the wars between the Guelfs (Angevins) and Ghibellines (Lombards). It took place in northwest Italy in what is now part of the commune of Santena about 15 km southeast of Turin.

Reforza d'Agoult was sent in the spring of 1345 by Joanna of Anjou, viceroy to northern Italy in hopes of putting an end to the war with the Margravate of Montferrat. Reforza conquered Alba and besieged Gamenario, a castle in the neighbourhood of Santena. Lombard Ghibellines formed an anti-Angevin alliance, headed by John II, Marquess of Montferrat. On 22 April, he confronted Reforza d'Agoult and battle was joined. The meeting was brief and bloody. Initially uncertain, the outcome was a victory for the Ghibellines, who recovered the besieged fortress and dealt a severe blow to Angevin influence in Piedmont. To celebrate his victory, John built a new church in Asti in honour of Saint George, near whose feast day the battle was won. Saint George held a special place for the men of chivalry of the Medieval, because he was the Saint that killed the dragon and was therefore held in a warrior cult.

In the aftermath, Piedmont was partitioned between the victors. John received Alba, Acqui Terme, Ivrea, and Valenza. Luchino Visconti received Alessandria and the House of Savoy (related to the Palaiologos of Montferrat) received Chieri. The Angevins lost almost complete control of the region and many formerly French cities declared themselves independent. The defeat of the Angevins was also a defeat for Angevin-supported Manfred V, Marquess of Saluzzo and the civil war in that margraviate was ended at Gamenario.

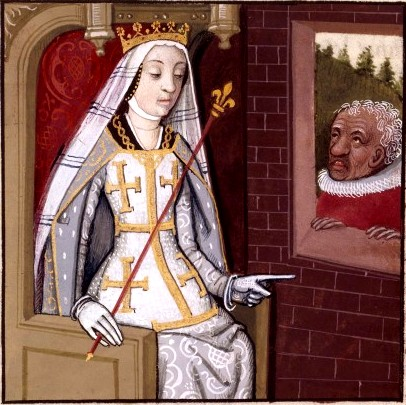
Joan I of Naples, possibly involved in an assassination in 1345

Andrew, Duke of Calabria, was assassinated by conspiracy in 1345. He had been appointed joint heir with his wife, Joan I, to the throne of Naples by the Pope. This, however, sat ill with the Neapolitan people and nobles; neither was Joan content to share her sovereignty. With the approval of Pope Clement VI, Joan was crowned as sole monarch of Naples in August 1344. Fearing for his life, Andrew wrote to his mother Elizabeth that he would soon flee the kingdom. She intervened, and made a state visit; before she returned to Hungary, she bribed Pope Clement to reverse himself and permit the coronation of Andrew. She also gave a ring to Andrew, which was supposed to protect him from death by blade or poison, and returned with a false sense of security to Hungary.

Thus, in 1345, hearing of the Pope's reversal, a group of noble conspirators (probably including Queen Joan) determined to forestall Andrew's coronation. During a hunting trip at Aversa, Andrew left his room in the middle of the night and was set upon by the conspirators. A treacherous servant barred the door behind him; and as Joan cowered in their bed, a terrible struggle ensued, Andrew defending himself furiously and shrieking for aid. He was finally overpowered, strangled with a cord, and flung from a window. The horrible deed would taint the rest of Joan's reign.

Other events in Italy in 1345 include Ambrogio Lorenzetti's painting of a map of the world for the palace at Siena. The painting has since been lost, but the instruments which he used to make it still survive, giving insights into mapmaking techniques of the day. The Peruzzi family, a big banking family and precursor to the Medici family went bankrupt in 1345, and in 1345 Florence was the scene of an attempted strike by wool combers (ciompi). A few decades later they would rise in a full-scale revolt. In Verona, Mastino II della Scala began the construction of his Scaliger Tomb, an architectural structure still standing today.

== Sweden and Lithuania ==
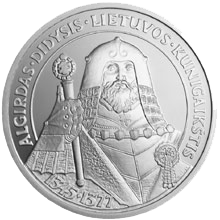
Coin bearing the image of Algirdas, who gained the Duchy of Lithuania from his brother in 1345

In Sweden and states bordering the Baltic Sea, the oldest surviving manuscript from the first Swedish law to be put to paper is from c. 1345, although earlier versions probably existed. The law was created for the young town Stockholm's customs, but it was also used in Lödöse and probably in a few other towns, as well. No town was allowed to use the law without the formal permission by the Swedish king. Its use may have become more widespread if it had not been superseded by the new town law by King Magnus Eriksson (1316–1374). The term Bjarkey Laws was however used for a long time for Magnus Eriksson's law in various locations.

Records also exist for the emigration of Swedes to Estonia in this year. Early mentions of Swedes in Estonia came in 1341 and 1345 (when an Estonian monastery in Padise sold "the Laoküla Estate" and Suur-Pakri Island to a group of Swedes). During the 13th through 15th centuries, large numbers of Swedes arrived in coastal Estonia from Finland, which was under Swedish control (and would remain so for hundreds of years), often settling on Church-owned land.

1345 marked the end of a series of skirmishes begun in the 1343 St. George's Night Uprising. The rebellion, which was by this time limited to the island of Saaremaa, was stifled in 1345. After the rebellion Denmark sold its domains in Estonia to the Teutonic Order in 1346. The fighting had started as a protest by indigenous Estonians to Danish and German rule. Parts of Estonia such as the city of Valga suffered raids from the nearby Lithuanian rulers.

In Lithuania in 1345 Grand Duke Jaunutis was deposed by his brothers. Very little is known about years when Jaunutis ruled except that they were quite peaceful years, as the Teutonic Knights were led by ineffective Ludolf König. The Bychowiec Chronicle mentions that Jaunutis was supported by Jewna, presumed wife of Gediminas and mother of his children. She died ca. 1344 and soon after Jaunutis lost his throne. If he was indeed protected by his mother, then it would be an interesting example of influence held by queen mother in pagan Lithuania. However, a concrete stimulus might have been a major reise planned by the Teutonic Knights in 1345.

== Balkans ==
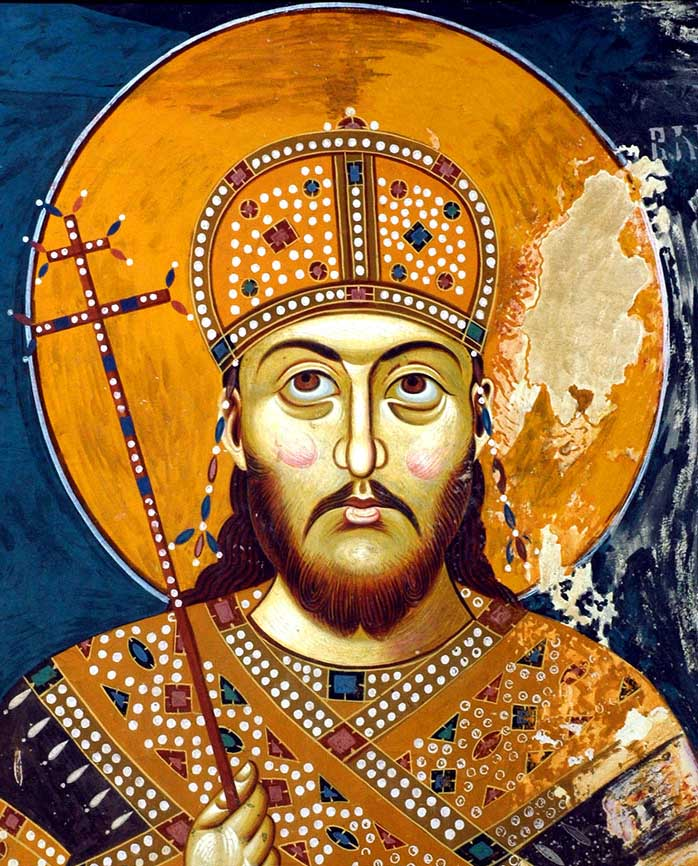
Serbian Emperor Stefan Dušan.

In 1345, the Byzantine civil war continued. Having exploited the conflict to expand his realm into Macedonia, following the conquest of Serres Stefan Uroš IV Dušan of Serbia proclaimed himself "Tsar of the Serbs and Romans". By the end of the year, his Serbian Empire included all of Macedonia, except for Thessalonica, and all of Albania, except for Dyrrhachium, held by the Angevins. The first known line of Serbian text written in the Latin alphabet is dated to this year. Serbia was recognized as the most powerful empire in the Balkans for the next several years.

The Byzantine civil war also allowed the emergence of a local quasi-independent principality in the Rhodope, headed by the Bulgarian brigand Momchil, who had switched his allegiance from John VI Kantakouzenos to the regency in Constantinople. On 7 July, the army of Umur Beg, the Turkish emir of Aydin and Kantakouzenos' chief ally, met and defeated Momchil's forces at Peritheorion. Momchil himself was killed in the battle.

On 11 June, Alexios Apokaukos, the driving force behind the Constantinopolitan regency and main instigator of the civil war, was murdered. His demise led to a wave of defections to the Kantakouzenist camp, most prominently his own son, John Apokaukos, the governor of Thessalonica. He plotted to surrender the city to Kantakouzenos, and had the leader of the Zealots, a certain Michael Palaiologos, killed. The Zealots however reacted violently: in a popular uprising, led by Andreas Palaiologos, they overpowered Apokaukos and killed or expelled most of the city's remaining aristocrats. The events are described by Demetrius Cydones:

...one after another the prisoners were hurled from the walls of the citadel and hacked to pieces by the mob of the Zealots assembled below. Then followed a hunt for all the members of the upper classes: they were driven through the streets like slaves, with ropes round their necks-here a servant dragged his master, there a slave his purchaser, while the peasant struck the strategus and the labourer beat the soldier (i.e. the pronoiar).

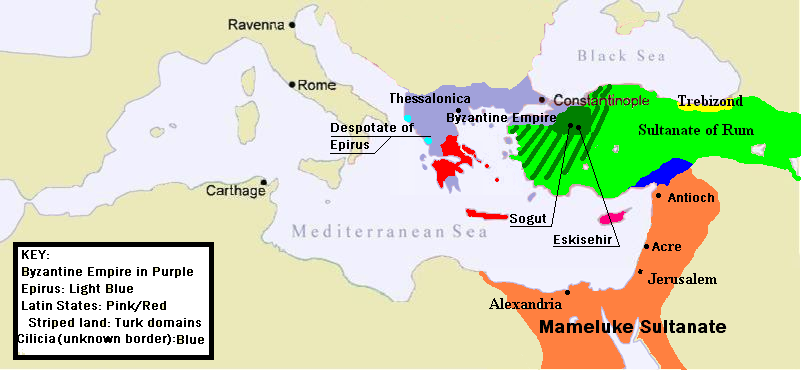
Byzantine Empire in 1328

In 1345, the Greek island of Chios fell to the Genoese Giustiniani. The Genoese also sacked the city of Dvigrad in Istria in this same year. Aquileian patriarchs had for some time fought fiercely against Venetians which had already gained considerable influence on the west coast of Istria. It was during these confrontations that the town fell.

== Anatolian Peninsula ==
In 1344, Hugh IV of Cyprus joined a league with Venice and the Knights Hospitaller which burnt a Turkish fleet in Smyrna and captured the city. In 1345 the allies defeated the Turks at Imbros by land and sea, but Hugh could see little benefit for his kingdom in these endeavors and withdrew from the league. Meanwhile, Umur Beg transformed the Beylik of Aydınoğlu into a serious naval power with base in İzmir and posed a threat particularly for Venetian possessions in the Aegean Sea. The Venetians organized an alliance uniting several European parties (Sancta Unio), composed notably of the Knights Hospitaller, which organized five consecutive attacks on İzmir and the Western Anatolian coastline controlled by Turkish states. In between, it was the Turks who organized maritime raids directed at Aegean islands.

John XIV sparked the civil conflict when he convinced the Empress that John V's rule was threatened by the ambitions of Kantakouzenos. In September 1341, whilst Kantakouzenos was in Thrace, Kalekas declared himself as regent and launched a vicious attack on Kantakouzenos, his supporters & family. In October Anna ordered Kantakouzenos to resign his command. Kantakouzenos not only refused, he declared himself Emperor at Didymoteichon, allegedly to protect John V's rule from Kalekas. Whether or not Kantakouzenos wished to be Emperor is not known, but the provocative actions of the Patriarch forced Kantakouzenos to fight to retain his power and start the civil war.

There were not nearly enough troops to defend Byzantium's borders at the time and there certainly was not enough for the two factions to split – consequently, more foreigners would flood the Empire into a state of chaos – Kantakouzenos hired Turks and Serbs – his main supply of Turkish mercenaries came from the Umur of Aydin, a nominal ally established by Andronikos III. The Regency of John V relied on Turkish mercenaries as well. However, Kantakouzenos began to draw support from the Ottoman Sultan Orkhan, who wed Kantakouzenos' daughter in 1345. By 1347, Kantakouzenos had triumphed and entered Constantinople. However, in his hour of victory, he came to an accord with Anna and her son, John V. John V (now 15 years of age) and Kantakouzenos would rule as co-emperors, though John V would be the junior in this relationship. The unlikely peace would not last long.

The Turks attacked Smyrna on January 17 and the Ottomans annexed Qarasi in west Asia minor. Later, Pope Clement urged further attacks on the Levant.

== Africa ==
Pope Clement VI said in 1345: "the acquisition of the kingdom of Africa belongs to us and our royal right and to no one else." Ironically, in the same year, trade was established between Italy and the Mamluk Sultanate in Egypt. This marked the beginning of reliable trading of spice to the Adriatic Sea.

== Environment ==
At about this date, a major tropical volcanic eruption apparently disrupted weather patterns globally, leading to several years of bad harvests (based on tree ring and ice core evidence) and, indirectly, to spread of the Black Death.

== Births ==
- January 8 – Kadi Burhan al-Din, poet, qadi, and ruler of Sivas (d. 1398)
- March 25 or 1347 – Blanche of Lancaster, wife of John of Gaunt, 1st Duke of Lancaster (d. 1369)
- October 31 – King Fernando I of Portugal (d. 1383)
- December 7 – Thado Minbya, founder of the Kingdom of Ava (d. 1367)
- date unknown
  - King Charles III of Naples, reign 1381–1386 (d. 1386)
  - Eleanor Maltravers, English noblewoman (d. 1405)
  - Helen of Bosnia, queen regnant (d. 1399)
  - John of Nepomuk, Bohemian monk and saint (k. 1393)

== Deaths ==
- January 17
  - Martino Zaccaria, former Genoese Lord of Chios (killed by Turks at Smyrna)
  - Henry of Asti, titular Latin Patriarch of Constantinople (killed by Turks at Smyrna)
- September 18 – Andrew, Duke of Calabria, king consort of Naples (b. 1327) (murdered)
- September 22 – Henry, 3rd Earl of Lancaster, English politician (b. 1281)
- April 14 – Richard Aungerville (also known as Richard De Bury), English writer and bishop (b. 1287)
- June 11 – Alexios Apokaukos, chief minister of the Byzantine Empire (lynched by political prisoners)
- July 7 – Momchil, semi-independent brigand ruler in the Rhodope Mountains (killed in battle)
- July 24 – Jacob van Artevelde, Flemish statesman (b. 1290) (killed by mob)
- July 28 – Sancia of Majorca, queen regent of Naples (b. c. 1285)
- September 26 – William II, Count of Hainaut (killed in the Battle of Warns)
- November 13 – Constance of Peñafiel, queen consort of Pedro I of Portugal (b. 1323)
- date unknown
  - Aedh mac Tairdelbach Ó Conchobair, Irish King of Connacht
  - John Vatatzes, Byzantine general (murdered)
  - John Apokaukos, governor of Thessalonica (executed)
