= Friso-Hollandic Wars =

13th–15th-century series of invasions

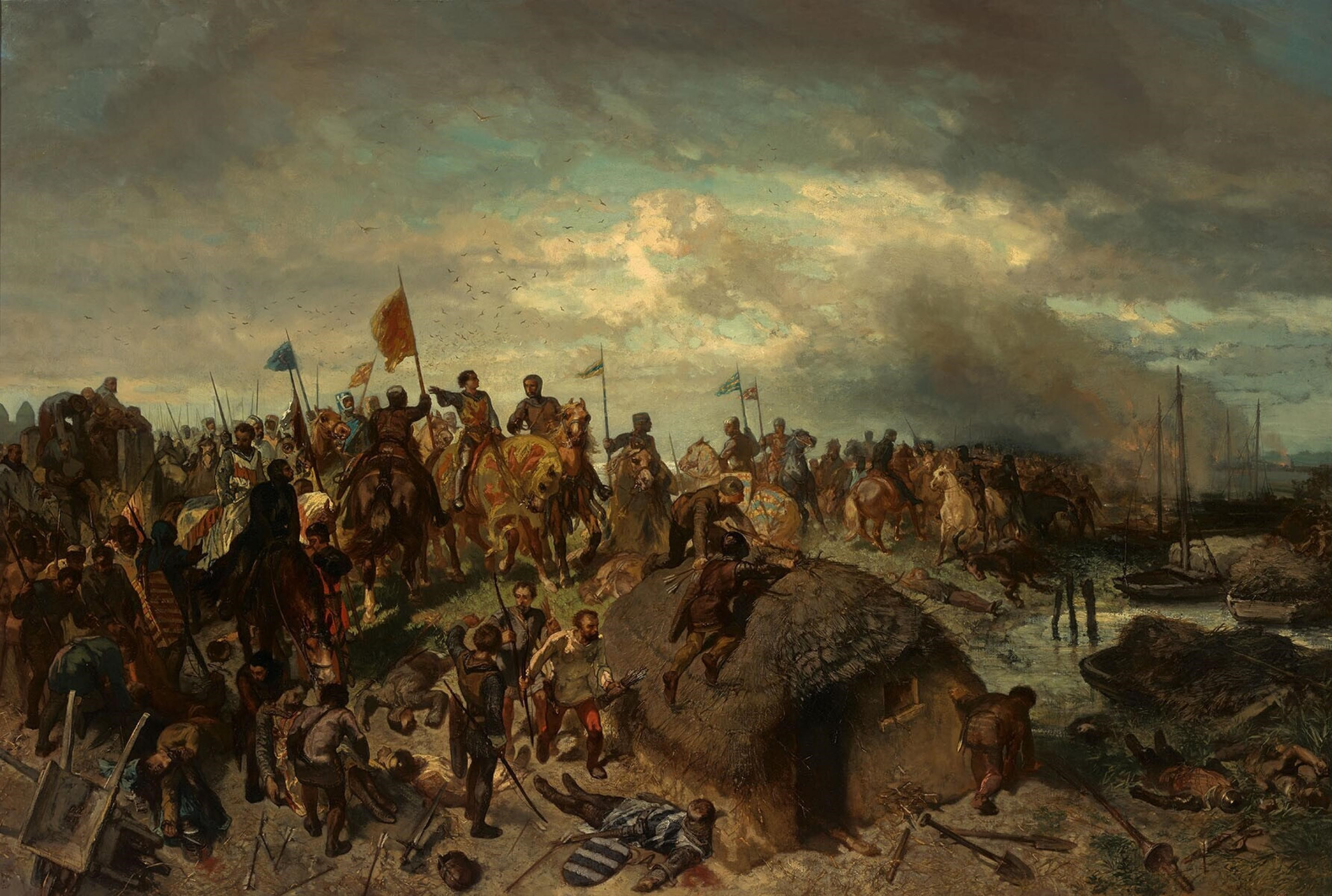
- The Battle of Vroonen depicted by Charles Rochussen
Date	1256–1297, 1324–1348, 1396–1411, and 1421–1422
Location	Netherlands
Result	Holland captures West Frisia, but makes no substantial gains in Middle Frisia

Belligerents
Holland; Zeeland Hainaut	Frisia

Commanders and leaders
William II of Holland; Floris V of Holland; William IV of Holland; Albert I of Holland; William VI of Holland John III of Holland	

The Friso-Hollandic Wars, also called Frisian–Hollandic Wars (Dutch: Fries-Hollandse Oorlogen; West Frisian: Frysk-Hollânske oarloggen), were a series of short medieval wars (ranging from single battles to entire campaigns) consisting of the attempts made by the counts of Holland to conquer the free Frisian territories, which lay to the north and east of their domain. These wars were waged off and on from 1256 to 1297, 1324 to 1348, 1396 to 1411, and from 1421 to 1422, although it could be argued that a state of war continued to exist between the County of Holland and the Frisian territories till well after the year 1500.

== Combatants ==
=== Frisians ===
The Frisians were at that time unique in Europe in that they did not adhere to the feudal system. In fact, since the time the Frisian territories had been part of the Frankish empire of Charlemagne, they had drifted away from mainstream European culture on a separate course, similar to that of the Swiss Confederation. Egalitarianism was such that no noble class started to develop until the late thirteenth century, and even then these "nobles" were only firsts among equals, with only as much power as they could grab, instead of being granted such power by a liege lord. These "nobles" were called chieftains (Dutch: hoofdelingen; West Frisian: haadlingen).

The Frisian freedom took the place of the feudal system in Frisian society. According to a popular myth, Charlemagne had granted the Frisians their freedom, that is to say: freedom from any and every lord excepting the Holy Roman emperor. A fake charter sought to legitimise this freedom, a not uncommon behaviour in those days.

In an age when feudalism was embedded in religion, with every man having a lord above him, a king over the lords and God over all, the Frisian freedoms were seen as a sort of anarchy, or worse, a rebellion against God's will, and scandalised the rest of Europe.

The Frisian lands in those days stretched along a large part of the North Sea coast, including West-Friesland, now part of North Holland, the Dutch provinces of Friesland and Groningen, excepting the city of Groningen, the German districts of Ostfriesland and Friesland and two small areas east of the Weser river, Wursten and Würden.

=== Hollanders ===
The conflicts between the counts of Holland and the Frisians have a long history. Arnulf (died 18 September 993) was the first Hollandic count to wage war on the Frisians.

Since the twelfth century the counts of Holland made claims on a large part of the Frisian territories. It is hard to ascertain what they based those claims on, and although several historians have delved into the matter, they have not as yet come up with any conclusive answers. The case is complicated, because contemporary writers hardly paid much attention to such a side-issue, while later sources are filled with anti-Frisian propaganda.

The usual source which is quoted in this instance, is Melis Stoke, a chronicler in the service of count Floris V of Holland, but although he tries to back up the Hollandic claims on the Frisian territories, he lacks sound arguments. He suspects the counts of Holland obtained their rights as heirs to one Gerolf, Count in Friesland (the operative word here being in), who had been count of Holland during the Franconian period, which was at that time a part of Greater Frisia, but even there he has to admit it is only as suspicion.

In the thirteenth century the county of Holland entered a period of expansion, not unlike those which occurred in England and France at the time. This was at the expense of the Bishopric of Utrecht, but also of peripheral territories like Waterland and West-Friesland.

=== Civil wars ===
Holland and Frisia both experienced protracted civil wars in the same period. In Holland the Hoek and Kabeljauw parties fought for power, and sometimes this was aggravated when there were two candidates for the countship and both sought support among the nobles.

Meanwhile, among the Frisians there were also two parties, the Vetkopers and the Schieringers, and virtually every headling belonged to one of these. Their positions were not always clear; both claimed to fight for the preservation of the Frisian freedom, even though their infighting jeopardised this freedom.

== Relationship between Holland and Friesland ==
Across the Zuiderzee, which is today Lake IJsselmeer, lay the Frisian territories of Westergo and Oostergo (the borders of which approximately coincide with the present-day Dutch province of Friesland).

However, the situation in these territories was quite unlike the one in West-Friesland. The counts of Holland had rivals for these rich lands. The bishops of Utrecht, who were also in the possession of the now Dutch provinces of Overijssel and Drenthe, to the southeast of Friesland, also coveted control of the area. To the east the rich city of Groningen, nominally under the control of the bishop of Utrecht, but quite independent and very influential, was trying to develop its own sphere of influence in the Frisian lands.

The German emperor, who was the only authority recognised by the Frisians, did nothing to rectify their unorthodoxy, which maintained his popularity and kept the counts of Holland from becoming too influential in this corner of his empire.

When emperor Frederick Barbarossa travelled to the Netherlands in 1165, to settle the dispute between the counts of Holland and the bishops of Utrecht over the Frisian territories, he came up with a solution which was virtually guaranteed to keep things as they were. He ruled that the power in the disputed lands should be wielded by both the counts and the bishops in condominium. Count and bishop should together chose a vice-count to rule in their stead. When they could not agree on a candidate, the emperor could name the vice-count himself. Because this system of government could only function when the bishop of Utrecht was a partisan of the count of Holland, usually when a younger brother of the count was named as bishop of Utrecht, usually the status quo remained. When there was a weak bishop the influence of the count in the Frisian territories was greater, but usually still limited to the coastal region opposite Holland and the important trade city of Staveren. When there was a strong bishop the influence of Holland and Utrecht cancelled each other out.

== West Frisian War (1256–1297) ==
In 1256, Count William II of Holland, who was also King of the Romans, that is to say, Emperor elect of the Holy Roman Empire, tried to conquer West-Friesland, which lay to the north of his county, on the same landmass. It was a winter campaign, because the marshy nature of the terrain made a common summer campaign unfeasible for knights on their heavy horses. However, in the Battle of Hoogwoud, the count went through the ice and was killed by the West Frisians.

He was succeeded by his young son Floris V, whose age prevented him from avenging his father immediately. In 1272, however, he resumed his father's war. Although this first attempt of his to conquer the West Frisians failed, and he was forced by circumstances to let the matter rest for a decade, he did not give up.

In 1282 he made another attempt. Unlike William II and his predecessors, this time, Floris V did not attack West-Friesland from the south, but rather, he built a fleet, sailed around the coast, and came at his enemies from the rear. With this strategy, he succeeded in conquering several regions. It took the disastrous flood of 1287 and 1288 for him to finally break the resistance posed by the West Frisians. Even so, it was not until 1289 before all resistance was firmly quashed.

After the death of Floris in 1296, however, a large portion of West Frisia revolted, especially around Westflinge. On 27 March 1297, at a battle near Vroonen (close to present day Sint Pancras) the army of Holland and Zeeland defeated the West Frisians; the village was destroyed during the battle and all the men of West Frisia who could fight (between 15 and 45) were killed, leaving a region of women, children and old folks.

== Détente (1297–1324) ==
After the West Frisians were defeated near Vroonen in 1297 peace prevailed for approximately 27 years. During that time, the Counts of Holland assumed the title of Counts of Holland and West Friesland.

Although there was no warfare, the Hollanders turned their eyes east, to the Frisian territories across the Zuiderzee, in particular to Westergo. And in 1310, count William III of Holland negotiated a reconciliation with representatives of Westergo, whereby the Frisians of Westergo acknowledged him as count and granted him certain rights in their territory in exchange for him recognising certain privileges of theirs.

William III believed that he would be able to quietly assume more rights over time, but the Frisians resisted his efforts. Then in 1323, the agreement between Holland and the Frisians fell apart when William III got impatient with Frisian intransigence and the Frisians started expelling Hollanders and their Frisian supporters.

== Failed conquest of Westergo (1324–1348) ==
In 1324 the rebellion by the Frisians was in full swing. From 1325 to 1327 there were open hostilities at Staveren in Westergo and at sea. Frisian representatives of Staveren opened negotiations with the Hollanders in 1327, which led to a new agreement in 1328, primarily on the same terms as the agreement of 1310, although the Frisians did make some concessions on the appointments of certain officials.

But in 1337 William III died, and his successor, William IV was recognised only in Staveren, as Westergo used the succession to break away from the formal authority of the counts of Holland. This resulted in renewed hostilities, again mainly at sea, between Hollandic and Frisian ships.

In 1344 the pro-Holland party in Staveren was defeated, and Staveren also broke away from the count's authority. In the same year negotiations took place, but the Frisians had, apparently, stiffened their spines since 1327, and refused to make concessions. With a true knight errant as the new count of Holland, this made war virtually inevitable.

=== Battle of Warns (1345) ===
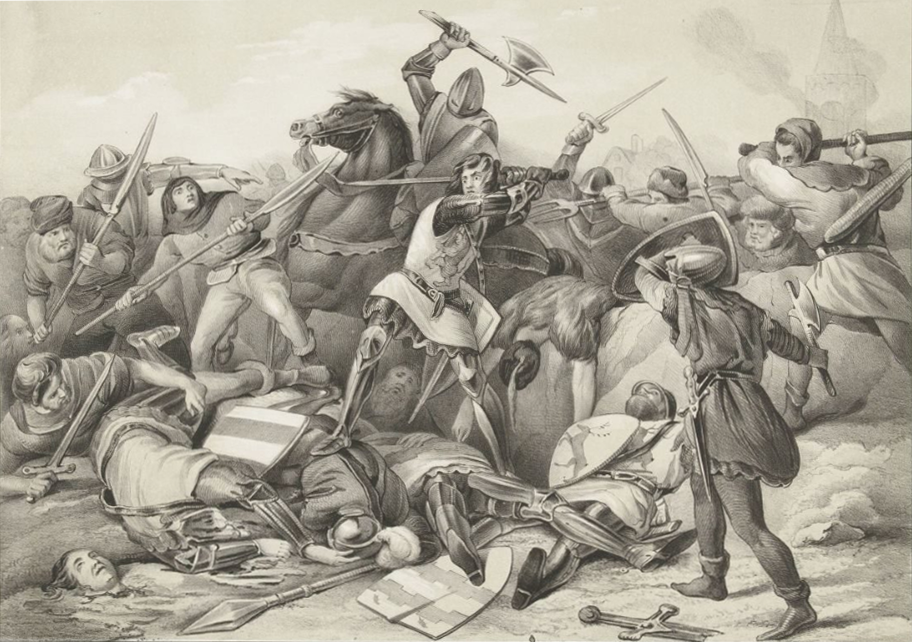
William IV is killed at the Battle of Warns (anonymous lithograph, c. 1854)

In 1345 war erupted again when William IV called his vassals together and crossed the Zuiderzee to Friesland on 26 September. William IV had fought against the Muslims in Granada, travelled through Venice and Cyprus to the Holy Land, and had been on crusade against the pagan Prussians three times. He was not only count of Holland, but also of Zeeland and Hainaut in modern-day Belgium.

Before the battle, a party of knights, led by William's uncle, John of Hainaut, Lord of Beaumont, went ashore south of Staveren, and captured the monastery of Saint Odulphus. What happened next is still not entirely clear.

According to the traditional tale, meanwhile William IV, with the bulk of his army, sailed east past Staveren and went ashore somewhere between the villages of Mirns and Laaxum. From there he marched inland in a northerly direction. At the village of Warns the outraged farmer population, led by a few headlings, came at the knights with whatever weapons came to hand, mainly farm implements. They drove them back to the coast, where the ships that had carried the Hollanders were, on William's orders, standing off from the shore, so retreat was not possible. Almost all of the Hollanders were killed, including the young count himself. This battle was called the Battle of Warns and is still commemorated by the Frisians each year on 26 September.

However, historical research has presented another version. When John of Beaumont took the monastery he had to use violence to do it. This so enraged the Frisians, they drove him and his men out and back to the shore, thus preventing him from attacking the main Frisian force from the rear, as had been the plan. Meanwhile, William IV had disembarked on the coast north of Staveren with an army of approximately 500 men. There he proceeded to burn some houses and attack and kill any Frisian in sight. However, the Frisians had seen him coming and assembled an army of their own, outnumbering William's force. William was ambushed and driven back to the sea, where he and most of his men were killed or drowned trying to swim to the ships in their heavy armor. Among Dutch historians this version is usually called the Battle of Staveren, to differentiate it from the traditional Battle of Warns.

When John of Beaumont heard of his nephew's demise, he evacuated his position and sailed back to Holland.

=== Aftermath ===
The count's death plunged Holland, Zeeland and Hainaut into turmoil as William IV died without an heir. This meant the county reverted to his liege lord, the German emperor Louis the Bavarian, who enfeoffed his own wife, Margaret of Bavaria with it. Margaret was prepared to hand the three counties over to her son William, but only under certain preconditions. This led to a flare-up of the civil war between the Hoek and Kabeljauw parties, with the Kabeljauws trying to bring William V to the countship without any preconditions, while the Hoeks remained faithful to Margaret.

It was clear that there could be no new attack on the Frisians under these circumstances, so apart from some confiscations of Frisian property in Holland, and a renewal of the hostilities at sea, the Frisian issue disappeared into the background. After the Frisians had expressed regret for the death of William IV, on 2 May 1348, the way was free for negotiations about a truce, which went into effect on 22 June.

== Second period of détante (1348–1396) ==
In 1368, during the peace with the Frisians, the Kabeljauws delivered the countship to William V. Thereupon his younger brother, Albert of Bavaria, was called to Holland to succeed him, an event which led to another flare-up in the civil war when a third brother, Louis the Roman, tried to take the countship for himself, with the support of the Hoek nobles.

In 1368, when the truce with the Frisians was nearly over, peace negotiations were reentered, however, these talks resulted in no new agreement. Albert of Bavaria wanted effective control over the Frisian territories, while the Frisians refused to concede. As such, the terms of the initial truce continued in place being extended year after year.

== War for East Friesland (1396–1411) ==
After almost fifty years of peace, Albert of Bavaria resumed the war in 1396 with a large scale military campaign. For this he called up his vassals from Holland, Zeeland, Hainaut and the Upper Palatinate (in modern-day Bavaria) and the nobles who a fief-rent from him, who were mostly from the Rhineland. Furthermore, the Kings of England and France and the Duke of Burgundy sent contingents of knights and men-at-arms.

The main reasons for this sudden return to prominence of the Frisian matter, seem to have had virtually nothing to do with the Frisians themselves. In Holland, the leaders of the Hoek party had been banned since 1393, and Albert had had a falling-out with his son and heir, William of Ostrevant, who was very pro-Hoek and anti-Kabeljauw. Shortly before 1396 though, there was a reconciliation between father and son, which was also meant to heal the rift between the Hoeks and Kabeljauws, promoting their newfound unity at home by making war abroad.

Furthermore, the bishop of Utrecht, Frederik III van Blankenheim, had been very active in the north of late. In 1395 he captured the stronghold of Coevorden, in Drenthe, and if Albert was not quick the bishop would grab the Frisian territories from under his nose.

In August 1396 an army of perhaps 9,000 men, led by Albert himself and William of Ostrevant, landed near Kuinre, which was actually just outside the Frisian borders. However, the Frisians were waiting for them, and the landing cost the Hollanders many lives.

After the landing the Frisian strategy was to prevent the Hollanders from leaving the coast and coming inland. According to the tale of the Hainautian chronicler Froissart the Frisian leader he names Yves Joncre (a giant of a man who had fought in Prussia, Hungary, Turkey, on Rhodes and on Cyprus), who was known to the Hollanders and their allies as le Grand Frison, and who is usually identified as Juw Juwinga, a headling from the city of Bolsward, was one of only a few who argued against this strategy, saying that the Frisians should go home and let the Hollanders try to fight the marshy terrain. He was, however, outvoted.

On 29 August a battle took place, that is usually named the Battle of Schoterzijl. Of course, in 1396 Schoterzijl did not exist yet, but it is clear this battle took place somewhere between the stronghold of Kuinre and the village of Oosterzee. The Frisians were drawn up in a trench they had dug, behind an earthen wall. The Hollanders stormed the wall and a group of Hainautian nobles, among them John of Werchin, the seneschal of Hainaut, and John, Lord of Ligne and Barbençon, managed to get into the trench and break through the Frisian line, then attack it from the rear. At this, the Frisians broke and fled; numbers of casualties on their side range from 3,000 to 400. Most chronicles name Juw Juwinga ("Yves Joncre") as among the Frisian dead.

After the battle, Albert of Bavaria remained at Kuinre for a few more days, but, as Juw Juwinga had predicted, he found it very difficult to operate in the marshy terrain with an army of knights. Furthermore, it started to rain all day, while the sea got more and more tempestuous. On 6 September he gave up and went home, after a campaign of only ten days and with no gains other than revenge for the defeat of 1345 to show for it.

=== Campaign of 1398 ===
After 1396 the war at sea was resumed and in 1397 some small scale attacks were carried out on the Frisian coast at the city of Hindelopen and on the island of Terschelling, but these ended in débâcles.

In 1398 a new large scale campaign was launched. The army, led by William of Ostrevant, landed without problems at Lemmer, and marched along the south coast of Friesland, which is sandy rather than marshy, to the city of Staveren. After a violent skirmish negotiations were commenced, and William was offered a treaty by Gerard Camminga, Tsjerk Waltha, Heere Hottinga, Sjoerd Wiarda, Gotschalk Heslinga, Feye of Dokkum, and Tideman Hopper, the leaders of the Vetkoper party in Westergo and Oostergo. Within two weeks the negotiations resulted in the recognition of Albert of Bavaria as Lord of Friesland. Even the right of the count to appoint officials, which had up until then always been a sticking point in negotiations between the Frisians and the Hollanders, was quickly smoothed over: the Frisians acknowledged this right, as long as the appointed officials were Frisians, not Hollanders. After that Albert wasted no time to take up the administration of his new lands; for instance, on 26 August he appointed eight bailiffs, who, unsurprisingly were all Vetkopers.

The other Frisian party, that of the Schieringers, seemed to acquiesce in this new arrangement.

=== Unrest in Oostergo ===
In September 1398, new problems arose for the Hollanders: an insurrection against their rule broke out in Achtkarspelen, a small Frisian territory on the eastern border of Oostergo. Albert sent 250 English mercenaries to quash the unrest, which was quickly achieved, but the event made clear that Hollandic domination in the Frisian territories could not stop at the eastern border of Oostergo, because then the free territories which lay further east, across the Lauwers river, would always remain a threat to the count's rule.

Albert's solution was to ally himself with representatives of the Vetkoper party from the major Frisian territories between the Lauwers and the Ems: Hunsingo (Ayleko Ferhildema and Reyner Eysinga), Fivelgo (Omeko Snelgersma and Haye Wibben), and Oldambt (Tammo Gockinga and Menno Howarda). Even further eastward he found allies in Widzel tom Brok and Folkmar Allena, who were at that time the most influential headlings in East Friesland, across the Ems, in what is today Germany.

This policy brought Albert in direct conflict with the powerful city of Groningen, which lay south of Hunsingo and Fivelgo, and southwest of Oldambt, and viewed these territories as her own backyard. Negotiations between the count and the city led nowhere and were abandoned, probably before year's end. In February 1399 there was a reconciliation between Groningen and its nominal overlord, the bishop of Utrecht, which shows the city was making preparations to go to war. Meanwhile, Albert was also preparing for yet another campaign in the Frisian territories.

=== Campaign of 1399 ===
In April a new insurrection broke out in Achtkarspelen, and while William of Ostrevant scrambled to get his army across the Zuiderzee to meet this new threat, the message reached him that the Frisians were besieging the city of Dokkum, a stronghold of major importance to the Hollanders in the north of Oostergo, not far from Achtkarspelen. Once across the water, in Staveren, news reached him of major set-back: Widzel tom Brok had been killed in his fight against the Saterlandic Frisians. This meant Holland had lost its most powerful ally in the Frisian territories, one who had probably been meant to attack Groningen from the east.

While he himself waited for reinforcements from Holland, William of Ostrevant sent Gerard of Heemskerk, Lord of Oosthuizen around the coast of Westergo and Oostergo to reinforce the garrison of Dokkum. On 28 May, William of Ostrevant set out from Staveren with his main force. He crossed overland to the village of Holwerd, on the north coast, close to Dokkum, where the Frisians made an abortive attack on his camp. On the next day (2 June) he relieved Dokkum, after which he built a fortress at Ter Luine, east of the city, on the southern bank of the Dokkumerdiep, which connected Dokkum to the sea.

At Ter Luine, the Hollanders had to repel several Frisian attacks. Furthermore, they burned down the village of Kollum, which lay directly south of their position, around 16 June. On 20 or 21 June they gained a resounding victory over the Frisians, although what exactly happened, is unknown.

Meanwhile, the Hollandic army building a fortress at Ter Luine had the city of Groningen worried. In the first week of June the city asked the bishop of Utrecht and the IJssel cities of Deventer, Kampen, and Zwolle for military assistance. Furthermore, Groningen allied itself with the Schieringers in Hunsingo, Fivelgo and Oldambt, who were afraid they would be driven from their lands if the Hollanders – and with them the Vetkopers – won the day.

In Fivelgo, the Schieringers, led by Eppo Nittersum, a headling from the village of Stedum, burned down the vicarage of the village of Westeremden, where Haye Wibben had taken refuge. At Ten Post, they captured a fortress held by Hollanders whose leader was the privateer Pieter Reinersz. Afterwards Reinersz and his men were drowned in the Damsterdiep.

However, the Schieringers realised they could not defeat the main Hollandic force at Ter Luine. So, instead they sought refuge in the city of Groningen, which almost doubled its garrison. Then the Schieringers and Groningers together attacked the fortress at Ter Luine, but they were beaten back, mainly by the efforts of an English mercenary called Pantier, who single-handedly held a dam across a stream against them.

Eventually William of Ostrevant realised he was getting nowhere, and decided to return to Staveren while leaving Ter Luine garrisoned. This retreat was made around the Frisian coast, not overland as he had come, and an incident during it illustrated how little control the Hollanders had left in the eastern part of Oostergo: when two Hollandic boats were stranded by the tide, they were attacked by the Frisians from Achtkarspelen and Kollumerland, and burned with all their passengers and crew.

Meanwhile, in the rest of Oostergo and in Westergo resistance against the Hollanders flared up in many places. Officials appointed by the count were in fear of their life and could not let their guard down anywhere, as is shown by the fate of Simon van Zaanden, the steward of Oostergo and Westergo, who was murdered in the monastery (!) of Klaarkamp, shortly after the relief of Dokkum. But the matter did not end with a few violent incidents. Around the middle of June there was open insurrection in the area surrounding the city of Leeuwarden, the capital of Oostergo, and in the area directly inland from Staveren. From there it spread like an oil spill over the rest of Oostergo and Westergo.

This insurrection can be seen as a consequence of the willful disturbance by count Albert of the precarious internal relations of the Frisian territories. Elevating the Vetkopers inherently made Schieringers his enemies. Then he aggravated the situation by starting to feudalise Oostergo and Westergo, that is to say, he enfeoffed Vetkopers with the lordly rights in a lot of villages, not caring whether or not those villages already had headlings, which in the Frisian state of things was more or less the same as a village lord.

Besides headlings some monasteries also took a prominent part in the uprising, especially the Cistercian monasteries of Klaarkamp, Bloemkamp, and Gerkesklooster, who were known for their pro-Schieringer stance (some hold that the war between the Schieringers and the Vetkopers originated as a feud between the Cistercian monks and their Norbertine counterparts).

By September it had become a general uprising and the Hollanders were driven into retreat everywhere. The fortress at Ter Luine was taken relatively early, probably in the middle of July. It was besieged by a large Frisian force and stormed day and night. The garrison of 200 men, led by Gillis van Schengen was not a match for this and asked for a free retreat, which was granted. Thereupon the city of Dokkum was besieged by Frisians from Oostergo, Achtkarspelen and the Frisian territories across the Lauwers, as well as by men of Groningen. The garrison surrendered around the beginning of September. Close to Leeuwarden the Cammingaburg, the castle of Gerard Camminga, one of Albert's main supporters in Oostergo, was also besieged and captured. Close to the city of Sneek the same fate befell the Rodenburg, the castle of Renik of Sneek, one of Albert's supporters in southern Westergo. Most of the Vetkoper headlings Albert had appointed to prominent positions had to flee to Holland at this point. The most important of these refugees were: Gerard Camminga, Feye of Dokkum, Renik of Sneek, Tsjerk Waltha, Gotschalk Heslinga, Galtke Aninga, Schelte Liauckama, and Bauwo of Sauwerd. Some others of Albert's erstwhile supporters, among them Heere Hottinga, Sjoerd Wiarda, and Haring Harinxma, apparently defected to the Schieringers.

At the beginning of 1400 the Hollanders had lost almost all gains they had made since 1398, and only the city of Staveren, on the Zuiderzee coast, remained firmly in their possession.

=== Siege of Staveren ===
In the autumn of 1399 the Frisians began the siege of Staveren. There were sallies and stormings, but the Frisians could not take the city, and the Hollanders could not control the countryside. Albert of Bavaria tried several times to raise a force for another Frisian campaign, but his efforts came to nothing. This situation lasted until a six-year truce was negotiated, which went into effect on 16 October 1401. In the next years the war was mainly fought at sea again, but around Staveren the situation remained also very tense.

In the interim the Hollanders had different concerns. On the domestic front the troubles between de Hoeks and Kabeljauws had erupted again, this particular part of those wars being called the Arkel War: William of Ostrevant fought John V, Lord of Arkel, the leader of the Kabeljauw party, who had been for years his father's main adviser, but had fallen from grace now.

Furthermore, through their privateering activities, which apparently did not spare neutral powers, the Hollanders had come into conflict with the rich and very influential trade city of Hamburg, which confiscated a fleet of 52 Hollandic ships as a retaliatory measure in the autumn of 1399. Holland regarded this as a declaration of war, and the situation on the seas this resulted in, brought trade along the North Sea coast virtually to a standstill. In the spring of 1401 Hamburg fitted out a large fleet, apparently to take the war to the coasts of Holland. That it did not come to that was due to mediation by the Hanseatic cities of Lübeck, Thorn, and Stralsund, who negotiated a truce, which eventually led to a peace that went into effect in 1403, after arbitration by the Flemish city of Ghent.

Also, Frederik III van Blankenheim, the bishop of Utrecht, decided now was his time to extend his influence in the north. Now that the danger posed by the Hollanders had been averted, the city of Groningen, nominally a possession of the bishopric of Utrecht, again held itself aloof from its overlord. So the bishop stepped into the gap left by the retreating Hollanders, and allied himself with the Vetkopers in Hunsingo, Fivelgo and Oldambt, which led to renewed civil war in those territories, resulting in a resounding victory of the Schieringers, who were again supported by Groningen. Frederik III van Blankenheim reacted to this by calling up his vassals and marching northward. In June 1401 he besieged Groningen, but because the city had taken in a large contingent of Schieringer Frisians, besiegers and besieged were matched in strength. After three weeks negotiations yielded a truce, and the siege was lifted.

The six-year truce between Holland and the Frisians came to an end in the winter of 1403–1404, when it was violated by latent hostilities, mainly initiated from the side of the Frisians, who were still determined to retake Staveren. At this time, Holland was, however, yet again preoccupied with its own internal affairs. On 16 December 1404, Albert of Bavaria died, and was succeeded as count of Holland, Zeeland and Hainaut by his son William of Ostrevant, who ruled as William VI.

From 1404 to 1406 a furious privateering war raged on the sea, which again led to trade coming to a standstill. In 1406, mediation by some Hanseatic cities, Lübeck, Hamburg, Stralsund, Wismar, and Danzig among them, led to a one-year truce, which was renewed in 1407, 1408, and 1409. The attempts of the Hanseatic League to negotiate a lasting peace between Holland and the Frisians, however, failed.

In 1410, the truce expired without the parties having been able to reach an agreement on an extension. As a result, the hostilities at sea were resumed. When the winter of 1410–1411 turned out to be so severe that travel across the Zuiderzee was made impossible by ice-drift, the Frisians decided to try to make use of the situation by trying to capture Staveren (which could not now be resupplied from Holland). In the night of 4 March 1411 some Frisians crossed the frozen moat, climbed the city walls and managed to open the gates to their army. In this way the last Hollandic stronghold in Friesland was retaken.

== Ceasefire (1411–1421) ==
William VI did not immediately react to this setback; he had other things on his mind, being at war with the Duke of Guelders as he was, and receiving messages of the raids his Hoek enemy William, Lord of Arkel was making on his territories all the time. So in June 1411 he made a truce with the Frisians, which was renewed in the following month. When he began organising a campaign for the middle of August, the Frisians became somewhat more accommodating, and a three-year truce could be negotiated, and the campaign was called off. Under the terms of this truce Hollandic merchants got access to coastal towns and villages in Oostergo and Westergo from Dokkum in the northeast all the way around to Lemmer in the southeast; the Vetkoper refugees were allowed to return home; and William VI was awarded a large sum of money.

In 1414, negotiations to extend the truce for another three years failed, so it was only extended for one year. For several successive years after that, it was renewed for one year again.

William VI of Holland died on 31 May 1417, without having achieved anything else with regard to the Frisian war. His death caused a renewed flare-up of the Hoek and Kabeljauw troubles, when his younger brother John of Bavaria tried to take the countship, with the support of the Kabeljauws, from William's daughter Jacqueline of Bavaria, who had the support of the Hoeks, and was married to John IV, the duke of neighbouring Brabant. These circumstance made sure that the Frisian matter disappeared into the background again for the time being.

=== Internal conflict between Frisians ===
On 21 October 1413, the precarious balance of power in East Frisia (in what is today part of Germany) shifted, when the chieftain, Keno II tom Brok, captured the town of Emden. His enemy, the chieftain, Hisko Abdena, who was Provost of Emden, fled across the Ems river to the city of Groningen, where his arrival gave the first impulse to a transfer of power to the Schieringers, led by one Coppyn Jarichs, who was the son of a merchant from Staveren who had settled in Groningen. The old rulers were exiled, and went to seek support from Keno tom Brok, who already had connections with some of the Vetkoper chieftains from Hunsingo, Fivelgo and Oldambt, the Ferhildema family among them. Tom Brok captured Termunten, west of the Ems river, and became such a threat to Groningen, that church treasures were melted down to pay for a mercenary army to protect the city. However, in the night of 14 September 1415 the Vetkopers took Groningen by way of a ruse, whereupon the Schieringers were exiled, and went, unsurprisingly, to seek support from their associates in Oostergo and Westergo.

At this point, the Schieringers were in power in Oostergo and Westergo, and the Vetkopers in Hunsingo, Fivelgo, Oldambt, Groningen and a large part of East Frisia. Neither party found this situation satisfactory, and of course the Schieringer exiles from the Vetkoper territories and vice versa formed a greatly destabilising factor. In 1416, a battle took place at Oxwerderzijl, close to the village of Noordhorn, in which the Schieringer force from Oostergo and Westergo, led by the chieftain, Sikke Siarda, was almost completely destroyed.

This defeat led the Schieringers to seek support for their cause abroad. First they approached Sigismund of Luxemburg, the King of Hungary and Croatia, who was also Emperor elect of the Holy Roman Empire. He did indeed support them, but only with words and little else. Therefore, from 1418 onward, they hesitantly sought contact with John of Bavaria, the Count of Holland.

Meanwhile, the war went on. On 29 August 1419 the Schieringers, again led by Sikke Siarda, won a major victory over a Vetkoper army close to the city of Franeker, the capital of Westergo. However, in May 1420 the Vetkopers sailed around the coasts of Oostergo and Westergo, and took the Zuiderzee city of Hindelopen from the sea. This led the Schieringers to openly start negotiations with John of Bavaria, who had defeated the Hoeks and had finally taken the countship of Holland, Zeeland and Hainaut in the previous year. However, in 1420, the Hoeks, led by Philip of Wassenaar, Viscount of Leiden, had risen again, this time with the support of bishop Frederik III of Blankenheim, and the cities of Utrecht and Amersfoort. When the Schieringers came asking for his support, John was busy besieging the city of Leiden, so he had no aid to give them at that time. Still, on 4 November 1420 the negotiations resulted in a treaty between John of Bavaria and the Schieringers, and at the end of November John sent Henry, Lord of Renesse with a small army across the Zuiderzee.

Even so, around year's end, the Vetkopers who had occupied Hindelopen, led by the East Frisian chieftain, Focko Ukena, captured Staveren, and thereupon the cities of Workum and Bolsward, and the village of Makkum as well, while privateers in the pay of Ocko II tom Brok (the son of Keno II tom Brok, who had died in 1417) took the strategic village of Lemmer, on the south coast. Furthermore, city of Sloten, the most important stronghold of the Schieringers in southern Westergo, where a lot of the Schieringer exiles from the eastern territories had gathered, was besieged by the Vetkopers.

But in the first months of 1421, Gerard van Heemskerk retook Lemmer, and the siege of Sloten was broken by Floris, Lord of Alkemade. After that, the Schieringers recaptured Workum and Staveren on their own, followed at the end of April by Bolsward, and then Dokkum. And on 4 April Oostergo and Westergo acknowledged John of Bavaria as their lord.

=== Division of Frisian territory ===
The success of the Hollanders, however, was short-lived. On 1 September 1421 John concluded a treaty with Ocko tom Brok and the city of Groningen, in which they divided the Frisian territories among themselves: John of Bavaria got Oostergo and Westergo, while Ocko tom Brok and Groningen got all the territories east of the Lauwers river. When this came out, it made a lot of people very angry. The Schieringers felt betrayed, especially those exiles who hoped to return to lands John had now, in effect, given away.

== Final conflict (1421–1422) ==
What followed was a Schieringer insurrection against the Hollanders, which made a very complex situation even more opaque. From this point on, everyone fought almost everyone, and the Hollanders seemed to have fared the worst: they were driven out in numerous places. The Hollandic fortress at Lemmer was captured on 18 January 1422 by Frisians from Doniawerstal and Schoterland, its commander, Floris of Alkemade, was taken prisoner, then executed.

On 1 February a formal reconciliation was concluded between Ocko tom Brok, the town of Groningen, Oostergo, Westergo, Hunsingo, Fivelgo, and the small territories of Vredewold, Langewold, and Humsterland. This took place behind John of Bavaria's back, and when he got wind of it, he demanded it to be rescinded. But at this point he had lost almost all his support in the Frisian territories. His last stronghold there was the city of Dokkum, on the north coast, which was held for him mainly by privateers, who preyed on the ships plying the trade route along the North Sea coast. At the end of May a fleet from the cities of Groningen, Hamburg, and Lübeck sailed to Dokkum, and drove the privateers out, thus depriving John of this last foothold on Frisian soil.

In the middle of June 1422, John contacted his old Schieringer allies to see whether or not there would be any support for him left at all if he organised a new campaign to Friesland. There was not.

== Aftermath ==
Afterwards another truce was concluded between Holland and the Frisians, which was extended again and again without many difficulties. No acts of war were undertaken anymore, although it could be argued that a warlike state continued to exist for over a century, until, in 1524 when both Holland and Friesland came under Habsburg rule.

== Sources ==
- Antheun Janse, Grenzen aan de Macht – De Friese oorlog van de graven van Holland omstreeks 1400, Den Haag (The Hague), 1993, ISBN 90-72627-11-3.
- S.J. van der Molen, Oorsprong en Geschiedenis van de Friezen, Amsterdam, 1981.
- Piter Terpstra, Tweeduizend Jaar Geschiedenis van Friesland, Leeuwarden, (no year given).
- H. Twerda, Fan Fryslâns Forline, Bolsward, 1968.
- Oebele Vries, Het Heilige Roomse Rijk en de Friese Vrijheid, Leeuwarden, 1986, ISBN 90-6553-066-5.

== See also ==
- Arumer Zwarte Hoop
- Schieringers and Vetkopers
