= Laaxum =

Laaxum Laaksum
- Hamlet
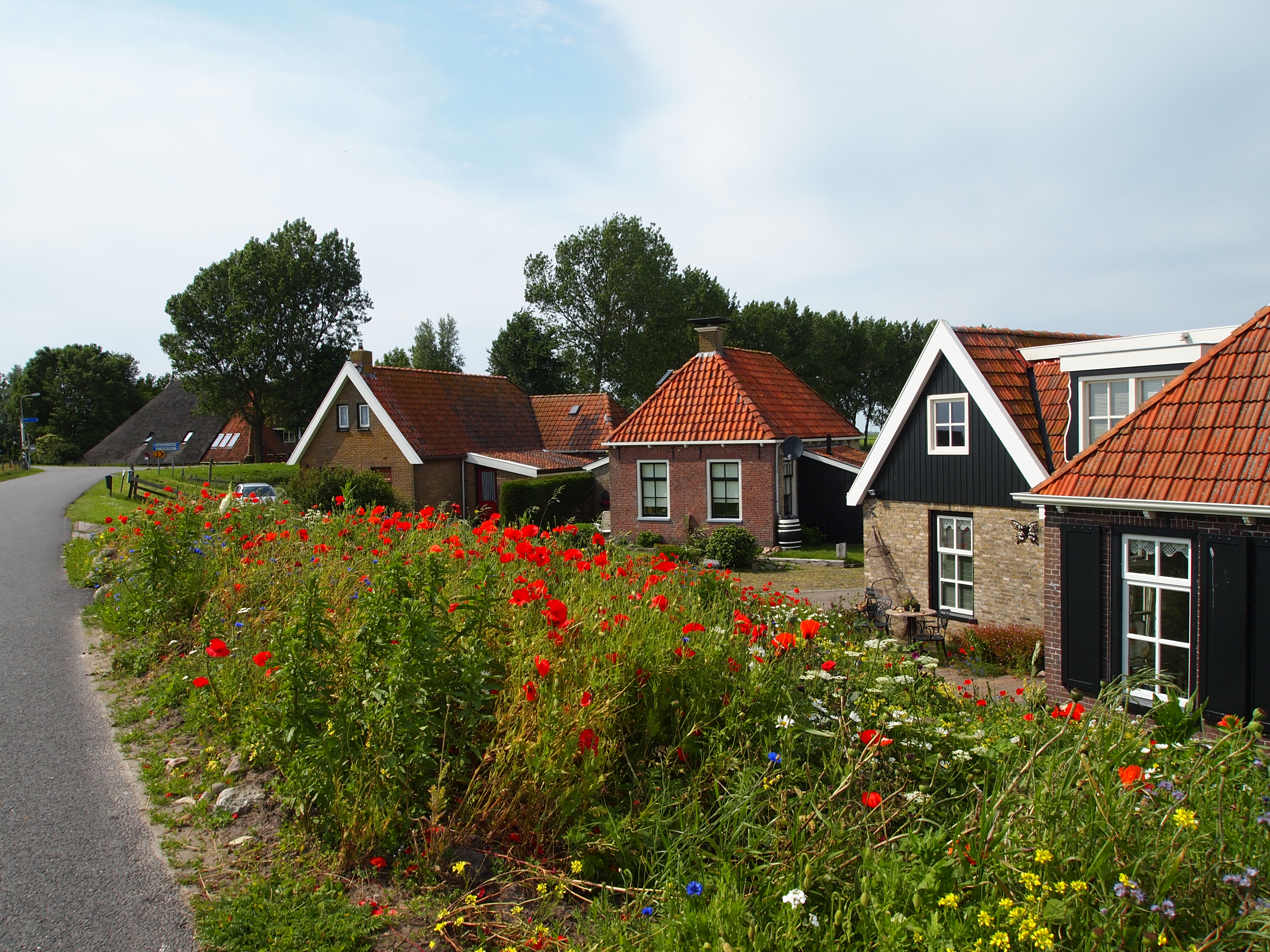
- The village of Laaxum

- Location in the Netherlands Laaxum (Netherlands)
- Country: Netherlands
- Province: Friesland
- Municipality: Súdwest-Fryslân
- Time zone: UTC+1 (CET)
  - Summer (DST): UTC+2 (CEST)
- Postal code: 8721
- Dialing code: 0514

Laaxum (West Frisian: Laaksum) is a hamlet in the municipality of Súdwest-Fryslân in the province of Friesland, the Netherlands.

It is located south of Warns on the edge of the IJsselmeer in the west of the Gaasterland region. The place is addressed both as a village and as a hamlet. A hamlet because it is formally part of Warns and a village because it is a fishing village.

The place is or has been described as the smallest fishing village in Europe. It has only a limited number of houses and a farm. For a long time, it was only a hamlet of the village of Scharl. That only started to change in the 1900s due to the growth of the fishing industry and it was seen as a village when it got its own port in 1912 and the fishing industry was at its peak.

== History ==
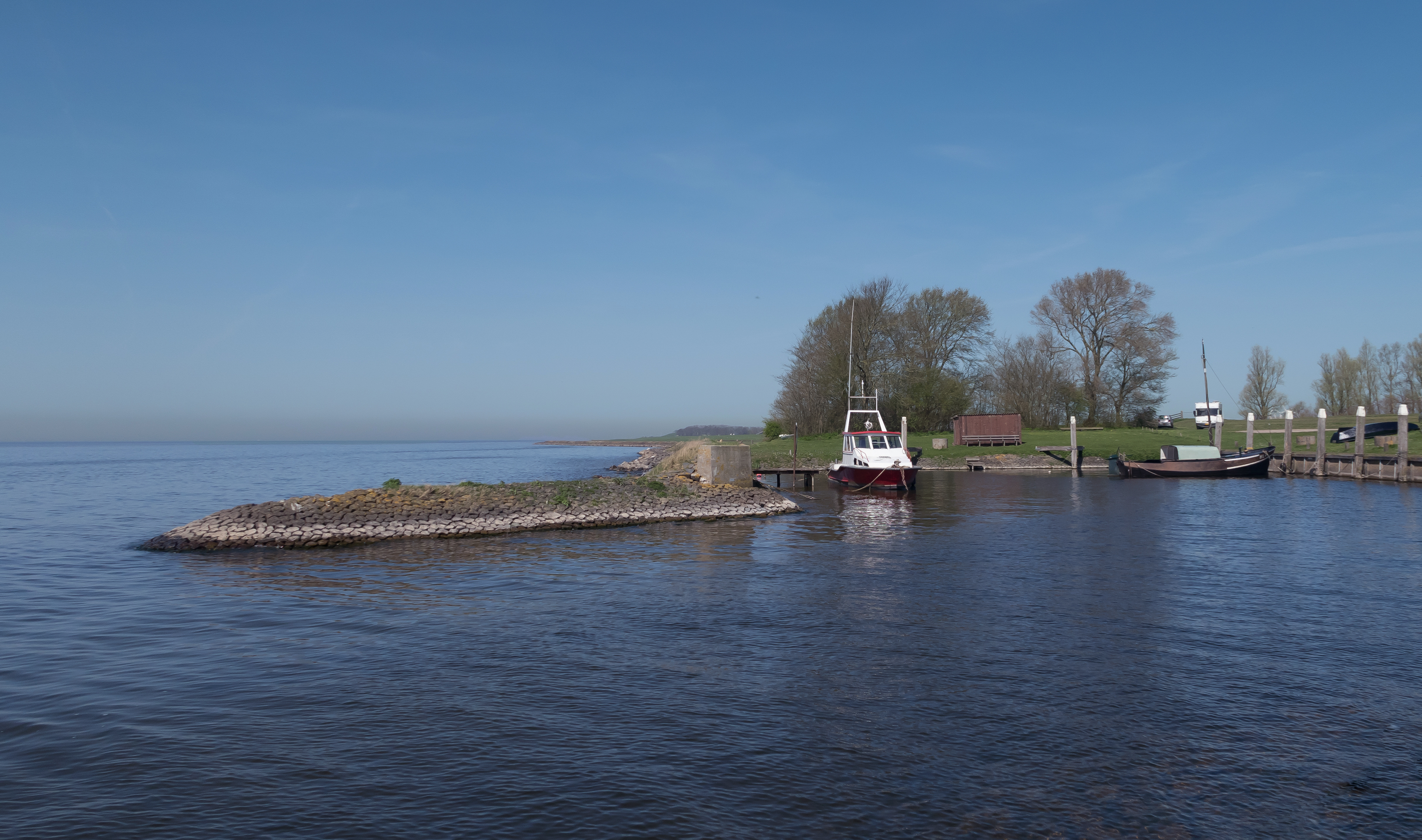
Port of Laaxum

Laaxum was mentioned as Laxnum in 1245 in a copy of a document from 1132. In 1245 the place was also mentioned as Laxum, in 1325 as Laxnum, Laxen, Laxenen and Laezenen in 1487 and the 16th century as Laexum. The mention in the 16th century specifically indicates that it was a hamlet of Scharl. What exactly the place name means is unclear, possibly lak (lax) indicates soft flowing water, referring to the small peat flow where it originated in the swamp area, before the Zuiderzee got its bigger size later on. With that also saying that the place was not yet a fishing village at the time.

Later when the Zuiderzee did become bigger the village was more on the edge of it, with cliffs and the fishery became more important. It is unknown when the small natural harbor came in use before the modern port of 1912. Boats from the small number of fishers of Laaxum probably first docked in places like Mirns. The natural fishing harbor did at least came in use from the 17th century, after the bigger harbor of Mirns was poldered and became the Wielpolder.

In 1345 a (small) army of Count William IV of Holland (William II) came ashore at Laaxum to fight the Frisians, which led to the Battle of Warns.

Around 1500, Laaxum was known for fishing for European flounder on the Vrouwenzand, a shallow area in what was then the Zuiderzee along the southern edge of Friesland. In 1680 it was mentioned that the inhabitants of the hamlet were engaged in eel fishing.

In 1718 there were eight houses in the hamlet and in 1851 six. At the beginning of the twentieth century, Laaxum was a village with sixteen houses and two farms, in which more than a hundred people lived. At the beginning of the twenty-first there were eleven houses and one farm.

After the construction of the Afsluitdijk, the fishing industry in Laaxum collapsed. Eel was still being fished for some time, but it turned out to be unprofitable. The building named Hang is still standing at the port of Laaxum. Herrings used to be salted and smoked in this small building. These were often exported to Germany as Lemster bucklings.

Laaxum meanwhile became popular as a modest attraction for day trippers. That is why there is also a recreation area at the port.
