= Dvigrad =

Abandoned town in Croatia

Dvigrad Castle
- Istria; Croatia
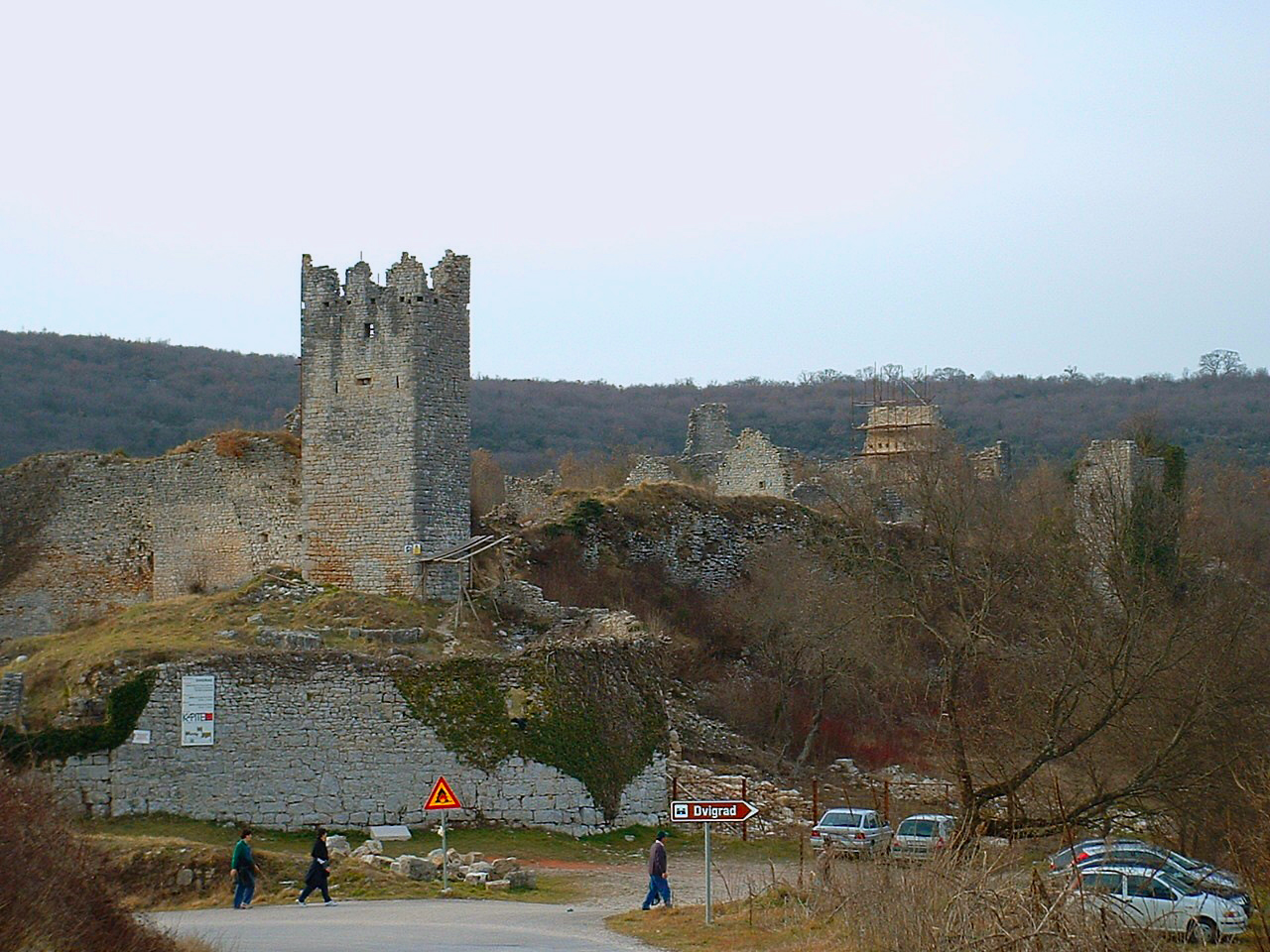
- Dvigrad Castle

Site information
- Type: Castle

Location
- Location within Croatia
- Coordinates: 45.1300°N 13.8300°E

Site history
- Materials: Stone

Dvigrad ("Twin-town"; Italian: Due Castelli, Istriot: Docastei), is an abandoned medieval town in central Istria, west Croatia. It is located in the Draga valley. The history of the settlement is prehistoric; it remained inhabited until the 18th century.

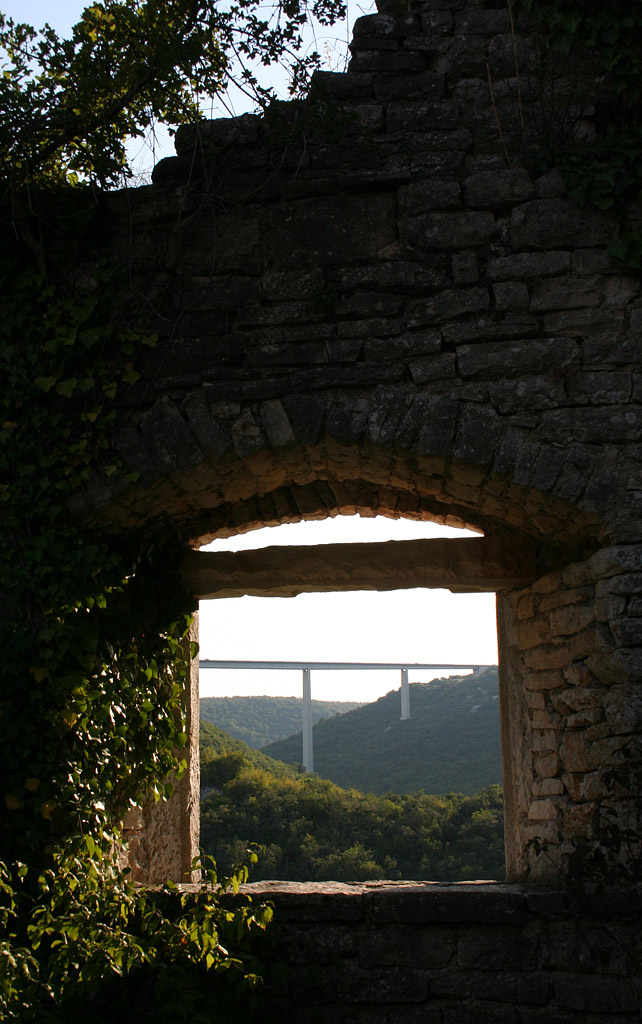

The Regional Programme for Cultural and Natural Heritage in South East Europe is attempting to preserve and reconstruct the town.

== Name ==
The castle has also been known as Duo Castra and Dvograd.

== Bibliography ==
- Girardi Jurkić, Vesna (2009). "Interior Limes in Late Roman Istria (Croatia)". Limes XX: Estudios sobre la frontera romana [Limes XX: Studies on the Roman Frontier] (in Italian). Vol. 1. pp. 119–124. ISBN 978-84-00-08855-2.
