= Battle of Staveren =

1345 battle of the Friso-Hollandic Wars

- Part of the Friso-Hollandic Wars
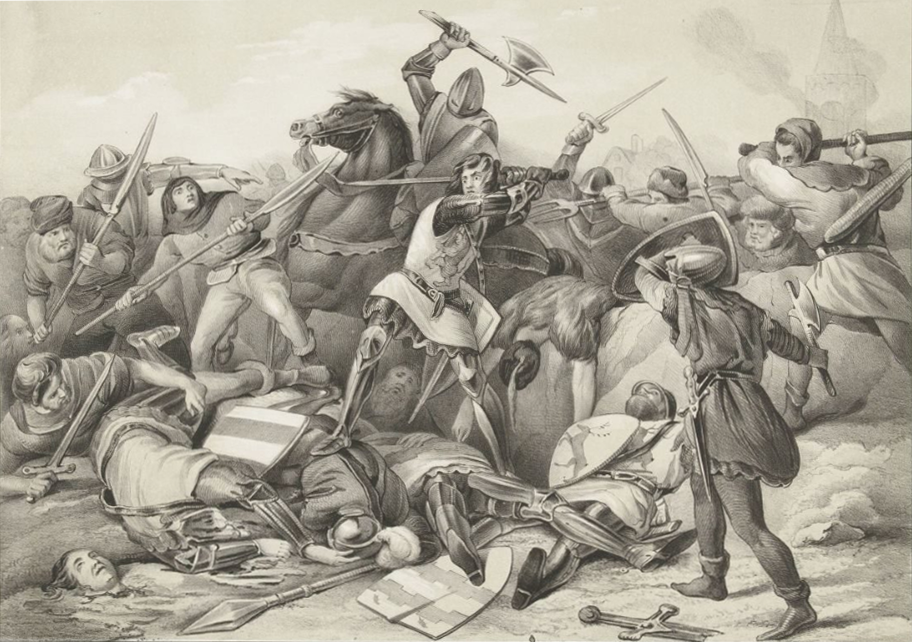
- Anonymous lithograph of William IV's death during the battle (c. 1854)
Date	26 September 1345
Location	Staveren, West Frisia (Friesland)
Result	Frisian victory

Belligerents
County of Holland	Frisia

Commanders and leaders
William IV of Holland †	Frisians

Strength
Unknown	Unknown

Casualties and losses
Unknown	Unknown

The Battle of Staveren, also known as the Battle of Warns (West Frisian: Slach by Warns; Dutch: Slag bij Warns), was a battle of the Friso-Hollandic Wars between Count William IV of Holland and the Frisians which took place on 26 September 1345. The annual commemoration of the battle is important for many nationalist Frisians. The Frisians won the battle and repelled the 'Hollanders' from the eastern coast of the Zuiderzee.

== Attack ==
After the Hollandic counts completed their conquest of West Frisia, they planned the conquest of Middle Frisia, which now forms most of the present province of Friesland.

In 1345, William IV, count of Holland, prepared to conquer Middle Frisia by crossing the Zuiderzee with a large fleet and with the help of French and Flemish knights, some of whom had just returned from a crusade.

He set sail in Enkhuizen to cross the Zuiderzee, together with his uncle John of Beaumont, and landed near Stavoren and Laaxum. They planned to use the Sint-Odulphus monastery near Stavoren as a fortification. The Hollandic knights wore armour, but had no horses as there was not enough room in the ships, which were full of building materials and supplies. William's troops set fire to the abandoned villages of Laaxum and Warns and started to advance towards Stavoren.

In the countryside around Warns, the Hollandic count was attacked by the local inhabitants. Despite their heavy armor, the knights were no match for the furious Frisian farmers and fishermen. The path the Hollandic knights chose to flee led straight to the Red Cliffs.

As they fled, they entered a swamp where they were decisively beaten. Their commander William IV of Holland was killed. When John of Beaumont heard what had happened, he ordered a retreat back to the ships. They were pursued by the Frisians and only a few made it to Amsterdam.

=== Tactical mistakes ===
The battle was marked by a number of tactical mistakes by the Hollanders. First, they divided their force in two. William landed north of Stavoren and his uncle Jan landed south.

In addition, William continued the attack in haste without waiting for his archers. With a small group of 500 men, he reached St. Odulphusklooster because the Frisians purposely moved back. But they then cut William from the bulk of his troops and defeated him.

After Count William was killed, the Frisians turned against his main troops, who could not flee because the ships were offshore. When these troops were defeated, they attacked John of Beaumont, who had not participated until then. The Frisians could beat him because his camp was chosen poorly, with the sea at his back, so that his army had nowhere to retreat. The Frisians took the battle with the Hollanders in the water where they beat them down.

== Losses ==
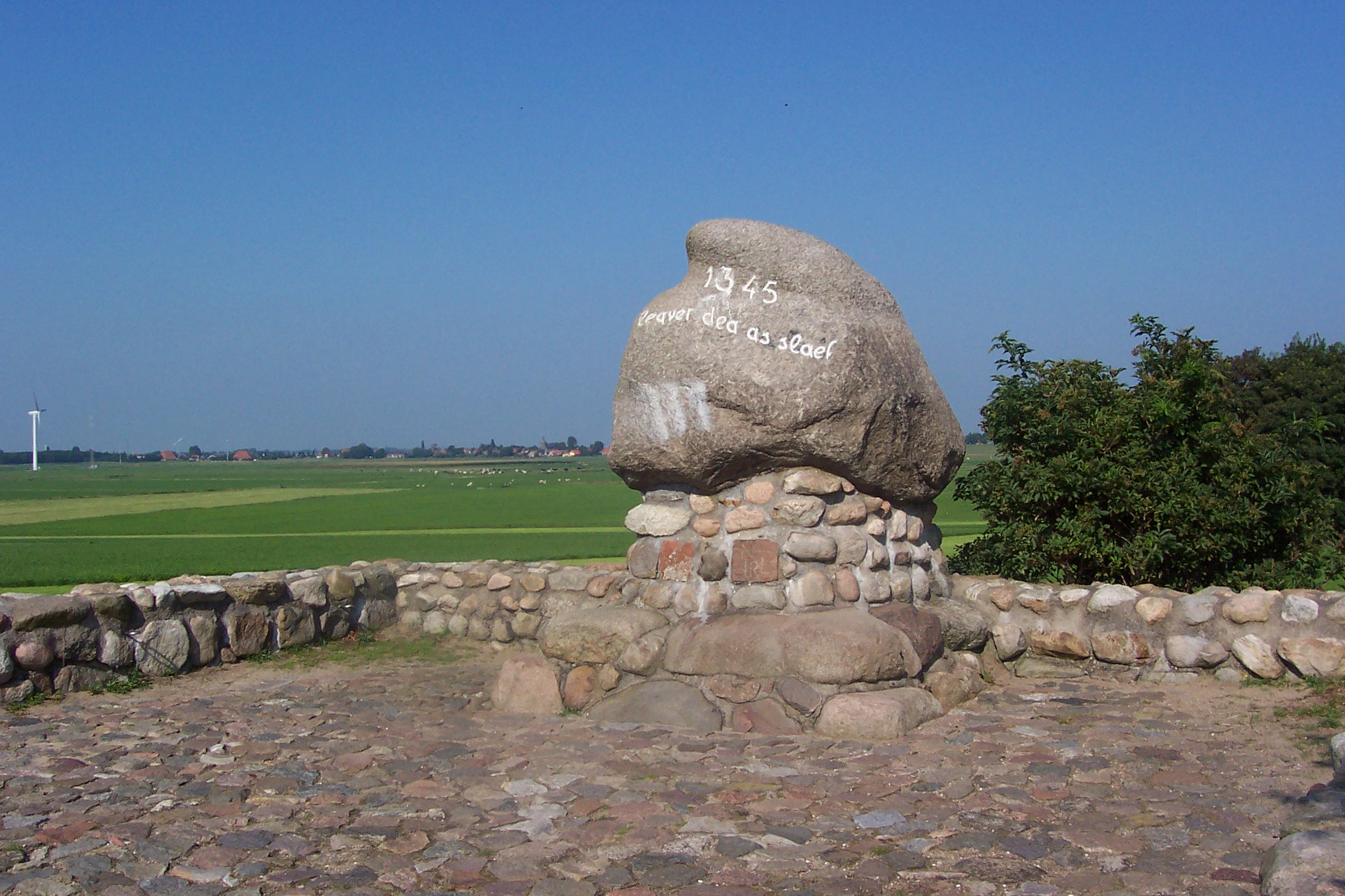
The monument of the Battle of Staveren in Friesland. It says, in Frisian, "Better [to be] dead than a slave".

The disaster sparked many accounts of the losses. In 1869 Van Malderghem made a serious study of the losses on Count Williams' side. He made a list of the deceased, with notes about which source mentioned them. The table shows the part of Van Malderghem's list that he based on the Chronique Anonyme de Valenciennes and Beke. Relevant fragments of the Chronique Anonyme de Valenciennes were published by Joseph Kervyn de Lettenhove in his Histoire et croniques de Flandre.

The author of the Chronique Anonyme de Valenciennes focused on the losses from the County of Hainaut. The monk Johannes de Beke from Egmond Abbey focused on casualties from the County of Holland. Beke thought that the knight bannerets, referred to as 'Domino de' or 'D' and marked with (b), were important enough to mention, even when they were not from Holland.

Name by Van Malderghem	County	C.a. de Valenciennes	Beke	Comment
Henri d'Antoing (b)	Hainaut		D. de Antongen (b)	
Michel I de Ligne (b)	Hainaut	M. de Lingne	D. de Lingni (b)	
Gaultier Lingne	Hainaut	Gautier de Lingne		Brother of the Lord of Lingne
Le Sire de Wal(in)court	Hainaut	M. de Walecourt	D. de Walincord (b)	Jean sire de Walincourt et Cysoing
Thierry de Walcourt	Hainaut		Theodricus de Walkord	
Rasse de Montigny	Hainaut	M. Rasse de Montigny		There were 2 Montigny's in Hainaut
Jean de Lisseroeulx	Hainaut	M. Jehan de Lussereulles		
Jean de Billemont	Hainaut	M. Jehan de Buyllemont		
Henri de Brissoeul	Hainaut	M. Henry de Brisseul		
Gauthier de Mauny	Hainaut		D. de Many (b)	Van Malderghem had doubts here
Gilles de Mauni dit Grignart	Hainaut	M. Gille Grenart		
Thierry de Mauny	Hainaut	M. Thiery de Mauny		
Jean de Mauny	Hainaut	Jehan de Mauny		
Ferri de Hordaing	Hainaut	M. Ferry de Hordaing		

Name by Van Malderghem	County	C.a. de Valenciennes	Beke	Comment
Gerard of Hornes, Gaesbeek etc. (b)	Holland		D. de Hoorn (b)	Gerard II of Horne
Daniel lord of Merwede and Wieldrecht (b)	Holland	M. Daniel de la Merwede	D. de Merwede (b)	
Floris van Haemstede (b)	Zeeland		D. de Haemstede (b)	Floris I van Haamstede
Gerard d'Audenhove dit Mettenbaerde	Jülich	M. d'Adenehove	Gerardus Barbatus	The Lord of Audenhove
Guillaume de Naeldwyck	Holland		Wilhelmus de Naeldwijc	
Simon van Teilingen	Holland		Symon de Teyling	
Thierri van Teilingen	Holland		Theodricus de Teyling	
Nicolas van Arkel dit Oem	Brabant		Nycolaus Oem	
Gui son of Otto van Arkel	Holland		Ghyo de Asperen	
Jean, vicomte de Montfort	Utrecht		Ioh. Roverus de Montford	
Guillaume de Montfort	Utrecht		Wilhelmus de Montford	
Thierri van Zanthorst	Holland		Theodricus de Zanthorst	
Thierri van Swieten	Holland		Theodricus de Zweten	
Herman van Swieten	Holland		Hermannus de Zweten	
Florent van der Merwede	Holland		Florencius de Merwede	Brother of the Lord of M.
Ogier van Spangen	Holland		Ogerus de Spange	
Gérard Ever	Holland		Gerardus Ever	
Alfert van der Horst	Holland		Alfardus de Horst	Van Malderghem is uncertain
Guillaume van Dongen	Holland		Wilhelmus de Dongen	
Gérard de Florenville	Luxembourg		Gerardus de Florevyl	

== Commemoration ==
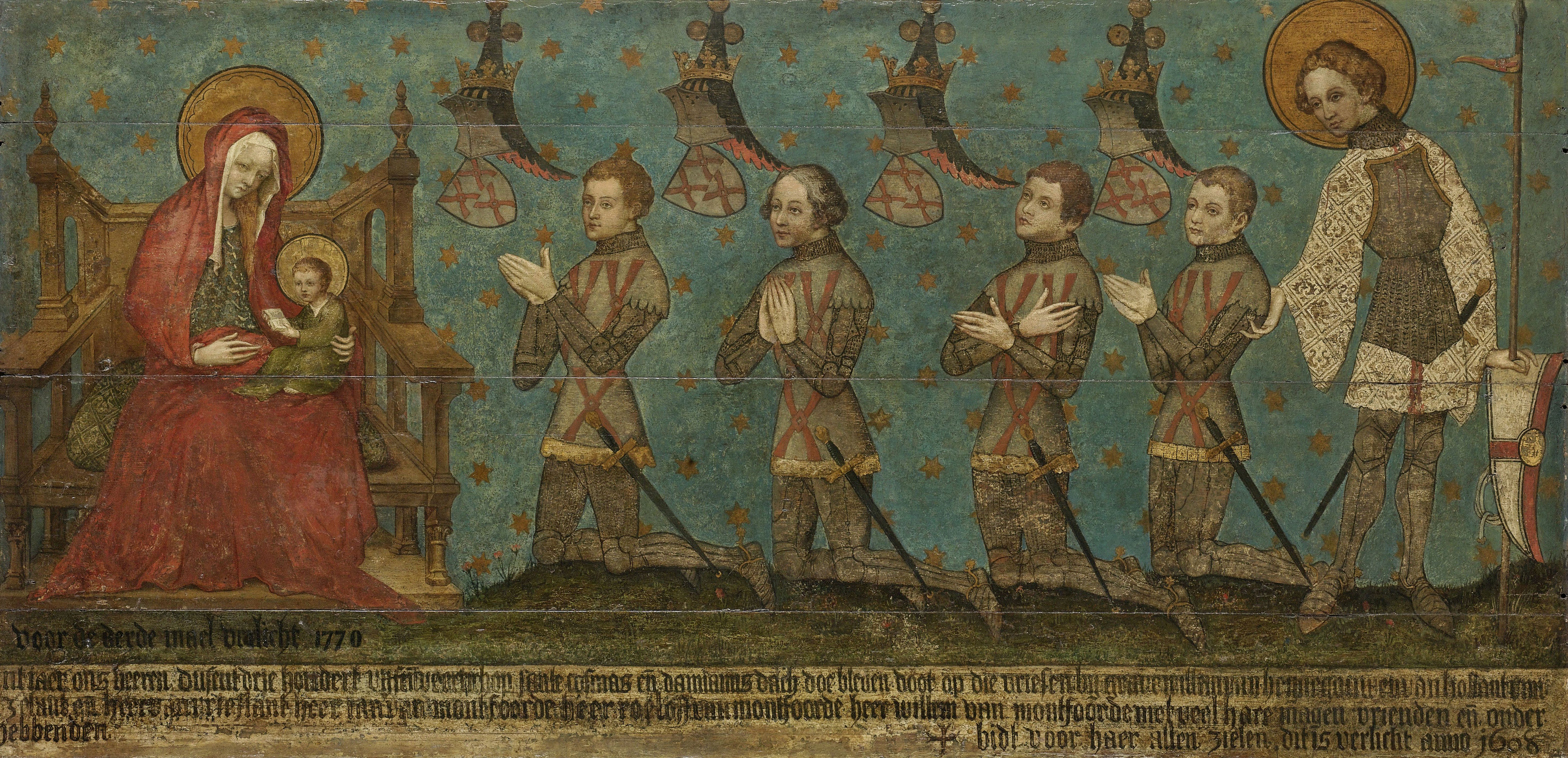
Memorial tablet for the lords of Montfoort, Centraal Museum, Utrecht.

The Battle of Warns was annually celebrated on September 26 until the 16th century. In 1942 the commemoration was restored by Frisian regionalists. Since 1945 it takes place at the last Saturday of September, reinterpreted, however, in the light of the victory over fascism and the upcoming struggle for recognition of the Frisian language. It is celebrated nowadays by Frisians nationalists. There is a monument on the Red Cliffs in Warns since 1951, a large glacial erratic with the 19th-century romantic text leaver dea as slaef [sic] (rather dead than slave). The road to Scharl is traditionally called the ferkearde wei (the wrong way) by locals, as it is considered (according to the 19th-century romantic vision) the way the Hollandic knights chose to their downfall.

The Battle of Warnsveld was the inspiration for the influential historical novel De Roos van Dekama by Jacob van Lennep, published in 1836.
