= Warns, Netherlands =

Warns
- Village
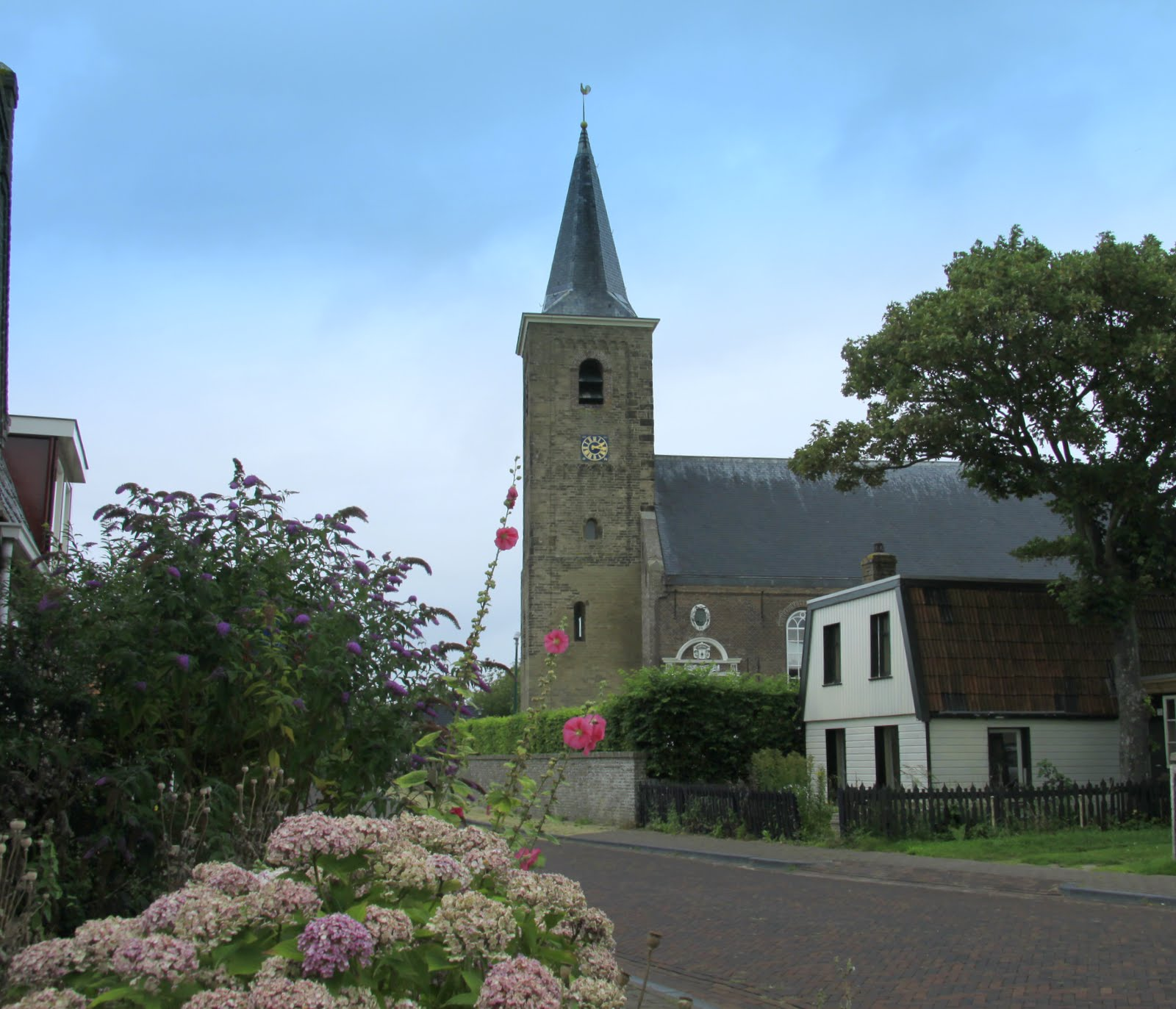
- St John the Baptist Church

- Flag Coat of arms

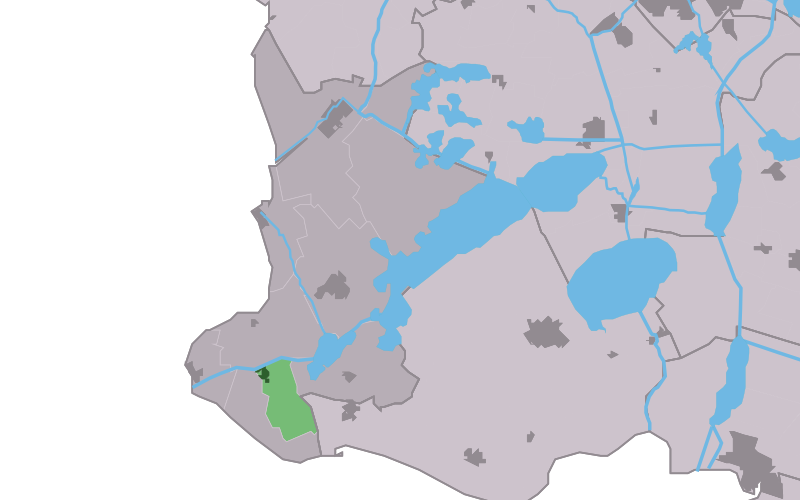
- Location in the former Nijefurd municipality

- Location in the Netherlands Warns (Netherlands)
- Country: Netherlands
- Province: Friesland
- Municipality: Súdwest-Fryslân

Area
  - Total: 5.00 km^{2} (1.93 sq mi)
- Elevation: 0.4 m (1.3 ft)

Population (2021)
  - Total: 705
  - Density: 141/km^{2} (365/sq mi)
- Time zone: UTC+1 (CET)
  - Summer (DST): UTC+2 (CEST)
- Postal code: 8721
- Dialing code: 0514

Warns (Dutch pronunciation: [ˈʋɑr(ə)ns]; West Frisian: [ˈʋãːs]) is a village in the northern Netherlands. It is located in the municipality of Súdwest-Fryslân, Friesland. It had a population of around 720 in January 2017.

Warns is best known for the Battle of Warns. In 1345, count William IV of Holland tried to invade Friesland. A battle took place at the Roode Klif (Red Cliff), a nine metre high clay ridge, on the former Zuiderzee (nowadays: IJsselmeer) where the invasion was stopped. Almost the entire army of Holland including count William were killed during the battle.

== History ==
The village was first mentioned in 1245 as Warlesle, and probably means "settlement of the people of Wardilo (person)". Warns is a stretched out village which developed on the higher clay ridge of Gaasterland in the middle ages. It is located near the former Zuiderzee (nowadays: IJsselmeer). Warns has two village centres: Warnser Noordburen and Warnser Zuidburen.

Warns used to be both an agricultural community as well as a fishing village and has a rather large harbour for its size, and several commander's house.

On 26 September 1345, the Battle of Warns took place between Holland and Friesland. Count William IV of Holland had planned to attack Stavoren from the back, however its army was destroyed at the Roode Klif (Red Cliff). Since 1500, there is an annual remembrance of the battle at Warns on 26 September. The Sytzama Stins was an estate near Warns were a battle took place between the Vetkopers and Schieringers in the late 15th century.

The tower of the Dutch Reformed church dates from the 12th century and received its current spire in 1729. The current church was constructed in 1682. The Reformed Church was built in 1892. In 1999, it was put up for sale. A dozen villagers bought the former church and have transformed it into a multiple purpose cultural centre for the village.

Warns was home to 252 people in 1840. Before 2011, the village was part of the Nijefurd municipality and before 1984 it belonged to Hemelumer Oldeferd municipality.

== Gallery ==
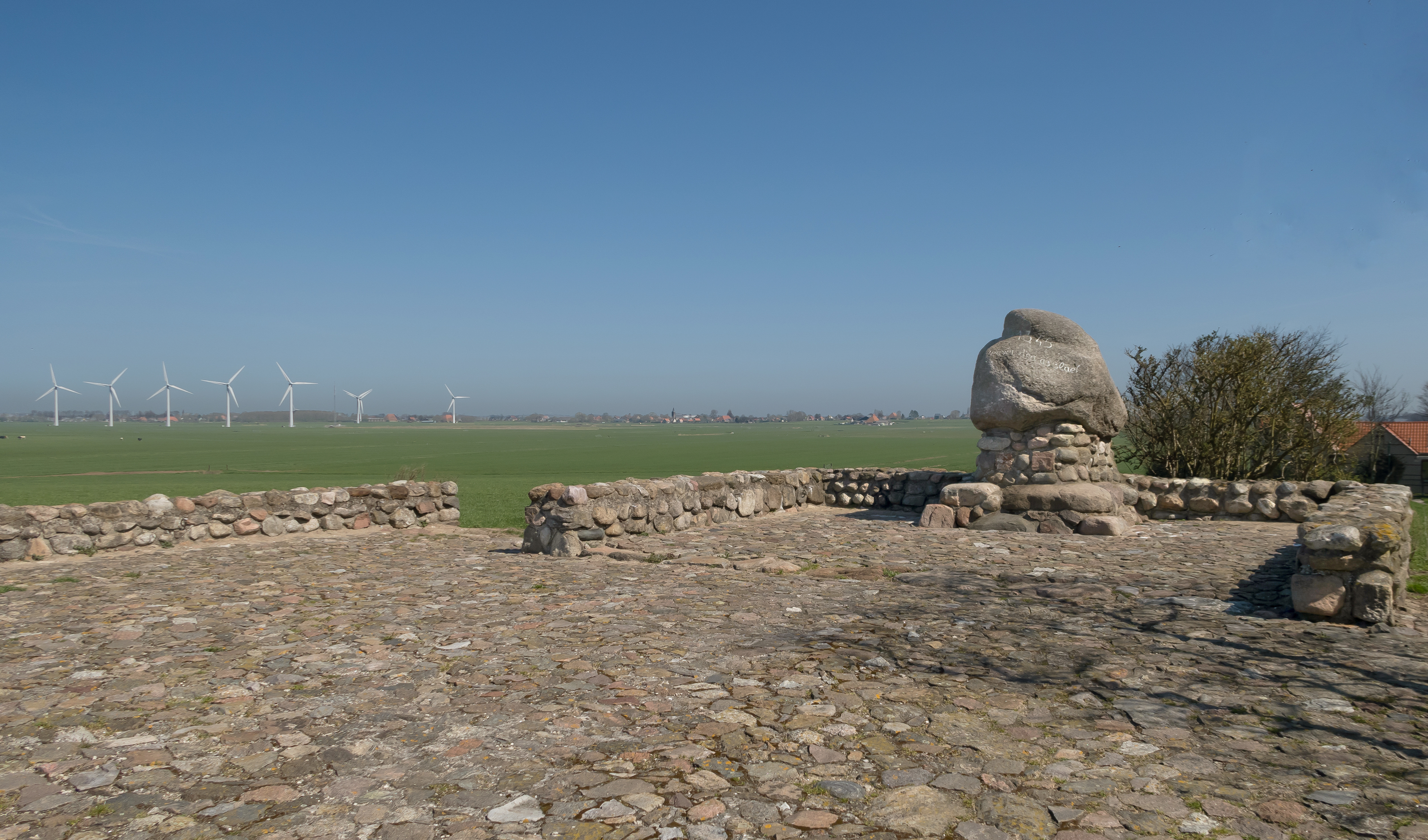
Memorial to the battle at Warns

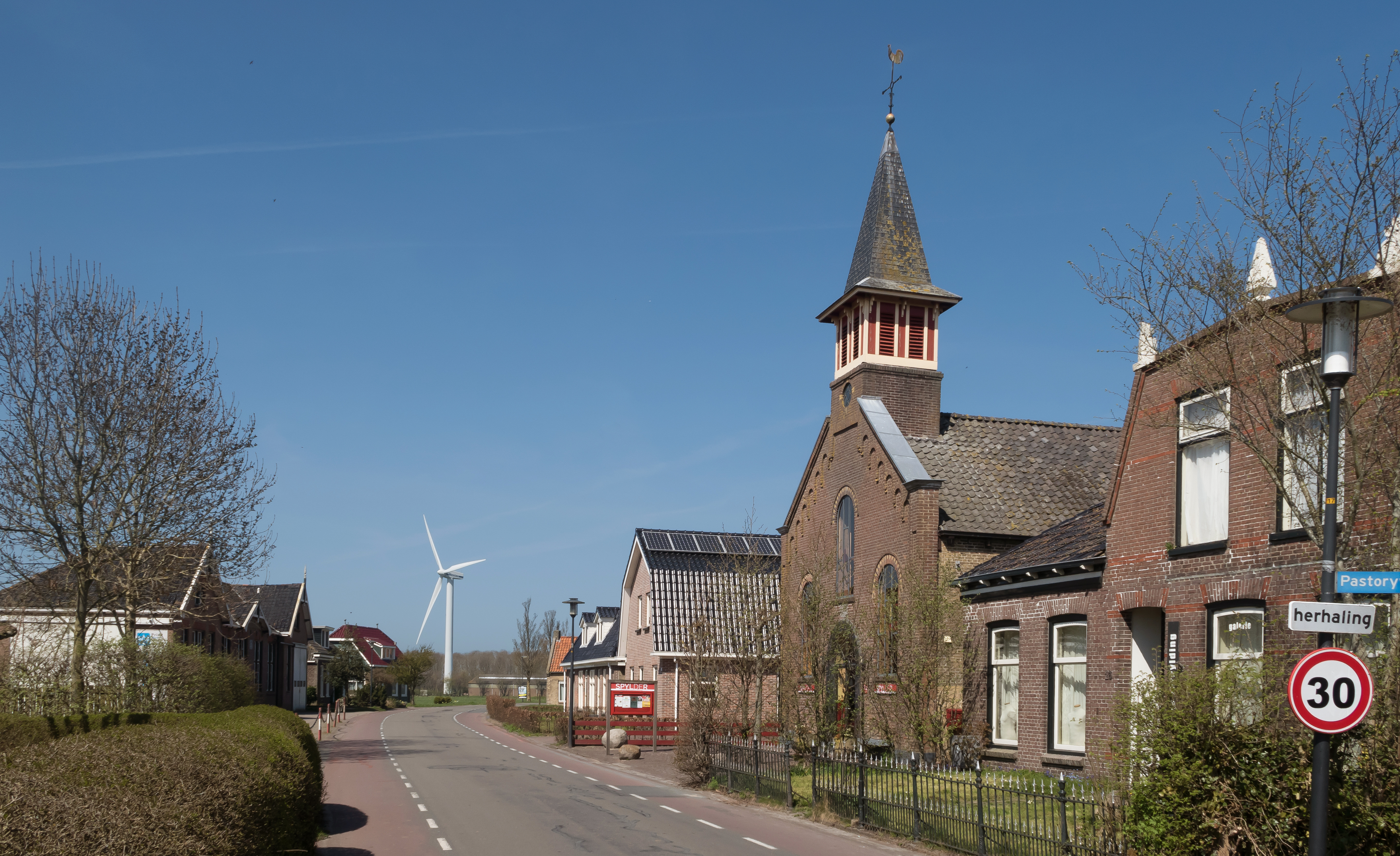
Village house (De Spylder) in the street

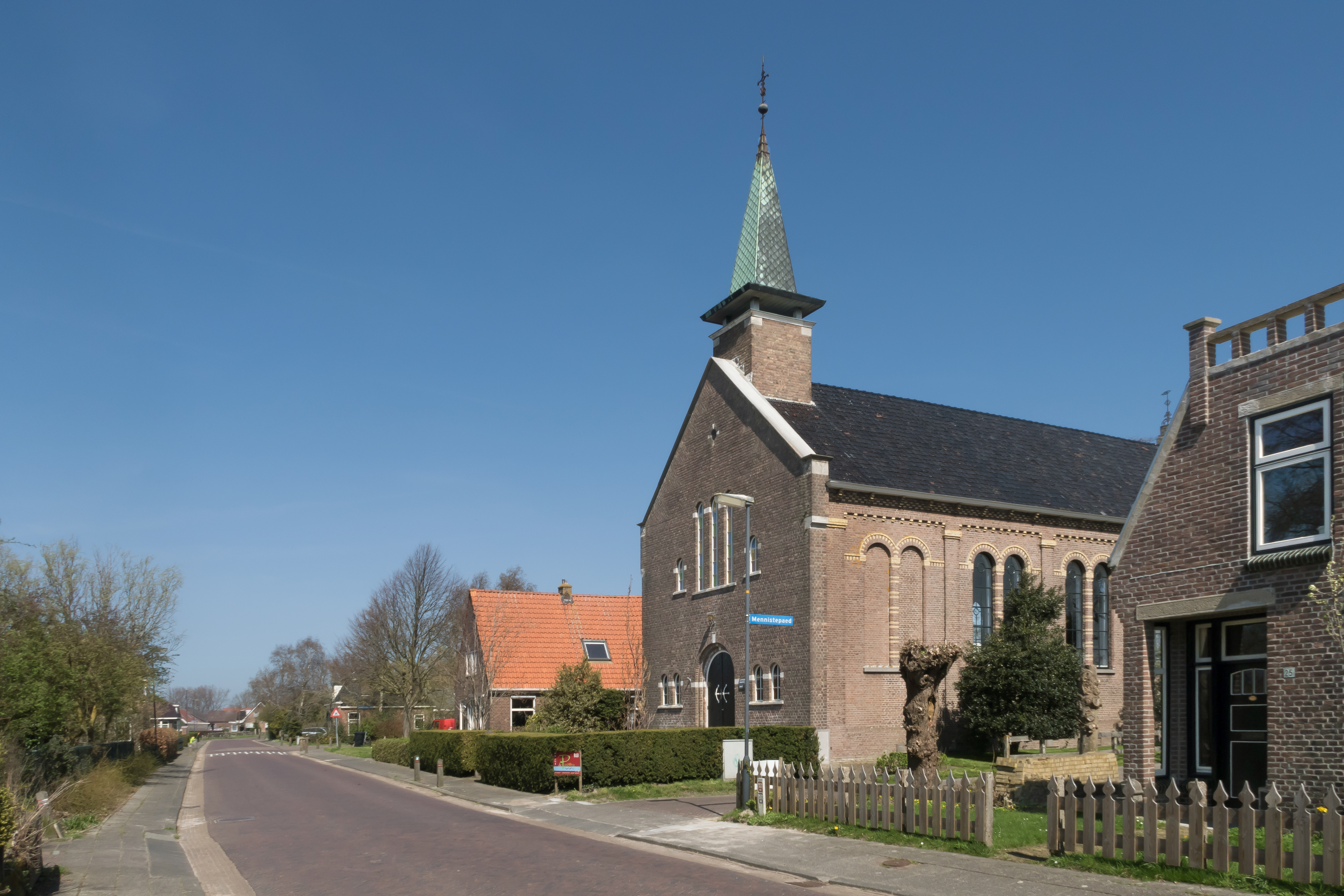
Reformed church in the street

== See also ==
- Battle of Warns
