= William II of Hainaut =

Count of Hainaut from 1337 to 1345

William II
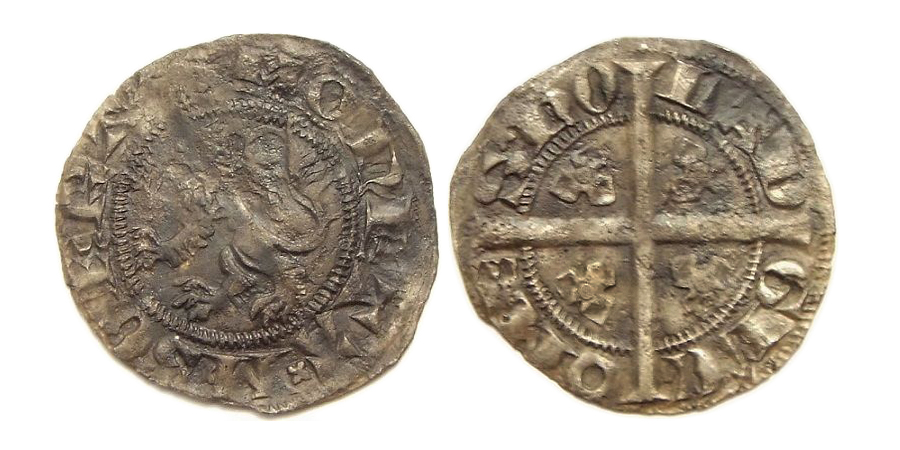
- Holland, 1/4 groat, struck in Geertruidenberg by William IV as Count of Holland.
- Born: 1307
- Died: 26 September 1345; Warns, near Stavoren
- Noble family: House of Avesnes
- Spouse: Joanna, Duchess of Brabant
- Father: William I, Count of Hainaut
- Mother: Joan of Valois

William II (1307 – 26 September 1345) was Count of Hainaut from 1337 until his death. He was also Count of Holland (as William IV) and Count of Zeeland. He succeeded his father, Count William I of Hainaut. While away fighting in Prussia, the Frisians revolted. William returned home and was killed at the Battle of Warns.

== Life ==
William was born in 1307, the son of William I of Hainaut and Joan of Valois.

In 1334, he married Joanna, Duchess of Brabant, the daughter and heiress of John III, Duke of Brabant, but had no issue.

He fought in France as an ally of the English (he was the brother-in-law of King Edward III of England). In 1339, William participated in the Siege of Cambrai (1339). In his capacity as a Count of Holland, in 1340 William granted city rights to Rotterdam. In 1345, two months before he died, he besieged and took Utrecht, because the bishop, John van Arkel, was trying to regain the bishopric's historical independence from Holland.

William fought against the Saracens, and went on crusade with the Teutonic Order in Prussia. He was killed near Stavoren, during one of the battles of Warns against the Frisians in 1345.

William was succeeded by his sister, Margaret of Hainaut, who was married to Louis IV, Holy Roman Emperor. Hainaut, Holland and Zeeland became a part of the imperial crown domains.

== Sources ==
- Boffa, Sergio (2010). "Low Countries (Narrative 1300-1479)". In Rogers, Clifford J. (ed.). The Oxford Encyclopedia of Medieval Warfare and Military Technology. Vol. 2. Oxford University Press. p. 531–552.
- Courtenay, William J. (2020). "King's Hall and Michaelhouse in the Context of Fourteenth-Century Cambridge". In Marenbon, John (ed.). King's Hall, Cambridge and the Fourteenth-Century Universities: New Perspectives. Brill.
- Rosenwein, Barbara H. (2018). Reading the Middle Ages. Vol. II: From C. 900 to C. 1500. University of Toronto Press.
- Vale, Malcolm (2002). The Princely Court: Medieval Courts and Culture in North-West Europe, 1270-1380. Oxford University Press.

== See also ==
- Counts of Hainaut family tree
- Counts of Holland family tree
- Friso-Hollandic Wars

William II of Hainaut House of Avesnes Born: 1307 Died: 26 September 1345
Preceded by William the Good	Count of Hainaut; 1337–1345	Succeeded by Margaret II; Louis
Preceded by William the Good	Count of Holland and Zeeland; 1337–1345	Succeeded by Margaret II; Louis
