= Beatrice of Hungary =

Beatrice of Hungary may refer to

- Beatrice d'Este, Queen of Hungary, the queen consort of Andrew II of Hungary from 1234-1235
- Beatrice of Hungary (1290–1343), a member of the Capetian House of Anjou
- Beatrice of Luxembourg, the queen consort of Charles I of Hungary from 1318-1319
- Beatrice of Naples, the queen consort of both Matthias Corvinus of Hungary and Vladislaus II of Bohemia and Hungary from 1476–1490 and 1491–1502, respectively
