= John II of Viennois =

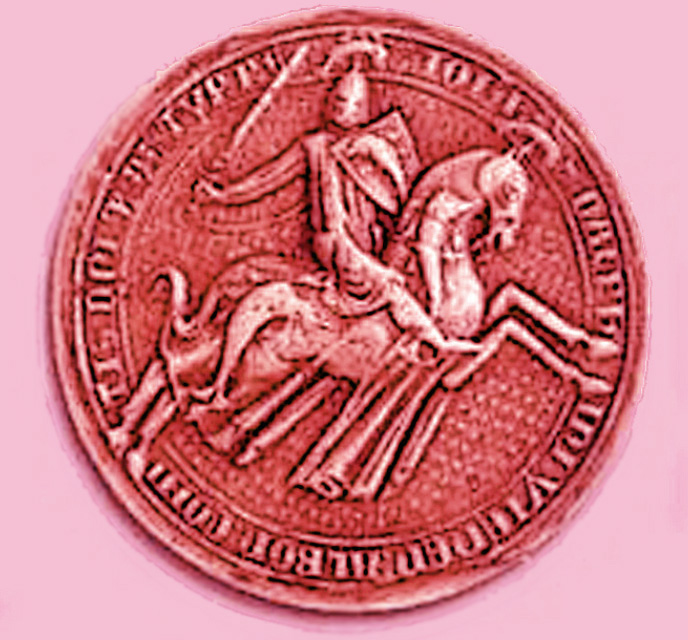

Jean II de la Tour du Pin (1280 – 5 March 1319) succeeded his father Humbert I as dauphin of Viennois (then part of the Holy Roman Empire) from 1306 to 1318. His mother was Anne of Burgundy, dauphine du Viennois.

In 1296, he married Beatrice of Hungary, daughter of Charles Martel of Anjou, titular king of Hungary, and his wife Clemence of Austria. They had two children:

- Guigues VIII (1309 † 1333), dauphin de Viennois.
- Humbert II (1312 † 1355), dauphin of Viennois.
