= Clemence of Austria =

Titular Queen of Hungary

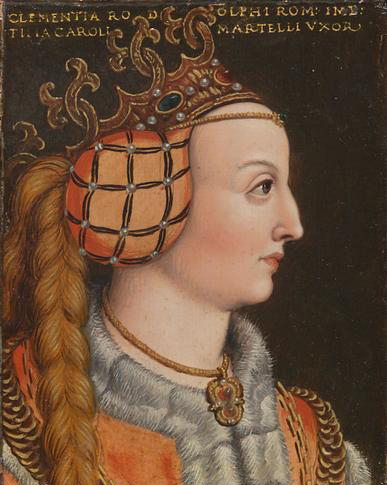
- Portrait by Anton Boys
- Born: 1262; Vienna, Austria
- Died: February, 1293 or 1295 (aged 30–33)
- Burial: Naples Cathedral
- Spouse: Charles Martel of Anjou
- Issue: Charles I of Hungary; Beatrice, Dauphine of Viennois; Clemence, Queen of France
- House: Habsburg
- Father: Rudolf I of Germany
- Mother: Gertrude of Hohenberg

Clemence of Austria (in German: Klementia) (1262 – February 1293, or 1295) was the daughter of King Rudolf I of Germany and Gertrude of Hohenberg. She was a member of the House of Habsburg.

== Marriage ==
On 8 January 1281, Clemence married Charles Martel of Anjou.

Clemence and Charles Martel had three children:

- Charles I of Hungary, became King of Hungary in 1308, married four times; his first wife was Mary of Halics, his second wife was Mary Piast, his third wife was Beatrice of Luxembourg and his fourth wife was Elizabeth Piast. All of his children were with Elisabeth. His only illegitimate child was Coloman, later Bishop of Győr.
- Beatrice of Hungary (1290–1343), the wife of John II of Viennois
- Clemence of Hungary, the second wife of Louis X of France and mother of John I of France.

It is believed that Clemence died in 1293, in relation to the birth of her youngest daughter and namesake, Clemence. Others argue that she died in 1295, months after Charles Martel. She is buried in Naples.

== Queen of Hungary? ==
Charles Martel was set up by Pope Nicholas IV and the ecclesiastical party as the titular King of Hungary (1290–1295) as successor of his maternal uncle, the childless Ladislaus IV of Hungary against whom the Pope had already earlier declared a crusade.

He never managed to govern the Kingdom of Hungary, where an agnate of the Árpád dynasty, his cousin Andrew III of Hungary actually ruled that period. Charles Martel was, however, successful in asserting his claims in parts of Croatia, a kingdom then in personal union with Hungary.

Charles Martel died young in Naples, during the lifetime of his parents. Charles Martel and Clemence's son, Charles would ultimately succeed where he had failed in winning the throne of Hungary.

== See also ==
- Habsburg family tree
