= Charles Martel of Anjou =

- titular King of Hungary and Croatia
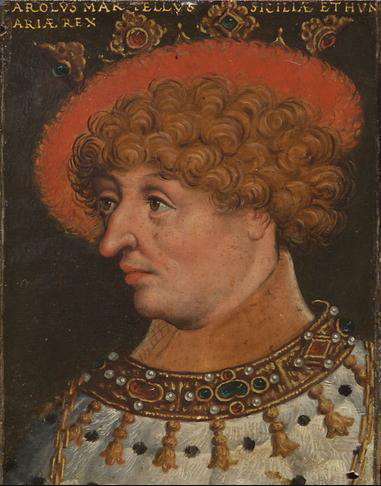
- Charles Martel of Anjou by Anton Boys
- Born: 8 September 1271
- Died: 12 August 1295 (aged 23)
- Burial: Naples Cathedral
- Spouse: Clemence of Austria (m. 1281, d. 1293/1295)
- Issue: Charles I of Hungary; Beatrice, Dauphine of Viennois; Clementia, Queen of France
- House: Anjou-Sicily; Anjou-Hungary (founder)
- Father: Charles II of Naples
- Mother: Mary of Hungary

Charles Martel (Hungarian: Martell Károly, Italian: Carlo Martello; 8 September 1271 – 12 August 1295) of the Capetian dynasty was the eldest son of king Charles II of Naples and Mary of Hungary, the daughter of King Stephen V of Hungary.

The 18-year-old Charles Martel was set up by Pope Nicholas IV and the ecclesiastical party as the titular King of Hungary (1290–1295) as the successor of his maternal uncle, the childless Ladislaus IV of Hungary against whom the Pope had already earlier declared a crusade.

He never managed to govern the Kingdom of Hungary, where an agnate of the Árpád dynasty, his cousin Andrew III of Hungary ruled at that time. Charles Martel was, however, successful in asserting his claim in the Kingdom of Croatia, then in personal union with Hungary.

Charles Martel died of the plague in Naples. His son, Charles (or Charles Robert), later succeeded in winning the throne of Hungary.

Charles was known personally to Dante: in the Divine Comedy, the poet speaks warmly of and to Charles's spirit when they meet in the Heaven of Venus (in Paradiso VIII–IX).

== Family ==
He married Clemence of Habsburg (d. 1295), daughter of Rudolph I, King of Germany.

They had three children:

- Charles I of Hungary (1288–1342), King of Hungary
- Beatrix (1290–1354, Grenoble), married on 25 May 1296 Jean II de La Tour du Pin, Dauphin du Viennois
- Clementia (February 1293 – 12 October 1328, Paris), married near Troyes on 31 August 1315 Louis X of France

== Sources ==
- Earenfight, Theresa (2013). Queenship in Medieval Europe. Palgrave Macmillan.
- Fine, John V.A. (1994). The Late Medieval Balkans. The University of Michigan Press.
- Previte-Orton, C.W. (1962). The Shorter Cambridge Medieval History. Vol. II. Cambridge at the University Press.

Charles Martel of Anjou Capetian House of Anjou Cadet branch of the Capetian dynasty Born: 8 September 1271 Died: 12 August 1295
Titles in pretence
Preceded by another crowned	— TITULAR — King of Hungary and Croatia; 1290–1295	Vacant Title next held by Charles I 6
