= Guigues VIII of Viennois =

French noble

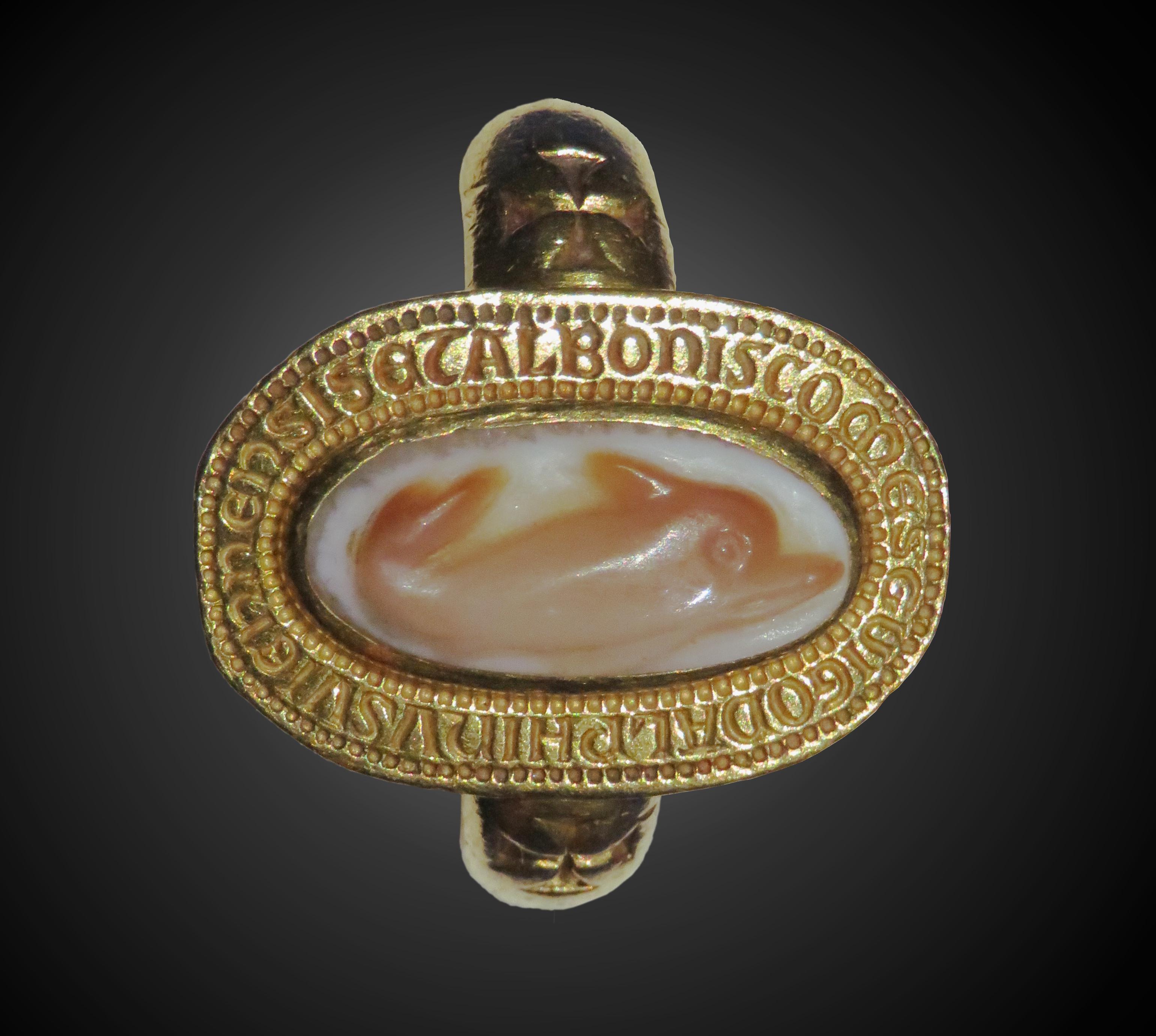
Legend: GUIGO DALPHINUS VIENNENSIS ET ALBONIS COMES

Guigues VIII de la Tour-du-Pin (1309 – 28 July 1333) was the Dauphin of Vienne (then within the Holy Roman Empire) from 1318 to his death. He was the eldest son of the Dauphin John II and Beatrice of Hungary.

== Career ==
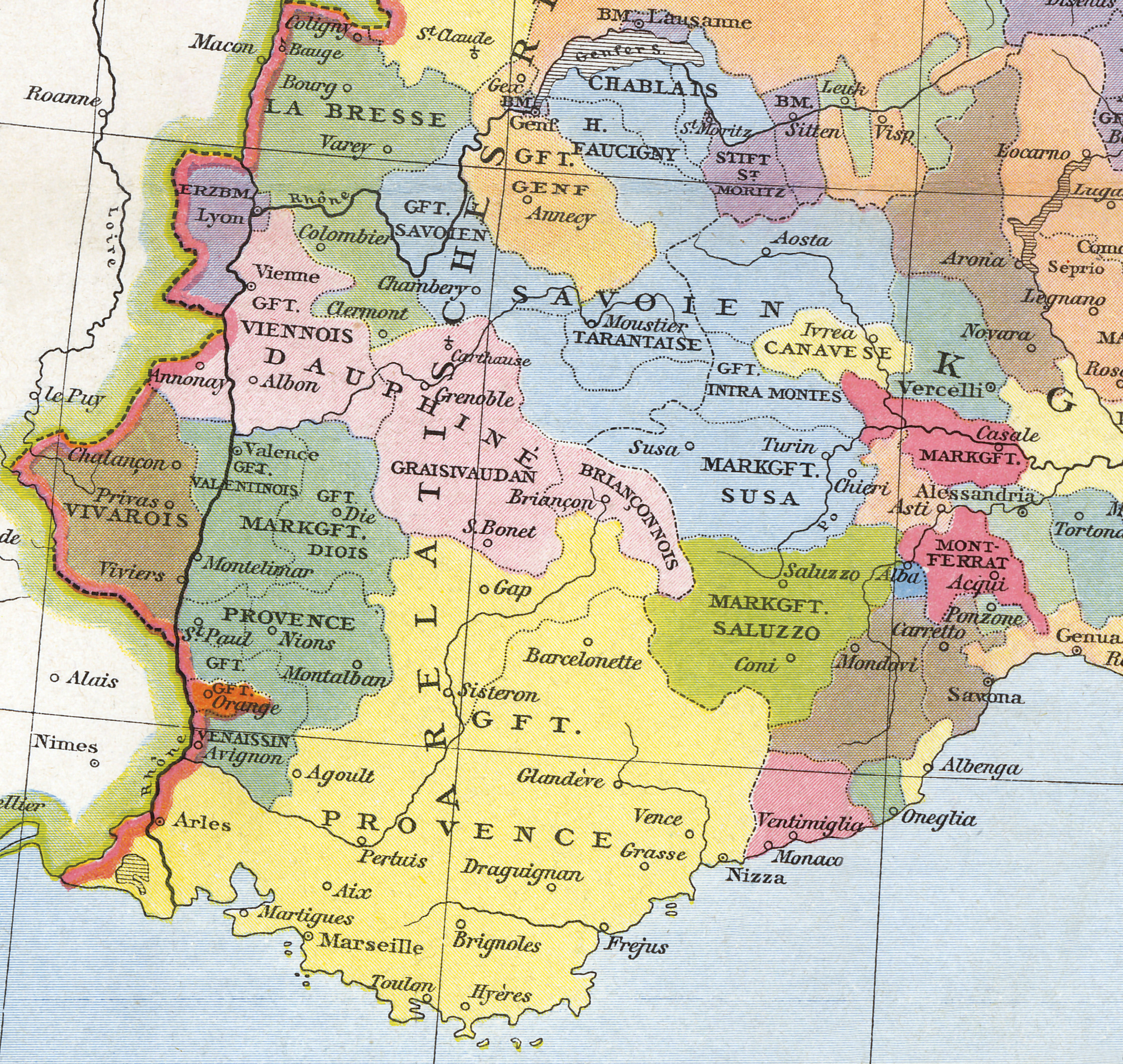
Dauphiné of Viennois (pink), within the Kingdom of Burgundy (Arles), under the suzerainty of the Holy Roman Empire

Only nine years of age when his father died, he succeeded under the regency of his uncle Henri Dauphin, the bishop-elect of Metz, which was exercised until 1323.

Knight and combatant par excellence, in 1325, at the age of sixteen, he won the Battle of Varey, near Pont d'Ain, in a brilliant battle against the Savoyards. Contemporary chronicles say that "l'ost de Savoye fut bellement desconfit." From that date to his death, Guigues was in constant conflict with his Savoyard neighbours.

French influence was reinforced during his reign, especially by his marriage to Isabelle, daughter of Philip V of France. The marriage was contracted in Lyon on 18 June 1316 and celebrated in Dole on 17 May 1323.

In 1328, at the Battle of Cassel, Philip VI entrusted to Guigues the command of the Seventh Corps, with its twelve banners. Guigues contingent lost eighty-two horses in the conflict. In the battle the Flemish burgers were smashed by the French chivalry. For his courage, Guigues was rewarded with the Maison aux Piliers in Grève, Paris.

Guigues was killed while besieging the Savoyard castle of La Perrière in 1333. He left the Dauphiné to his brother Humbert II. He was buried in Saint-André in Grenoble.

== Sources ==
- Cox, Eugene L. (1967). The Green Count of Savoy. Princeton, New Jersey: Princeton University Press. LCCN 67-11030.
- Godefroy, Gisele; Girard, Raymond (1985). Les orfèvres du Dauphiné du Moyen Age au XIXe siècle (in French). Vol. 1. Librairie Droz.
- Schnerb, Bertrand (2024). "After the Battle of Agincourt: A Horse Auction in the Town of Aire, 1416". In Ambühl, Rémy; King, Andy (eds.). Documenting Warfare: Records of the Hundred Years War, Edited and Translated in Honour of Anne Curry. The Boydell Press. pp. 235–246.
