= Beatrice of Hungary, Dauphine of Viennois =

Hungarian noble (1290–1343)

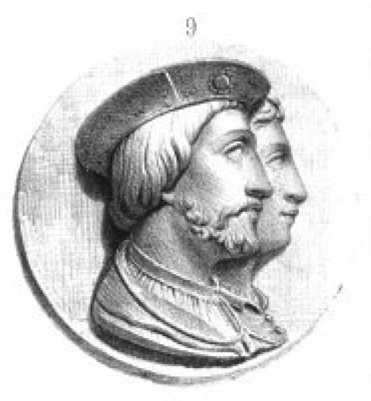
Lithograph of the Dauphins: 9. John II and Beatrice of Hungary

Beatrice of Hungary (1290–1343 or 1354) was a Dauphine of Viennois by marriage to John II of Viennois.

== Life ==
She was the elder daughter and the second of Charles Martel of Anjou and Klementia of Habsburg's three children, making her a member of the Capetian House of Anjou. Beatrice was thus maternal granddaughter of Rudolf I of Germany and sister of Charles I of Hungary and Clementia of Hungary.

In 1296, when Beatrice was just six years old, she was married to John II of Viennois, who was ten years her senior in Naples. The couple had two sons: Guigues VIII and Humbert II.

When her husband died in 1319, Beatrice became a nun at Cîteaux. She remained here until 1340, when she transferred to the Saint-Just-de-Claix Abbey. Her son founded the convent of Saint-Just dans le Royannais for her.

Beatrice died in 1343 (or 1354) in the convent her sons had founded for her.

== Issue ==
- Guigues VIII (1309 † 1333), dauphin of Viennois. Married to Isabella of France
- Humbert II (1312 † 1355), dauphin of Viennois. Married to Marie of Baux

== Sources ==
- Kedar, Benjamin Z.; Phillips, Jonathan; Riley-Smith, Jonathan; Chrissis, Nikolaos G., eds. (2017). Crusades. Vol. 15. Routledge.
- Previte-Orton, C.W. (1962). The Shorter Cambridge Medieval History. Vol. II. Cambridge at the University Press.
