= Humbert II of Viennois =

14th-century French nobleman

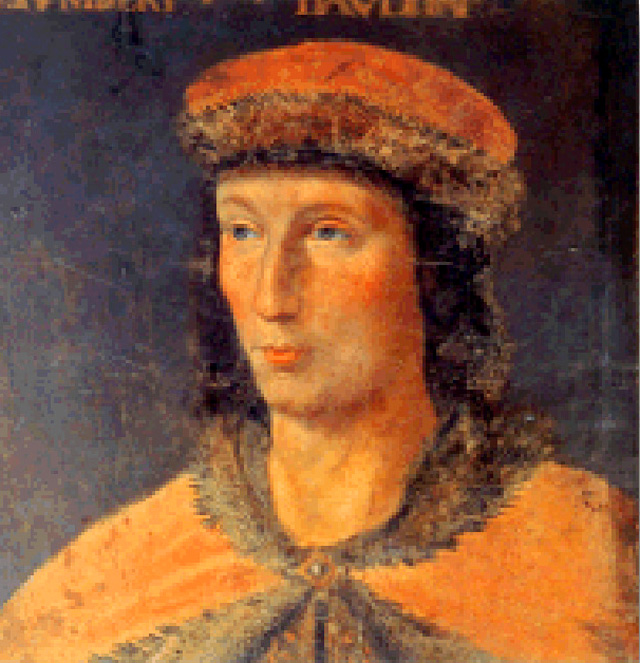
Humbert II de la Tour-du-Pin

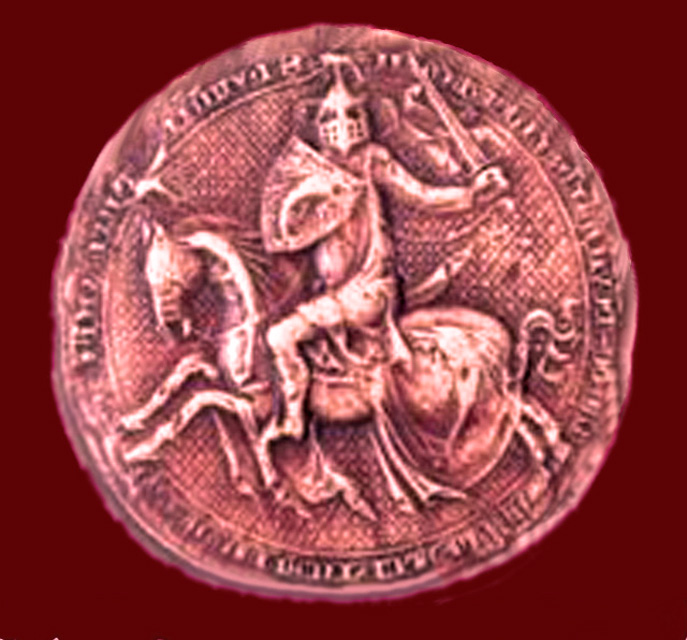
Humbert II's great seal

Humbert II de la Tour-du-Pin (1312 – 4 May 1355) was the Dauphin de Viennois, from 1333 to 1349. His feudal domains, known as the Dauphiné, belonged to the Kingdom of Burgundy (Arles), under the suzerainty of the Holy Roman Empire. Humbert was the last dauphin from the local line of Counts of Albon and Dauphins of Viennois, and being childless, he decided to sell his domains to the House of Valois in 1349, relinquishing his lands and titles on 16 July to the young French prince Charles, and dedicating the rest of his life to an ecclesiastical career.

== Character ==
Humbert was a son of dauphin John II of Viennois and Beatrice of Hungary. To contemporaries, he was incompetent and extravagant, lacking the warlike ardour of his brother. He passed his youth at Naples enjoying the aesthetic pleasures of the Italian trecento. His subsequent court at Beauvoir-en-Royans had a reputation for extravagance. Unlike his predecessors, Humbert was not itinerant, moving continually from one dauphinal castle to another, instead preferring to settle in Beauvoir. He depleted his treasury rather than institute oppressive taxes.

== War and politics ==
When Humbert inherited the Dauphiné on the death of his brother Guigues VIII in 1333, they were at war with Aymon, Count of Savoy. Within a year, King Philip VI of France was able to broker a truce between the new dauphin and Savoy. In 1333, Louis IV, Holy Roman Emperor, sought to counter French influence in the region, and offered Humbert the Kingdom of Arles, an opportunity to gain full authority over Savoy, Provence, and surrounding territories. Humbert was reluctant to take the crown and the conflict that would follow with all around him, so he declined. Subsequently, Humbert found himself more and more financially dependent on Philip.

Humbert was married to Marie of Baux, niece of King Robert of Naples by his sister Beatrice. Humbert's only son, Andrew, died aged two in October 1335. By 1337 Humbert was planning to cede his inheritance. He first offered it to Robert, who did not like the terms. In 1339 due to increasing financial difficulties, he made an inventory of his possessions with the hope of selling them to Pope Benedict XII, but the plan fell through.

In 1343, a series of complex negotiations was initiated between Humbert and the French king Philip VI, regarding the future inheritance of the Dauphiné. Since Humbert remained childless, it was initially agreed that in exchange for a substantial financial compensation and an annual pension, his domains will pass to king's younger son Philip, Duke of Orléans. Already in 1344, those provisions were changed by the new arrangement, designating king's oldest son John, Duke of Normandy as Humbert's heir in the Dauphiné.

In May 1345, Humbert left Marseille leading a papal fleet called by Pope Clement VI. The Second Smyrniote Crusade was against the Aydınids. It was intended to assist the recaptured Christian port of Smyrna by responding to a January 1345 attack during a time of truce by the Turkish garrison upon Christians worshipping in the demolished cathedral. While at sail his fleet was attacked by the Genoese near Rhodes. He was also asked to intervene by Venice in the conflict between Bartolomeo Zaccaria and Guglielma Pallavicini over the marquisate of Bodonitsa. Humbert's battle for control of Smyrna in 1346 led to 56 years of Christian rule over the city until its capture by Timur in 1402. During his command, he established the confraternal Order of Saint Catherine.

Humbert's wife died around the start of 1347, shortly before he returned from the crusade. As he was returning, he joined marquesses John II of Montferrat and Thomas II of Saluzzo in their fight against Robert's successor, Queen Joanna I of Naples, who was supported by the Savoyards. When Pope Clement VI brought the two sides to negotiations, the terms included the possibility of Humbert marrying Bianca of Savoy, though this did not reach an agreement.

By 1349, Humbert decided to relinquish his rule over Dauphiné, and the final agreement was made with the French king, regarding the sale of Humbert's domains for 400,000 écus, and an annual pension. By the same agreement, king's grandson Charles was designated as Humbert's successor, on the condition that Dauphiné will remain a distinctive feudal polity, not integrated into the French realm. In order to emphasize those provisions, the sale was referred to as a "transfer". Thus in the summer of 1349, the young French prince Charles became the first Dauphin de Viennois from the House of Valois.

In order to prevent the title of dauphin from going into abeyance or being swallowed up in another sovereign title, right before the sale Humbert instituted the "Delphinal Statute" whereby the Dauphiné was exempted from many taxes and imposts. This statute was subject to much parliamentary debate at the regional level, as local leaders sought to defend their autonomy and privilege against the state.

== Marriage and descent ==
In July 1332, according to "De Allobrogibus libri novem", Humbert married Maria del Balzo, daughter of the Duke of Andria, Count of Montescaglioso, Bertrando III, and Beatrice of Anjou and niece of the sovereign of the Kingdom of Naples, Count of Anjou and of Maine, count of Provence and Forcalquier, and titular king of Jerusalem, Robert of Anjou, who according to document n° I of the Histoire de Dauphiné et des princes, granted an annual pension to Humbert, husband of his niece. Maria was remembered in Humbert's will drawn up in Rhodes and after her death, Pope Clement VI wrote a letter of condolence to Humbert. Humbert had only one son from his marriage with Maria del Balzo (French: Marie des Baux):

André (September 1333 – October 1335), who, in 1335, was betrothed to Blanche of Navarre.

== Ecclesiastical career ==
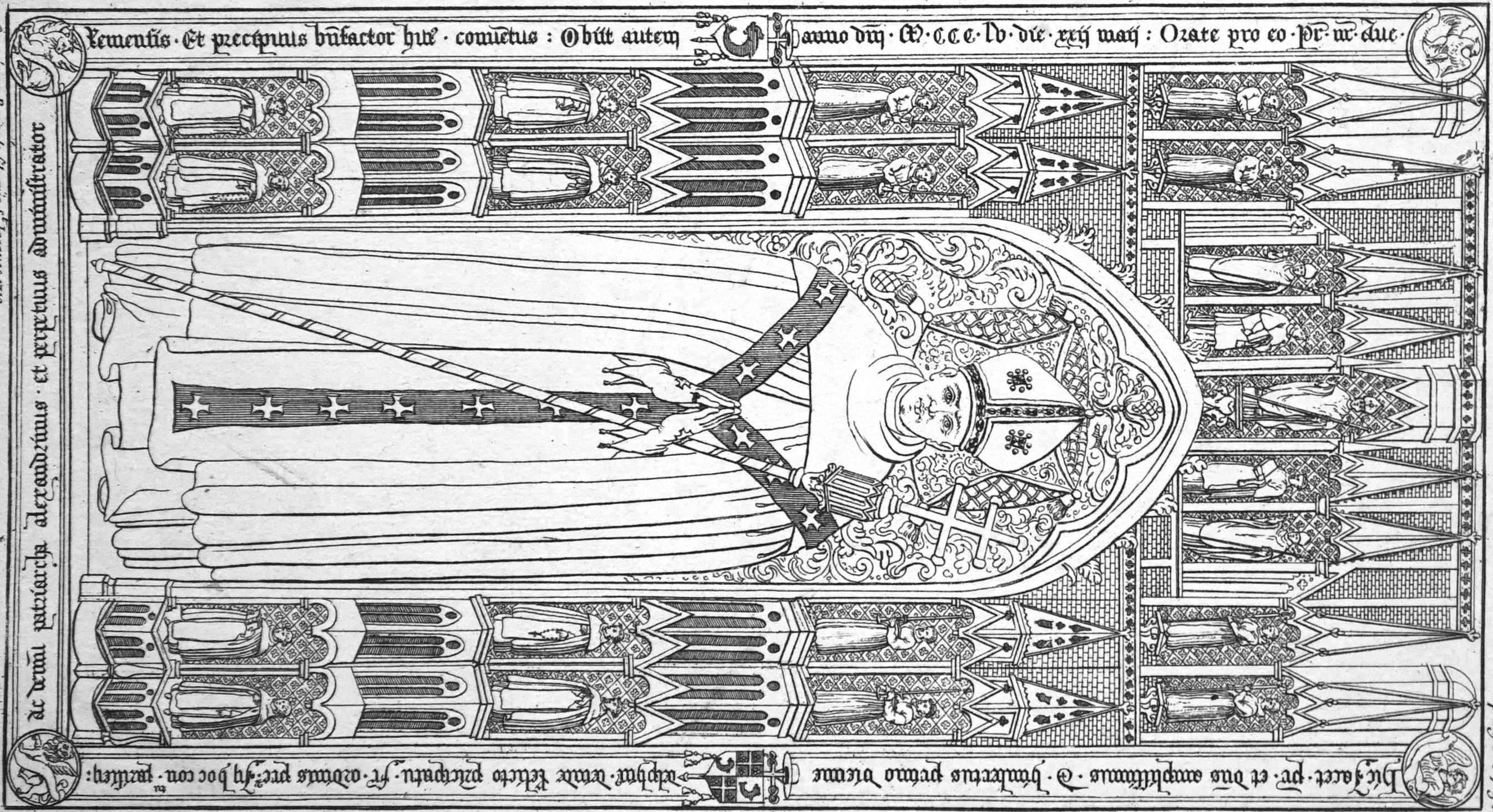
Humbert's tomb at Couvent des Jacobins de la rue Saint-Jacques

After ceding his lands, Humbert entered the Dominican Order and became Latin Patriarch of Alexandria within two years. He consecrated Rodolphe de Chissé as Bishop of Grenoble in 1351. It is with these latter titles that his death is recorded in a necrology of Vauvert: in Clermont-en-Auvergne, at 43 years of age in 1355. He was buried in the now demolished church of Couvent des Jacobins in Paris.

== Sources ==
- Cheney, C. R. (Apr 1935). "The Diocese of Grenoble in the Fourteenth Century". Speculum. 10 (2). doi:10.2307/2849463. JSTOR 2849463. S2CID 162193944.
- Cox, Eugene L. (1967). The Green Count of Savoy. Princeton, New Jersey: Princeton University Press. LCCN 67-11030.
- Guiffrey, Jules (1868). Histoire de la réunion du Dauphiné à la France. Paris: Académie des bibliophiles.
- Georgiou, Constantinos (2017). "Ordinavi armatam sancte unionis: Clement VI's Sermon on the Dauphin Humbert II of Viennois's Leadership of the Christian Armada against the Turks, 1345". In Kedar, Benjamin Z.; Phillips, Jonathan; Riley-Smith, Jonathan; Chrissis, Nikolaos G. (eds.). Crusades. Vol. 15. Routledge.
- Kibler, William W.; Zinn, Grover A., eds. (2011) [1995]. Medieval France: An Encyclopedia. New York and London: Routledge.
- Setton, Kenneth M. (1976). The Papacy and the Levant (1204–1571), Volume I: The Thirteenth and Fourteenth Centuries. Philadelphia: The American Philosophical Society. ISBN 0-87169-114-0.
