= Assassination of Gertrude of Merania =

1213 murder of the queen of Hungary

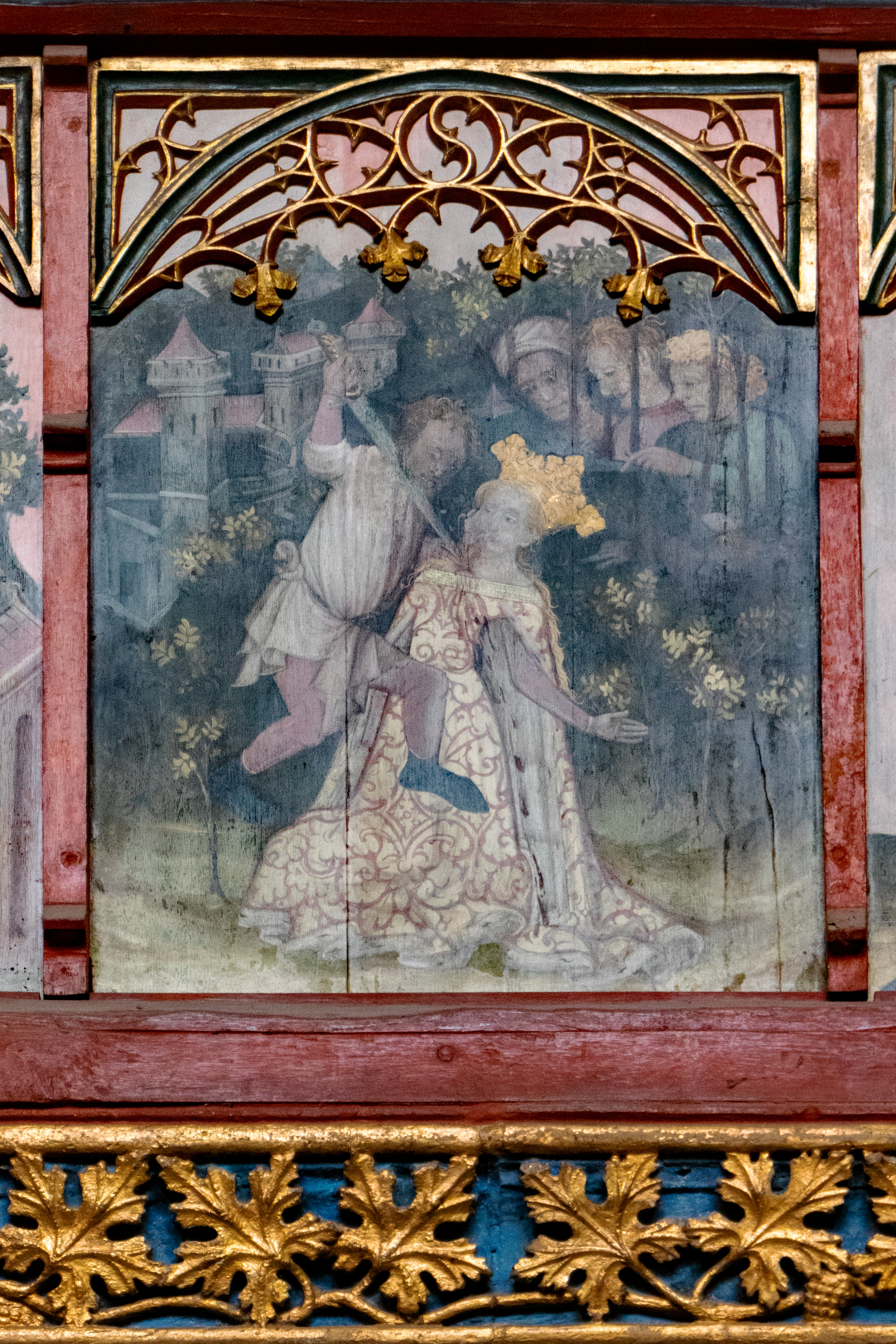
- Murder of Gertrude, depicted the 9th painting of Life of St. Elisabeth of Hungary cycle in Heiligen-Geist-Hospital, Lübeck (15th century)
- Location: Pilis Mountains, Kingdom of Hungary
- Date: 28 September 1213
- Target: Queen Gertrude of Merania
- Attack type: Assassination by stabbing
- Perpetrator: group of Hungarian lords led by Peter, son of Töre
- Motive: Possible grudge against German (Meranian) influence or personal motives against Gertrude

Gertrude of Merania, the queen consort of Hungary as the first wife of King Andrew II (r. 1205–1235), was assassinated by a group of Hungarian lords on 28 September 1213 in the Pilis Mountains during a royal hunting expedition. Leopold VI, Duke of Austria and Gertrude's brother Berthold, Archbishop of Kalocsa were also wounded but survived the attack.

The assassination became one of the most high-profile criminal cases in the history of Hungary, and caused widespread astonishment across Europe in the 13th century. Despite a relatively diverse and large number of domestic and foreign sources, the motivation of the killers is unclear. According to contemporary sources, Gertrude's blatant favoritism towards her German kinsmen and courtiers had stirred up discontent among the native lords and prompted her murder. Later tradition says that Gertrude's brother Berthold raped the wife of Bánk Bár-Kalán, one of the lords, who, along with his companions, took revenge for the grievance. This story inspired many subsequent chroniclers and literary works in Hungary and the rest of Europe.

== Background ==
Gertrude was born into the House of Andechs as the daughter of Berthold, Duke of Merania. The Duchy of Merania, a fiefdom of the Holy Roman Empire, laid in the peninsula of Istria and also had nominal suzerainty over the coast of the Adriatic Sea. Merania was located in the neighborhood of Dalmatia, belonging to Croatia in personal union with Hungary, which was ruled by Emeric from 1196 to 1204. His younger brother Andrew constantly rebelled against him. Following a victory against the king, he forced Emeric to cede Croatia and Dalmatia as an appanage to him in 1197. In practice, Andrew administered the provinces as an independent monarch. Although Emeric defeated his brother after another conspiracy in 1199, Andrew was allowed to return to his duchy in 1200. Andrew married Gertrude of Merania sometime between 1200 and 1203; Gertrude's father Berthold owned extensive domains in the Holy Roman Empire along the borders of Andrew's duchy. Gertrude's influence and political involvement, already in the years before Andrew's reign as king, are clearly shown by the fact that when Emeric defeated his brother again in 1203, he found it necessary to send Gertrude back to her native land of Merania.

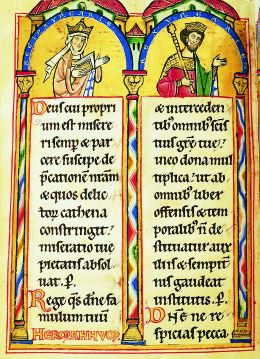
Contemporary depiction of Queen Gertrude and King Andrew II, Landgrafenpsalter, Thuringia, c. 1213

Andrew II ascended to the Hungarian throne in 1205. As queen consort, Gertrude had unusual (but not unprecedented; see Helena of Serbia) influence over governmental affairs. Theodoric of Apolda, in his hagiography of Elizabeth of Hungary, emphasizes Gertrude's "masculine characteristics". Two sources testify that Gertrude exercised power as regent during the king's absence on military campaigns. When Andrew II launched a campaign against the Cuman chieftain Gubasel in Bulgaria, Gertrude performed a judicial activity over a lawsuit between Abbot Uros of Pannonhalma and the castle serfs of Pressburg (present-day Bratislava, Slovakia) around 1212 or 1213. Another note mentions that when Gertrude was assassinated, the royal seal was lost. Both remarks imply that Gertrude acted as royal governor both times when Andrew led campaigns in Bulgaria and Halych, respectively, which caused resentment among the local elite.

Gertrude also expressed blatant favoritism towards her German kinsmen and courtiers, which may have stirred up discontent among the native Hungarian lords. Her younger brother Berthold was appointed Archbishop of Kalocsa in 1206 and was made Ban of Croatia and Dalmatia in 1209. Two other brothers, Ekbert, Bishop of Bamberg, and Henry II, Margrave of Istria, fled to Hungary in 1208 after they were accused of participating in the murder of Philip, King of the Germans. Andrew granted large domains to Ekbert in the Szepesség region (now Spiš, Slovakia). Andrew's generosity towards his wife's German relatives and courtiers added to the discontent of the local lords. According to historian Gyula Kristó, the anonymous author of The Deeds of the Hungarians referred to the Germans from the Holy Roman Empire when he sarcastically mentioned that "now ... the Romans graze on the goods of Hungary." However, there is no source suggesting that Gertrude ever appointed German courtiers in her queenly court. Although it is possible that the 26th article of the Golden Bull of 1222, which prescribed that Hungarian properties could not be given to foreigners, and the 23rd article of the Golden Bull of 1231, which prescribed that foreigners could only be appointed to court positions if they remained in Hungary (because such people only "take the country's wealth [abroad]"), may reflect a negative response to Gertrude's favoritism, the few surviving royal donation letters from the period do not prove the mass acquisition of land by the Germans either; the local provost Adolph was granted lands in Szepesség due to the intervention of Gertrude and his brothers in 1209, while a certain Lenguer was granted a small portion in the village of Szántó upon the request of Archbishop Berthold. Both donations are considered insignificant gains compared to other acquisitions of the period, the beneficiaries of which were members of the native Hungarian elite. Officials of the queen's court (for instance, its count or head), including the future assassin Peter, were in all cases Hungarian magnates.

== Assassination ==
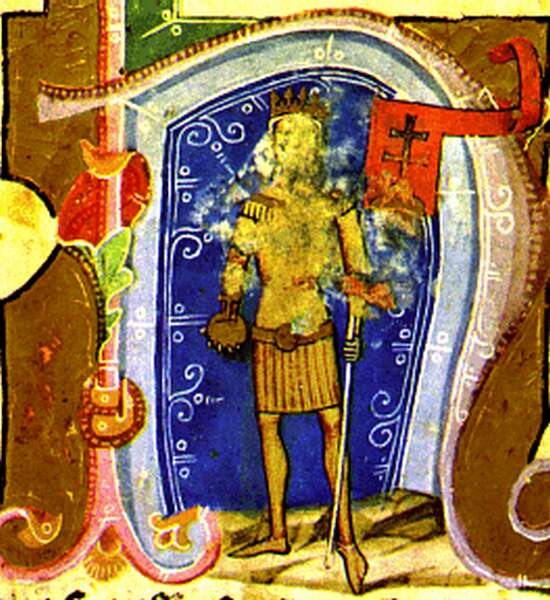
Andrew II depicted in Illuminated Chronicle

In order to support his protege Danylo Romanovich against Mstislav Mstislavich, Andrew II departed for a new royal campaign against the Principality of Halych in the summer of 1213. During his absence, Hungarian lords captured and murdered Gertrude and many of her courtiers. Late 19th-century Hungarian historian Gyula Pauler was the first scholar, who compiled a professional synthesis, as well as a detailed examination of the circumstances of the murder, based on comprehensive source research and considering the conditions of the era. His findings were unanimously accepted by Hungarian historiography in the following decades.

According to Pauler, Queen Gertrude and her escort, also attending by his brother Archbishop Berthold and the reigning Austrian duke Leopold VI, took part in hunting in the Pilis Hills in late September 1213, when a group of Hungarian lords stormed the queen's tent and assassinated her partly for political reasons, partly because of personal grievances. Among the perpetrators were the queen's former confidant Peter, son of Töre, brothers Simon Kacsics and Michael Kacsics and a certain Simon, son-in-law of Palatine Bánk Bár-Kalán. It is possible, as Pauler considered, that the palatine himself and John, Archbishop of Esztergom were also involved in the planning of the conspiracy, but they remained in the background at the time of the assassination. Gertrude was brutally slaughtered, while Berthold and Leopold were physically assaulted, but they were released subsequently and managed to flee the scene. Based on new sources and philological considerations, historian Tamás Körmendi reexamined the circumstances of the assassination in his 2014 study.

=== Date and location ===
Regarding the year, the contemporary and near-contemporary sources place the assassination in many different years, within a wide range between 1200 and 1218. However, Gertrude was firmly alive in 1211, when she sent her daughter Elizabeth with a substantial dowry to the Landgraviate of Thuringia in that year. On the other hand, her widower Andrew II mourned her death in his two surviving royal charters issued in 1214. Most of the narrative sources put the date of the murder to the year 1213. Tamás Körmendi accepted this year, since the majority of these works are the earliest and seemingly most authentic chronicles, including the Annals of Göttweig (Annales Gotwicenses) and the Annals of Salzburg (Annales Salisburgenses). 1213 is the only year, which appears in works that cannot be compared or related philologically, which makes it beyond doubt that the murder took place at that time.

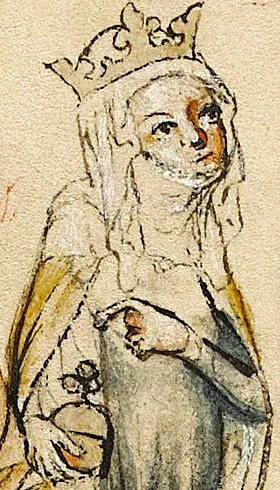
Queen Gertrude of Merania, as depicted in mid-14th century Hedwig Codex

Only three sources mentions the proper date of the murder. A 15th-century section of a Bavarian source, the Founders of the Monastery of Diessen (De fundatoribus monasterii Diessenses) refers the date to 28 September but with the year 1200, and cannot be considered an authentic report. The Annals of the Dominicans of Vienna (Annales Praedicatorum Vindobonensium) from the late 13th century preserved the exact date of assassination, 28 September, but without adding the year. Historian László Veszprémy accepted the date as authentic, since the annals also used necrologies as source, which always focused on the specific month and day instead of the year. The Aschaffenburgi Psalterium, which was compiled for Gertrude of Aldenberg, the queen's granddaughter, lists the time of death of various members of the House of Andechs; accordingly Queen Gertrude died on 28 September (the year is not given). The three unrelated sources confirm that the assassination did indeed take place on 28 September 1213.

Based on the narrations of the Austrian Rhyming Chronicle (Chronicon rhytmicum Austriacum) and the aforementioned Annals of the Dominicans of Vienna, which write that Gertrude was killed in her "field tent", and the fact that the queen was buried in the Pilis Abbey thereafter, Gyula Pauler claimed the assassination took place in the nearby Pilis royal forest on the occasion of a royal hunting. The subsequent Hungarian historiography accepted the theory without any reservations. Tamás Körmendi emphasized the speculative nature of this data; he emphasized, other sources say that the queen was assassinated either in her palace, bedroom or the royal military camp. The Galician–Volhynian Chronicle writes that Gertrude was murdered in the Premonstratensian monastery of Lelesz (present-day Leles, Slovakia), while accompanying her husband into the royal campaign against Halych. A royal charter from 1214 refers to that "a certain part of her [Gertrude's] body" was buried in Lelesz. Pauler argued Andrew II on his way to Halych was caught at Lelesz by the messenger who brought the news of her death, who presented a piece of the queen's corpse as evidence, which was subsequently buried there. In contrast, Körmendi considered the non-transportable pieces of the mutilated queen were quickly buried in the Lelesz monastery, near which the assassination could have taken place, perhaps in the Patak royal forest along the river Bodrog.

=== Perpetrators ===
Peter, son of Töre, a former confidant of Gertrude, was the only sure participant in the assassination. One of the earliest records, the all three manuscripts of the Annals of Salzburg (its main corpus was written before 1216) contain that element which say the "queen of the Hungarians [...] was slaughtered by a certain count Peter". When Béla IV (the eldest son of Andrew and Gertrude) donated Peter's former lands to the newly founded the Cistercian Bélakút Abbey, the king states that these estates were confiscated from Peter, who "committed the crime of high treason by murdering our mother".

Subsequent Hungarian royal charters also refer to brothers Simon and Michael Kacsics as leading instigators of Gertrude's assassination. When Duke Béla, gaining power over the royal council, started reclaiming King Andrew's land grants throughout Hungary, he forced his father to confiscate the estates of those noblemen who had plotted against his mother one and a half decade earlier. Accordingly, Simon Kacsics lost his lands and villages in Transylvania and Nógrád County which were granted by Denis Tomaj and his clan. In his charter, Andrew II referred to Simon's active participation in the murder of his consort. Accordingly, Simon "by a new and unheard-of kind of wickedness and vileness, cruelly and horribly armed for hateful machinations, conspiring with his accomplices: bloodthirsty and treacherous men, to the shame and dishonor of our royal crown, was involved in the death of the well-remembered Queen Gertrude, our dearest consort". The land confiscation in 1228 might be a sign of the subsequent retaliation after an increased role in national politics by princes Béla and Coloman since the early 1220s, as historian Gyula Pauler argued. Körmendi argued, it is quite unrealistic that Andrew II appointed Simon to baronial dignities after the murder, even his few opportunities for punish the perpetrators, as Pauler had claimed. Accordingly, Simon was not considered among the assassins of Gertrude immediately after the murder. As Simon was mentioned as armed participant in the act, it is presumable that he became a victim of power intrigues and accused of conspiracy purely out of political reasons. Simon's brother, Michael Kacsics is also listed among the perpetrators by a royal charter of Ladislaus IV from 1277, when returned the lands to the sons of the aforementioned Denis Tomaj from Michael's descendants. Croatian historian Antun Nekić argued the assassination was not directed against the person or policies of King Andrew II, but was a result of Gertrude's "own actions", therefore, everyone except the actual assassin (Peter) received only a light punishment. Thus, Nekić accepted Pauler's argument in relation to the delayed retaliation.

Two royal charters of Béla IV narrate that Bánk Bár-Kalán had participated in the assassination. In 1240, Béla IV donated Bánk's former lands, which he had lost for "his sin of high treason", since "he conspired to murder our dearest mother [Gertrude] — he lost all his possessions, not exactly unjustly, for he would have deserved more severe revenge by the judgment that common sense had brought upon him". When Béla granted another landholdings in 1262, the king noted too that those estates escheated to the crown from "our disloyal, Ban Bánk". The fact that Bánk held court positions even after the assassination questions the authenticity of the above accounts, or at least his leading role in the conspiracy. Historian Gyula Pauler considered Bánk managed to survive the subsequent retaliation, because Andrew II was not strong enough to punish one of the most powerful barons, while the main assassin Peter, son of Töre was executed. According to János Karácsonyi, Bánk supported the conspiracy, but he did not mastermind the crime. Historian Erik Fügedi argued Bánk was the most prestigious member of the conspiracy, which in the following decades magnified his role and thus became the executor and chief of the assassination in the later narratives. Tamás Körmendi emphasized the late 19th-century historiography incorrectly considered Andrew II as a weak ruler. Körmendi argued Bánk was accused of involvement in the assassination sometime only between 1222 and 1240. Along with other charged barons – Simon Kacsics, Michael Kacsics and Bánk's son-in-law Simon – it is presumable that Bánk became a victim of power intrigues and political purge, and accused of conspiracy purely out of political reasons, while Peter, son of Töre indeed assassinated the queen. In contrast, Antun Nekić argued that since all the 1213 charters where Bánk is listed as an official do not include the exact date, it is possible that they were all issued before the assassination, i.e. these losses of position could have been the motivation for the murder.

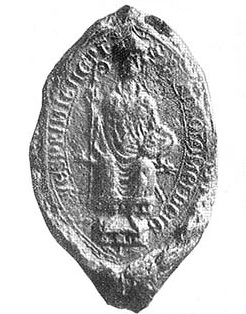
Seal of John, Archbishop of Esztergom. Some sources claim he was involved in the conspiracy which led to Gertrude's assassination

According to a royal charter of Duke Stephen from 1270, the lands of Bánk's son-in-law, a certain Simon in Bereg and Szabolcs counties were also confiscated prior to that. Early historiography identified Bánk's son-in-law with Simon Kacsics, however, as historian Gyula Pauler proved, while Simon Kacsics had descendants (his last known offspring was still alive in 1299), Bánk's son-in-law, Simon died without issue prior to 1270. Pauler considered Simon was among the killers, and his involvement caused his father-in-law's political downfall years later. Veszprémy argued there is no record of Simon's active involvement in the murder, according to the unclear term of the medieval legal system. Körmendi emphasized Simon's lands escheated to the crown because of his death without issue and not for his alleged involvement in the assassination.

The participation of John, Archbishop of Esztergom in the conspiracy also arose. His involvement is mentioned by Italian scholar Boncompagno da Signa's tractate Rhetorica novissima, Alberic of Trois-Fontaines' Chronica and Matthew of Paris' Chronica Majora and Historia Anglorum. These works unanimously note John's famous phrase in his letter to Hungarian nobles planning the assassination of Gertrude: "Reginam occidere nolite timere bonum est si omnes consentiunt ego non contradico", can be roughly translated into "Kill Queen you must not fear will be good if all agree I do not oppose". The meaning is highly dependent on punctuation: either the speaker wishes a queen killed ("Kill Queen, you must not fear, will be good if all agree, I do not oppose") or not ("Kill Queen you must not, fear will be good, if all agree I do not, oppose"). László Veszprémy considered the anecdote first appeared in the Annals of Salzburg after an oral spread among the lower clergymen. On the other hand, Tamás Körmendi argued the ambiguous letter was subscribed as a result of a subsequent insertion. It is possible that Boncompagno heard the story in the Roman Curia and incorporated it into his rhetoric dissertation and textbook (published in 1235, the first written source of John's alleged letter). Both Boncompagno and Alberic mention that Andrew accused John of participating in the murder before the Holy See. However Pope Innocent III, pointing out the correct use of commas, acquitted the archbishop from the charges. These references emphasize the letter's unintended ambiguity and, thus, John's approval of murder. Körmendi emphasized the historiographical doubts regarding the authenticity of the letter, as John retained his influence in the upcoming years after the assassination. The historian also argued the preservation of the letter would have been irrational step, moreover the majority of the Hungarian nobility were illiterate during that time.

Croatian historian Antun Nekić considered that Marcellus Tétény might also have been part of the conspiracy against Gertrude. He was deprived of his offices in 1212, thus he could join next year to the group of dissatisfied noblemen. Neither Marcellus nor his brothers held any important position until the late 1220s, and Béla's accession to the throne adversely affected them after 1235.

=== Witnesses ===
The various sources mention only four people who were present as eyewitnesses during the assassination, but due to the differing credibility of the sources, it is certain that not all of them were actually present. A group of works (see below) marks Archbishop Berthold, Gertrude's brother as a key figure in the case. However, only the Galician–Volhynian Chronicle states that Berthold was present during the assassination. Despite the doubtful authenticity of the chronicle's report, historian Tamás Körmendi accepted the information on Berthold's presence, since a letter of Pope Innocent III to Archbishop John of Esztergom in January 1214 refers to the physical assault on Berthold. According to the pope's letter, during the rebellion many clergy and monks in the Archdiocese of Kalocsa suffered physical insult and material damage. Innocent instructed John to excommunicate the perpetrators. In addition, the pope also sent a letter to the "dukes of Poland" not to give any refuge to the perpetrators who might flee abroad.

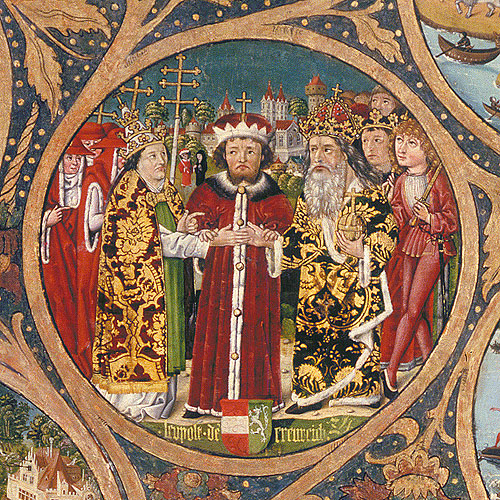
Leopold VI, Duke of Austria, who was present during the assassination, and narrowly survived

The Annals of Admont (Annales Admontenses) and the 15th-century historian Thomas Ebendorfer's Austrian Chronicle (Chronicon Austriae) mention the presence of the Austrian duke Leopold VI too. Despite relevant factual errors (e.g. the date), Tamás Körmendi accepted the information of the mid-13th-century annals, since the work provides a very detailed and authentic account of the activities of the Austrian dukes. Accordingly, Leopold arrived to Hungary after his return from Calatrava la Vieja during the Albigensian Crusade. The Annals of Admont claims that the assassins intended to kill Leopold too, but Körmendi refused this, considering the monks of the Admont Abbey (its right of patronage was possessed by the duke) sought to increase the importance of Leopold.

The continuation of the Royal Chronicle of Cologne (Chronica regia Coloniensis) and three other works – Annals of Admont, Rainer of Liège's annals and the Galician–Volhynian Chronicle –, which used its text, claim that Andrew II was present during the assassination of his wife, the Galician–Volhynian Chronicle even states that the real target was actually the king. In contrast, the Annals of Salzburg and four derivative texts refer to the fact that the assassination took place when Andrew II led a campaign into Halych. Körmendi emphasized there is no sign of a nationwide rebellion against the king in 1213 and the subsequent royal charters do not mention that the conspirators attempted to murder Andrew himself. Andrew refers to conspiracies against him in 1209–1210 and 1214 too, but not in 1213.

A single source, the Chronicle of the Anonymus of Leoben (Chronicon Leobiense) claims that Gertrude's other brother, Ekbert was the one who forced the wife of a Hungarian lord to commit adultery, which resulted the assassination. The chronicle says Ekbert was present during the crime. It is plausible that the anonymous author confused Ekbert with Berthold. Although Ekbert resided in Hungary for a while, but departed for Austria long before the assassination.

=== Motivations ===
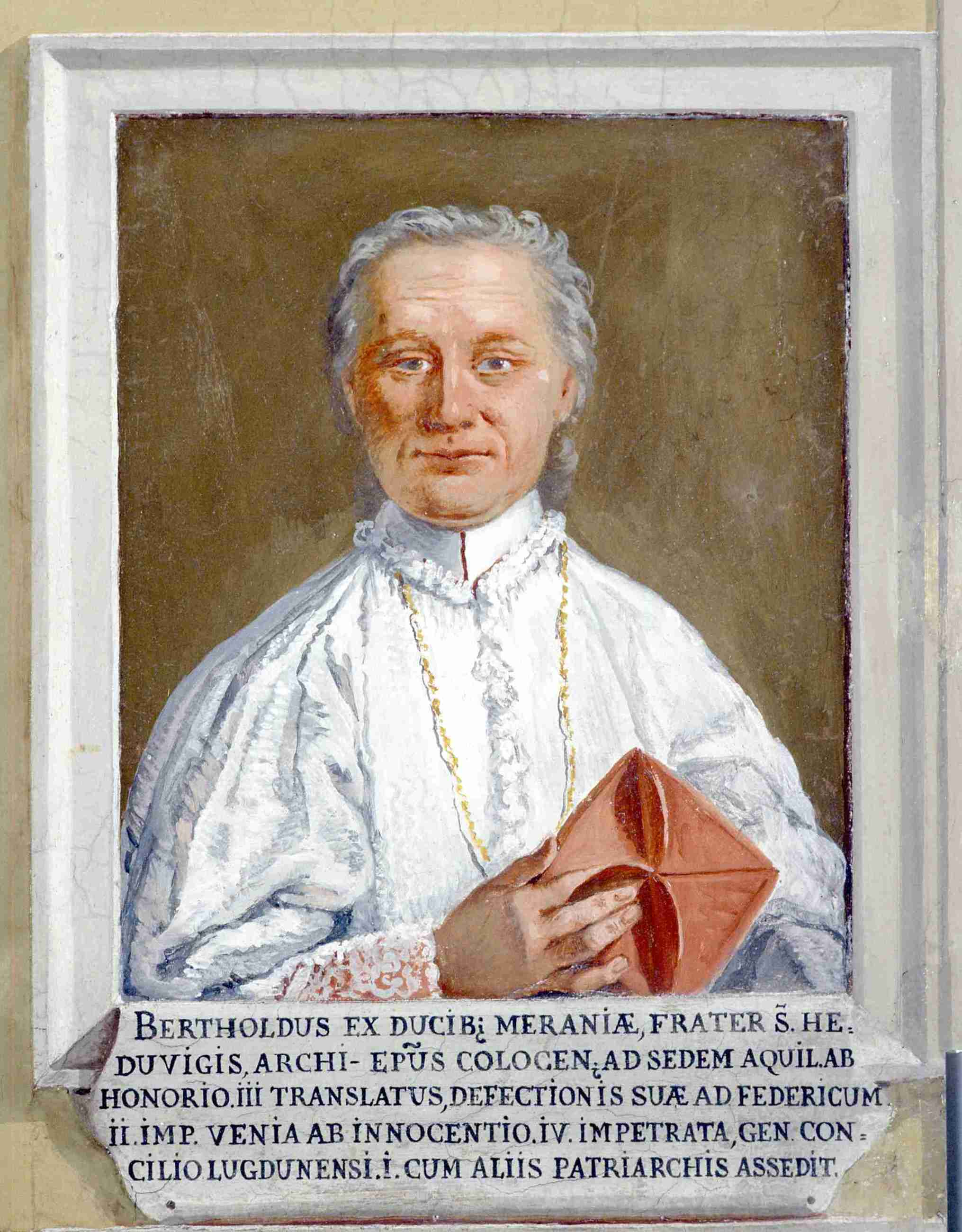
Portrait of Berthold, Patriarch of Aquileia. A group of sources claim that Berthold (then Archbishop of Kalocsa) raped or committed adultery with a wife of Bánk Bár-Kalán, which was the immediate factor to the murder of his sister Gertrude.

With the beginning of the narration of the Annals of Göttweig, several contemporary and near-contemporary works mark the queen's pro-German attitude as a motive for her assassination. A side note from the Hungarian chronicler Anonymus (see above) strengthens this standpoint. However, as mentioned in the background section, there is no trace of the beneficiary status of the Germans in the sources and royal donations of the time. In contrast, Antun Nekić argued that, due to the incomplete dates of the charters, it cannot be ruled out that the participants in the assassination – mainly, Peter and Bánk – actually lost their offices in the royal court one after another during the year 1213.

The Austrian Rhyming Chronicle is the earliest known work, which preserved the alleged story of that Archbishop Berthold raped Bánk Bár-Kalán's wife, which was the immediate cause of the assassination of the queen, who acted as a procuress in the adultery. According to this narration, Bánk led the conspirators and stabbed Gertrude with a sword personally. The chronicle was compiled by a Hungarian cleric in Klosterneuburg Abbey, Lower Austria around 1270. The chronicle claims that Béla IV ordered to slaughter all participants of the assassination, after he ascended the Hungarian throne in 1235. Its text was utilized by the Annals of the Dominicans of Vienna at the end of the 13th century. In addition, the annals used other source too, since, unlike the Austrian Rhyming Chronicle, it mentions Bánk's alleged German name ("Prenger") and the exact date of the assassination. The 14th-century Illuminated Chronicle (Chronicon Pictum) took over the story too, which then made a decisive contribution to making the story rooted in the Hungarian chronicle and historiographical tradition and, subsequently, the Hungarian-language literature and culture. Other works, which spread this narration too, emphasize the innocence of Gertrude regarding the adultery between Berthold and Bánk's wife.

The Annals of Admont, the Royal Chronicle of Cologne, Rainer of Liége's annals and the Galician–Volhynian Chronicle claim the real target of the assassination was King Andrew II himself. Historian Bálint Hóman assumed the conspirators attempted to oust Andrew from power in order to replace him with his heir, the seven-year-old Béla. However, since Andrew led a campaign to Halych during the assassination, killing the queen certainly would not have caused his downfall. Gertrude's active role in the government as a queen was an unusual phenomenon in Hungary, which could be opposed by a group of barons. Tamás Körmendi does not reject the possibility of personal revenge as a motivation for the assassination. It is possible that Peter, who was considered still the queen's confidant in early 1213, became involved in an undefined personal conflict with Queen Gertrude, but its nature, due to lack of resources, remained obscure.

== Aftermath ==
When Andrew II heard the news of his wife's murder, he interrupted the campaign in Halych and returned home. He ordered the execution of the murderer, Peter, son of Töre, who was impaled "along with others" in the autumn of 1213, according to the Annals of Marbach (Annales Marbacenses). The Annals of Salzburg says that Peter and others were beheaded the night after the assassination. The continuation of Magnus von Reichersberg's chronicle narrates that Peter was executed along with his wife and entire family the day after the assassination. The Anonymus of Leoben narrates that Peter's lands were also confiscated and Béla IV, now as king, donated Peter's former lands – including the eponymous Pétervárad ("Peter's Castle", present-day Petrovaradin, part of the agglomeration of Novi Sad, Serbia) – to the newly founded Cistercian Bélakút Abbey, which belonged to the Archdiocese of Kalocsa. A royal charter from 1237 confirms this narrative.

According to a mainstream view of Hungarian historiography, Peter's accomplices, including Palatine Bánk, did not receive severe punishments, due to the current political situation and Andrew's power instability. Only Duke Béla, son of Andrew and Gertrude took revenge after he was appointed Duke of Transylvania and started to revise his father's policy. In 1228, he confiscated the estates of Bánk and the Kacsics brothers, who had plotted against his mother. Tamás Körmendi believed that they were all victims of power intrigues and political purge, and accused of conspiracy purely out of political reasons.

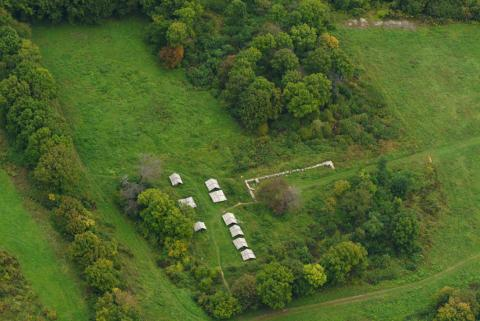
The ruins of Pilis Abbey, the burial place of Queen Gertrude

In accordance with her will, Gertrude was buried in the Pilis Abbey, while certain parts of her body were buried in the monastery of Lelesz. Andrew II ordered that two priests of the monastery pray for his wife's spiritual salvation. The ruins of her tomb were discovered during the excavations carried out by László Gerevich in the Pilis Abbey between 1967 and 1982. Art historian Imre Takács considered the French Gothic style of Gertrude's tomb to be similar to the drawings of Villard de Honnecourt, who spent a considerable time in Hungary in those years, but Takács did not attribute the sculptures to him. It is possible that one of the excavated skeletons (that of a 30-40 year old woman) is Gertrude's remains.

Shortly after the Gertrude's assassination, Andrew II married Yolanda of Courtenay in February 1215. The king did not intend for the new wife to have a governmental role, experiencing the previous sharp opposition from the Hungarian elite. When Andrew left Hungary to fight in the Fifth Crusade in 1217–1218, he entrusted the regency to Archbishop John and Palatine Julius Kán, instead of to Yolanda, who remained passive in political matters throughout her life. Andrew's third wife Beatrice d'Este had a similar concept of role. According to Gyula Kristó, Gertrude's unpopular pro-German attitude negatively affected the portrayal of Blessed Gisela, the consort of the first Hungarian king Saint Stephen I (r. 1000–1038) in the contemporary Hungarian chronicles, which in fact described Gertrude's activity. The Illuminated Chronicle says that Gisela "determined to appoint as king the queen's brother, Peter the German or rather Venetian, with the intention that Queen Gisela might then according to her desire fulfill all the impulses of her will, and that the kingdom of Hungary might lose its liberty and be subjected without hindrance to the dominion of the Germans". In fact, Gisela had tense relationship with Stephen's nephew and successor Peter, the son of the Venetian doge Otto Orseolo. To avoid persecution, the contemporary chronicles narrated Gertrude's assumed pro-German influence inserted between the events of the 11th century. The death of Gertrude and the "negative experiences" associated with her resulted the decline of a separate queenly court with own courtiers and partisans in the 13th-century Hungary. Even the 1298 laws prescribed that only Hungarian-born barons can hold positions and offices in the queen's court.

== Sources ==
Beside the 14th-century Illuminated Chronicle and six royal charters, approximately 60 medieval external sources – before the era of Renaissance – refer to the assassination of Queen Gertrude. Among them, only 28 sources contain more information and details beyond the fact of the murder. While Flórián Mátyás was the first scholar, who collected the narrations in the early 20th century, historians László Veszprémy then Tamás Körmendi organized the sources according to content, determining the philological relationship between them and the time of their origin.

=== Group A – Pro-German attitude ===
This group contains those narrations which mark Gertrude's favoritism towards her German or Meranian courtiers as the cause of her assassination. These are the earliest sources on the murder, the texts were created within a few years in the territory of the Holy Roman Empire.

1. Annals of Göttweig (Annales Gotwicenses): the earliest foreign record of the assassination, this section written in the Benedictine Göttweig Abbey in Lower Austria, around the same time as the assassination. Accordingly, the magnates of Hungary, "uniting their armed and violent hands", murdered Gertrude because of their "hatred towards Germans".
2. Annals of Marbach (Annales Marbacenses): written in the Augustinian Marbach Abbey in Alsace around 1230. Körmendi considered the friars were informed through Cistercians from Hungary via the monks of Neuburg Abbey. The annals write that Gertrude was assassinated because of her "largesse and generosity" towards her German entourage. It narrates that one of the murderers, ispán Peter was impaled "through his belly" by Andrew II. Unidentified others were also captured and executed with different penalties. Körmendi argued this note is one of the most reliable and trustable written sources of the murder.
3. Annals of Admont (Annales Admontenses): its first continuation (in the period 1140–1257) contains unique elements on the assassination. Accordingly, Gertrude was murdered because of the Hungarians' "hatred towards Germans" in the presence of King Andrew II. The text also emphasizes that Duke Leopold was present during the assassination. It incorrectly put the date of the crime to the end of the year 1211. Regarding the assassination, the text may have been revised and rewritten at least once.
4. Royal Chronicle of Cologne (Chronica regia Coloniensis): The text, its continuation (written from 1202 to 1220), places the date of the murder to the year 1210. It contains a multi-distorted narration; Andrew was unable to capture a fort with his army. Upon Gertrude's advice, he hired German knights from her entourage, who successfully besieged this fort. The Germans were granted many gifts and positions. The jealous Hungarians intended to assassinate Andrew II, but Gertrude warned her husband. Andrew and his men left the camp, but Gertrude remained, and, thereafter, was brutally slaughtered with spears and stakes. Andrew captured all conspirators, along with their supporters, and ordered to execute them.
5. Rainer of Liége's annals (Annales Sancti Iacobi Leodiensis): the Benedictine author (1157 – after 1230), who continued the annals of the St. James Abbey in Liège, used the same source as the Royal Chronicle of Cologne regarding the assassination. According to the text, Andrew II, the real target, narrowly escaped from the palace, where Gertrude was assassinated.

=== Group B – Andrew's absence ===
Veszprémy listed those sources within the group, which refer to Peter, son of Töre as the assassin, mention Andrew departure to the Principality of Halych and Archbishop John's famous letter. Considering the latter as later insertions, Körmendi separated those texts where the prelate's role is appeared.

1. Annals of Salzburg (Annales Salisburgenses): its main corpus was written before 1216. It narrates that while Andrew led a campaign into Halych, the queen was murdered by Peter "as revenge for her sin". Peter himself, along with others, was captured and beheaded the next night. Its other text variant (compiled after 1222) contains John's letter, which is a subsequent insertion.
2. Continuation of Magnus von Reichersberg's Chronicle: the unidentified author took over the text from the Annals of Salzburg. Accordingly, during the king's absence, Peter and others assassinated the queen. He was executed together with his wife and others.
3. Annals of Hermann of Altach (Annales Hermanni): Its author, the Abbot of Niederaltaich, used the text of the Annals of Salzburg. Hermann writes that Gertrude, "the mother of Saint Elizabeth", was assassinated by a certain ispán Peter, while the Hungarian king led a campaign against the Rus'. Peter and his accompanies were beheaded the next night. The text also contains the story of the letter of the bishop of Esztergom (sic!).
4. Chronicle of Osterhofen (Chronicon Osterhoviense): the chronicle from the Osterhofen Abbey (written around 1306) contains the same text as in Hermann of Altach's annals.
5. Benedictine Annals of Augsburg (Annales Sanctorum Udalrici et Afrae Augustenses): compiled by the Benedictine monks of the St. Ulrich's and St. Afra's Abbey in Augsburg. It contains the same text as in Hermann of Altach's annals.
6. Foundations of Monasteries in Bavaria (Fundationes monasteriorum Bavariae): the compilation contains the same text as in Hermann of Altach's annals, but with wrong year (1211). It also mentions the queen's death in an earlier entry, under the year 1200.
7. Chronicle of the Anonymus of Leoben (Chronicon Leobiense): the unidentified author writes about the assassination twice, under the years 1213 and 1217 (the latter is just a four-word marginal note). It narrates that "the mother of Saint Elizabeth" was murdered by a noble, a certain "Peter of Várad", because the queen's brother Ekbert committed adultery with Peter's wife with Gertrude's knowledge. Subsequently, Béla, the queen's son confiscated Peter's castle and established a Cistercian abbey in its place. The manuscript also mentions "a bishop"'s letter. The untrustworthy text contaminates parallel oral traditions into a single text, but the information of the foundation of Bélakút Abbey is authentic.

=== Group C – Reginam occidere ===
These sources only contain the alleged letter of John, Archbishop of Esztergom in connection with the assassination of Queen Gertrude. The story was later also included in a second-hand manuscript of the Annals of Salzburg and its derivative texts (see above).

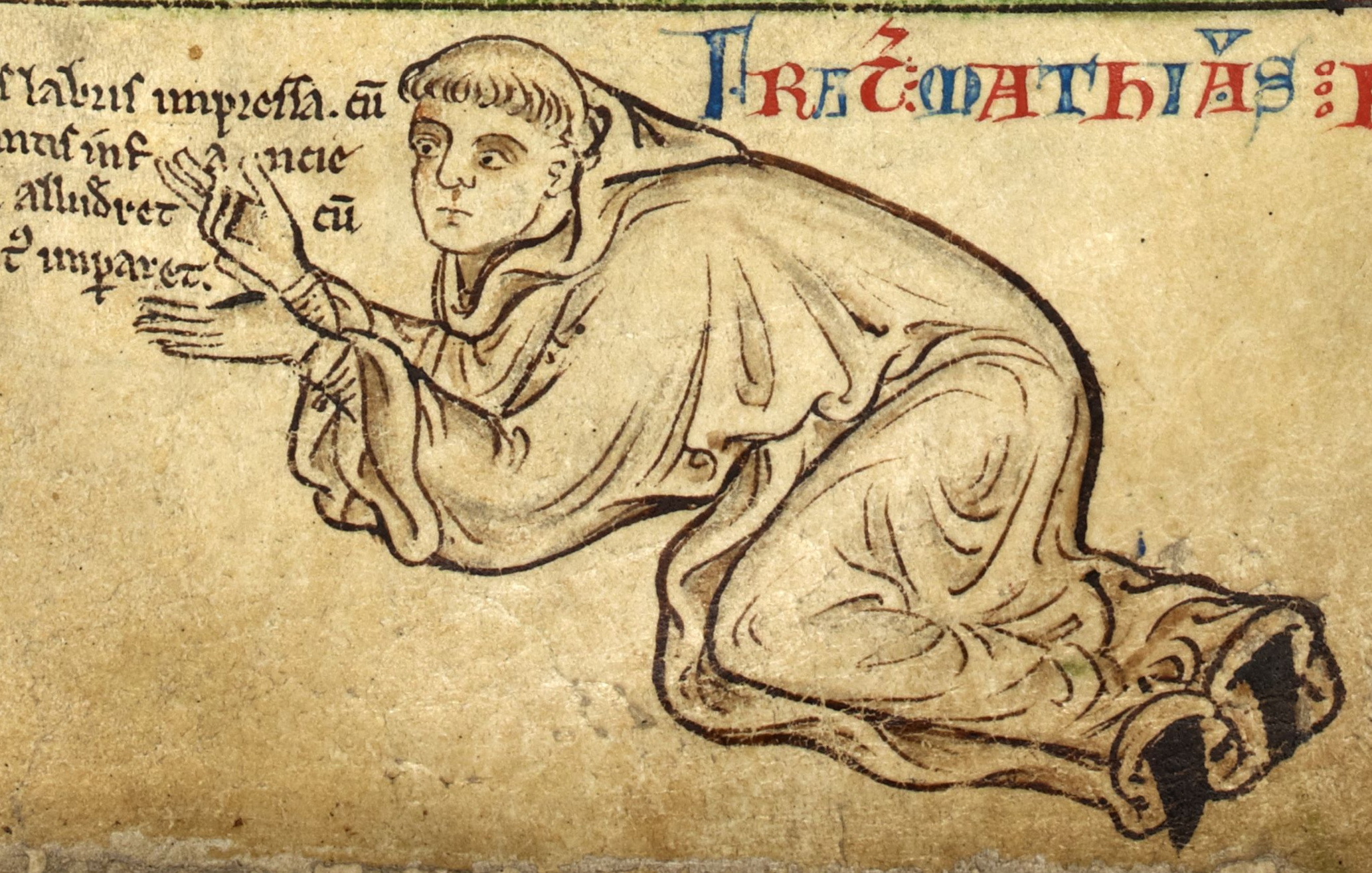
Matthew of Paris

1. The Latest Rhetoric (Rhetorica novissima): Boncompagno da Signa's rhetoric textbook, written before 1235, is the earliest work, which contains the story of the letter. Accordingly, King Andrew accused Archbishop John of participating in the murder before the Holy See. However Pope Innocent III, pointing out the correct use of commas, acquitted the archbishop from the charges. These references emphasize the letter's unintended ambiguity and, thus, John's approval of murder. Boncompagno resided in the papal court from 1229 to 1234, it is plausible he heard the story during his stay there.
2. Alberic of Trois-Fontaines' Chronicle (Chronica Albrici Monachi Trium Fontium): the chronicler refers to the history of John's ambiguous letter as "well-known", as a result of which the archbishop was acquitted, "it is said". It is possible that Alberic used oral reports from Cistercian monks.
3. Major Chronicle (Chronica Majora): it is possible that Matthew of Paris used Boncompagno's rhetoric textbook.
4. The History of England (Historia Anglorum): Matthew of Paris' other work mentions that the assassins carried out the murder with the approval of the archbishop. The reinterpretation of the letter praises Pope Innocent's ingenuity.

=== Group D – Bánk's revenge ===
Those sources belong to this group, where Gertrude's alleged role of procuress in the adulterous affair between her brother and Bánk Bár-Kalán's wife appear.

1. Austrian Rhyming Chronicle (Chronicon rhytmicum Austriacum): it was written by a Hungarian-born cleric in Klosterneuburg Abbey around 1270. According to several German and Austrian historians (e.g. Wilhelm Wattenbach and Karl Uhlirz), the author used only verbal or oral notifications, while Ernst Klebel argued the Annals of Heiligenkreuz was available to the chronicler. Gerlinde Möser-Mersky considered the author used the lost annals of the Schottenstift in Vienna. According to Gyula Pauler, the Hungarian cleric witnessed the fall of Bánk Bár-Kalán and the subsequent political purges after Béla IV ascended the Hungarian throne in 1235, and connected these with the retaliation for the assassination of Queen Gertrude. Körmendi considered the author maybe used the mid-13th-century edition of the Hungarian chronicle composition. The Austrian Rhyming Chronicle is the earliest known work, where the Bánk story is appeared: Berthold persuaded the queen, his sister, to help him seduce the wife of Bánk. Gertrude was initially hesitant but, eventually, assisted her brother. In retaliation, Bánk and his confidants conspired against the queen, beheading her at a "field tent". The assassins were held accountable only after Béla was crowned.
2. Annals of the Dominicans of Vienna (Annales Praedicatorum Vindobonensium): the first work (late 13th century), which provides the exact date of the assassination. Accordingly, Gertrude was murdered in a "field tent" on 28 September, because she helped her brother, the Patriarch of Aquileia (anachronism) to seduce the wife of Bánk, also called Prenger. Körmendi argued the manuscript used the text of the Austrian Rhyming Chronicle, in addition to necrologies.
3. World Chronicle (Weltchronik): the Austrian chronicler Jans der Enikel (late 13th century) compiled a completely unreliable report in the second appendix of his Middle High German-language universal chronicle; following the death of King Stephen (sic!), he left behind a widow Gertrude and an heir Béla. The powerful Prangaer family sought to get power over Hungary. Despite their invitation, the bishop of Győr refused to join their cause and clearly warned the conspirators against attempting to assassinate the queen. Despite that, Gertrude was attacked and beheaded, while the child Béla was assaulted but survived. Thereafter, after growing up, Béla ordered to massacre the entire Prangaer kinship. Because of the family name, Gerlinde Möser-Mersky assumed a philological connection between Jans der Enikel's chronicle and the Annals of the Dominicans of Vienna. Körmendi argued both works used a same, now lost source.
4. Illuminated Chronicle (Chronicon Pictum): also known as the 14th-century Hungarian chronicle composition, the only medieval chronicle in Hungary (compiled in the 1350s) from the pre-Renaissance era, which narrates the assassination of Queen Gertrude. It incorrectly dates the event to the year 1212. According to Körmendi, the (original) author utilized the narration of the Austrian Rhyming Chronicle, or vica versa. Later, the text of the Illuminated Chronicle was utilized by subsequent Hungarian chronicles and Henry of Mügeln's Ungarnchronik.
5. Austrian Chronicle (Chronicon Austriae): Thomas Ebendorfer compiled his work between 1449 and 1452. The author incorrectly connected the events of assassination to King Andrew's departure for his participation in the Fifth Crusade in 1217–1218. It also claims that Gertrude was the daughter of the duke of Moravia. According to the historian, Leopold VI was present during the skirmish. Ebendorfer utilized the text of the Illuminated Chronicle supplementing with the narration of the Annals of Admont.

==== Group D/2 – Gertrude's innocence ====
Tamás Körmendi listed those works to this sub-group, where the story of Bánk Bár-Kalán appear but emphasize Gertrude's innocence. According to the historian these narratives were born to deny the queen's role as a procuress, primarily in the territory of the Holy Roman Empire.

1. Founders of the Monastery of Diessen (De fundatoribus monasterii Diessenses): the text (from the 15th century) incorrectly places the year to 1200. According to the text, Berthold, the Patriarch of Aquileia (anachronism) kept his eye on a Hungarian noblewoman during the betrothal of Saint Elizabeth and Louis of Thuringia in Buda. He raped the woman and returned to home, thereafter. The noblelady's husband began to suspect the queen's involvement. He hired assassins, who broke into her place and Gertrude was strangled and hanged. However, after his happened, all perpetrators were paralyzed and fell to the ground. In the morning they confessed their sins to the arriving courtiers. Gertrude was canonized after this and other miracle signs. The Augustinian monastery of Diessen (or Dießen) was founded by the Counts of Andechs, who were originated from this area and possessed the right of patronage over the abbey until their extinction. The monks tried to clarify Gertrud's innocence with this "counterpropaganda tool". Despite he was also a family member, the text does not acquit Berthold from the charge of adultery or even rape.
2. Universal Chronicle (Chronkon universale): the chronicler Andreas of Ratisbon, who wrote his work around 1427 or 1428, derived his narration from the preceding source (also with the wrong year), but, from a syntactic point of view, it is a more elaborate work. Perhaps Andreas used an earlier version of the Founders of the Monastery of Diessen. Later, Ulrich Onsorg's Chronicon Bavariae and Veit Arnpeck's Chronicon Baioariorum handed over the same story too.

=== Group E – Miscellaneous ===
These works do not connect either narrative traditions and there is no philological connection between each other.

1. Annals of Conrad of Scheyern: the author was the librarian of the Benedictine Scheyern Abbey from 1205 to 1241. He compiled the annals up to 1226. According to the text, Gertrude was assassinated "by her own nobles" in 1214 (sic!).
2. Legend of St. Elizabeth (Vita Sanctae Elisabethae de Thuringia): Theodoric of Apolda wrote the hagiography of St. Elizabeth, Gertrude's daughter, in 1290. The text narrates that Gertrude was "brutally murdered by the magnates and nobles of the realm, who conspired evilly for her death". It correctly places the date to 1213. It is possible that Theodoric utilized the now-lost Annals of Reinhardsbrunn.
3. Short Bavarian–Austrian Annals (Annales Bavarici et Austriaci breves): an early 14th-century record, which is similar to Conrad of Scheyern's wording.
4. Chronicle of Reinhardsbrunn (Chronica Reinhardsbrunnensis): it was compiled in the late 14th century and is almost verbatim with the hagiography of St. Elizabeth by Theodoric of Apolda. The authors used the now-lost Annals of Reinhardsbrunn.
5. Chronicle of Thuringia (Düringische Chronik): the author is Johannes Rothe (c. 1360–1434), chaplain of Anna of Schwarzburg-Blankenburg, the spouse of Frederick IV, Landgrave of Thuringia. He finished his German-language work in 1421. Regarding the assassination of Gertrude, the chronicle provides a unique story: Hungarian lords conspired against the "pious" Gertrude in 1212, because one of them intended his own daughter to be the queen of the country. As a result of their intrigues, the king ordered to decapitate his queen but the daughter of the Hungarian lord never became queen.

== Cultural legacy ==
Bánk's story, which was preserved by the Illuminated Chronicle, inspired many subsequent chroniclers and authors in Hungary, for instance the Chronicon Posoniense; 1350s) and Johannes de Thurocz's Chronica Hungarorum (1480s). Antonio Bonfini, the court historian of King Matthias Corvinus expanded the story in his chronicle Rerum Ungaricarum decades ("Ten Volumes of Hungarian Matters") in the 1490s. Bonfini combined the events with Andrew's crusade took place four years later. Accordingly, Bánk appeared in the royal camp in the Holy Land, where he confessed to the murder. Thereafter, Andrew acquitted him, for he learned of his wife's "sin" which caused her assassination. Based on Bonfini's work, the 16th-century Transylvanian chronicler András Valkai wrote the first Hungarian-language epic poem under the title Az Nagysagos Bank Bannak Historia in 1567. Gáspár Heltai also translated the story to Hungarian in his work Chronica az magyaroknak dolgairól in 1575.

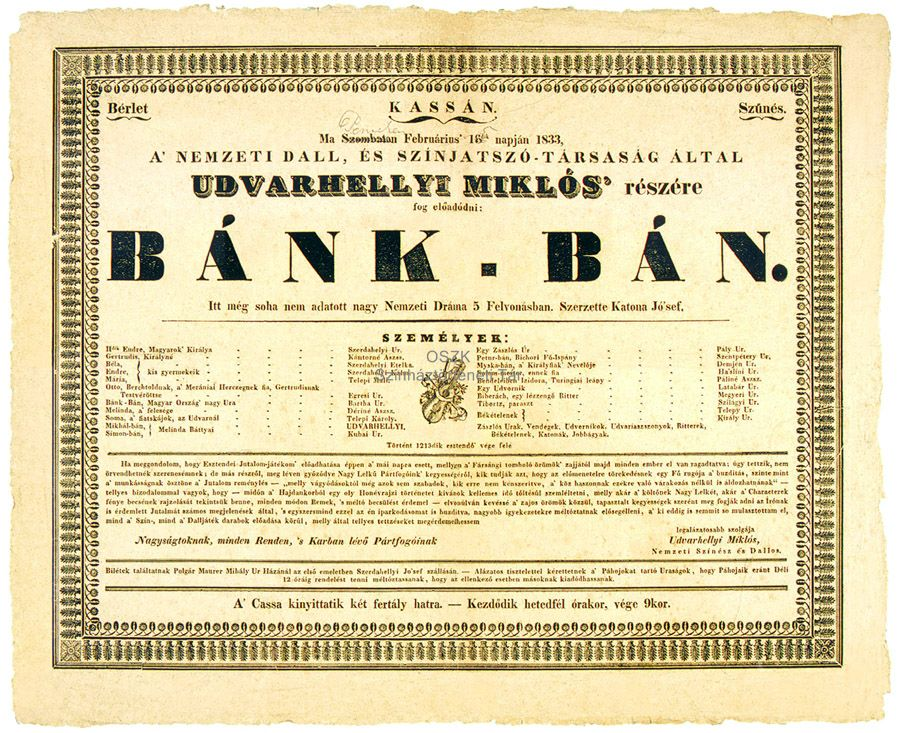
Premiere of the stage play Bánk bán in 1833

Bonfini's chronicle was also translated into German in 1545, which allowed the story of Bánk to spread in the German-speaking territories as well. Poet Hans Sachs wrote a tragedy on Ban Bánk under the title Andreas der ungarisch König mit Bankbano seinem getreutem Statthalter in 1561, updating the story to his own age at a few points (for instance, the appearance of the Ottoman Empire as enemy and the theses of the Reformation). The English playwright George Lillo also processed the story, but modified the plot at several points in his play Elmerick, or Justice Triumphant in 1739. The German poet Ludwig Heinrich von Nicolay wrote a ballad in the subject around 1795, while Johann Friedrich Ernst Albrecht created a dramatic poem (Der gerechte Andreas) in 1797. Independently from Katona's play and its derivative works, Austrian dramatist Franz Grillparzer wrote his historical tragedy in the subject (Ein treuer Diener seines Herrn) in 1826.

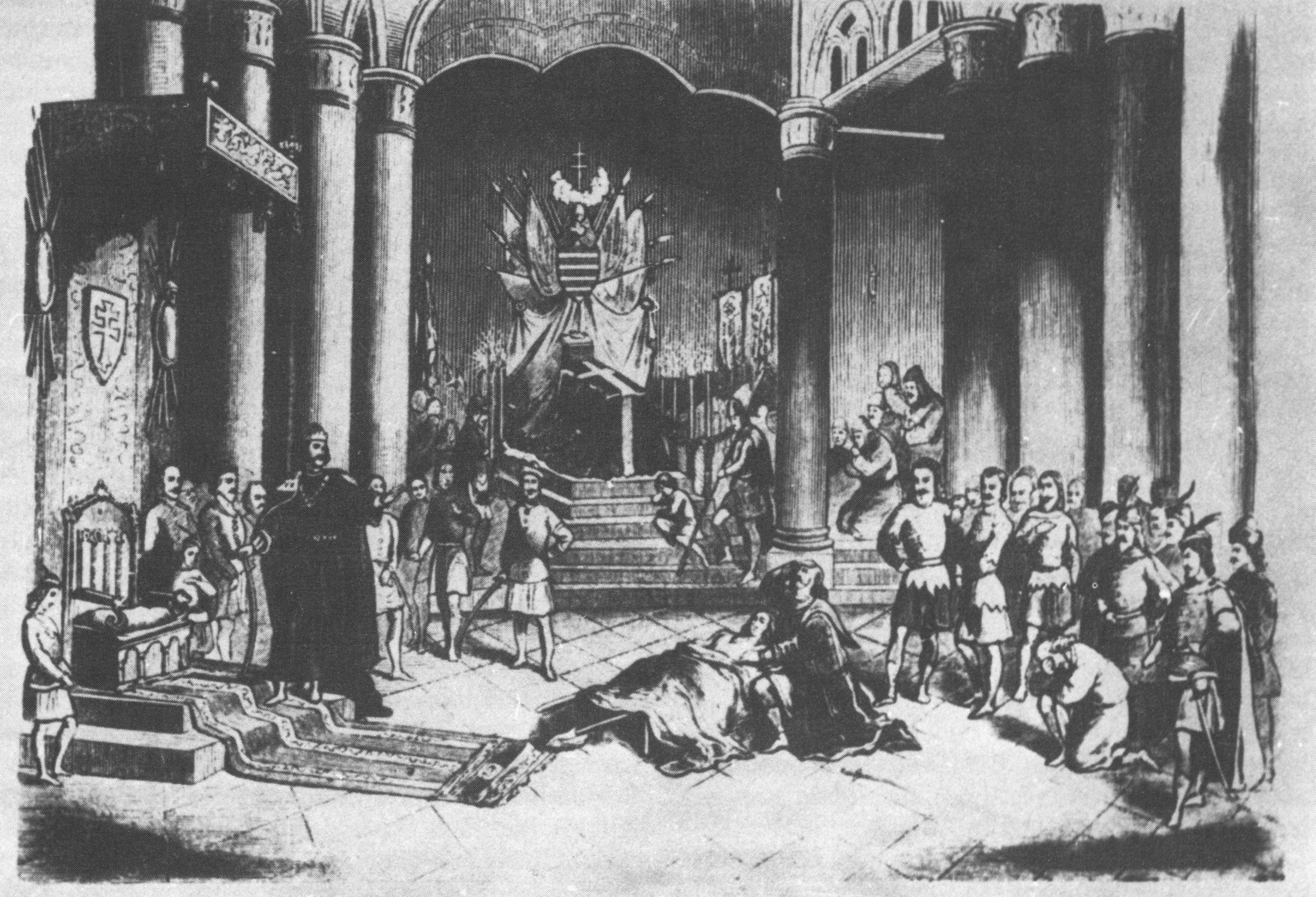
Scene from the 1861 opera with the same name

József Katona wrote the first edition of his play Bánk bán in 1814. He completely reworked the text in 1819, which was first printed in 1820. Its premiere, however, took place only in 1833. Katona utilized mostly the texts of Bonfini, Sachs, Valkai and Heltai. Despite the initial lack of interest of success, Katona's stage play became symbol of the Hungarian national revival; it was presented on the eve of the Hungarian Revolution of 1848. Based on Katona's work, Ferenc Erkel composed an opera in 3 acts with the same name, also using the libretto by Béni Egressy. The opera was first performed at the Pesti Nemzeti Magyar Szinház in Pest on 9 March 1861. The Bánk bán is labelled as Hungary's national opera.

In the play and the opera, the character of Bánk appears as a tragic hero and "defender" of the Hungarian national interests against the "oppressive" Queen Gertrude and her foreign courtiers. Since the early 19th-century historiography still assumed identity between Bánk and his contemporary Benedict, son of Korlát, Katona called Bánk as "the son of Conrad" and modeled his fictional wife Melinda on the "beautiful" court lady Tota, who was the spouse of Benedict. As Tota belonged to the Nagymartoni family of Aragonese origin, Katona mistakenly connected "Melinda" to the kinship. In his play, Melinda's brothers, bans Mikhal and Simon of Boioth were of Spanish origin. Both of them are involved in the assassination. In fact, another couple of brothers, Simon and Michael Kacsics were that nobles, who were embroiled in suspicion of their involvement in the murder. In Katona's stage play, Gertrude's another brother Otto, who raped Bánk's wife, instead of Archbishop Berthold. In reality, Otto never stayed in Hungary.

== Sources ==
- Benkő, Elek (2014). "Reginam occidere ...". In Bárány, Attila; Dreska, Gábor; Szovák, Kornél (eds.). Arcana tabularii. Tanulmányok Solymosi László tiszteletére (in Hungarian). Magyar Tudományos Akadémia; Debreceni Egyetem; Eötvös Loránd Tudományegyetem Bölcsészettudományi Kara; Pázmány Péter Katolikus Egyetem. pp. 495–511. ISBN 978-963-4737-59-9.
- Érszegi, Géza; Solymosi, László (1981). "Az Árpádok királysága, 1000–1301 [The Monarchy of the Árpáds, 1000–1301]". In Solymosi, László (ed.). Magyarország történeti kronológiája, I: a kezdetektől 1526-ig [Historical Chronology of Hungary, Volume I: From the Beginning to 1526] (in Hungarian). Akadémiai Kiadó. pp. 79–187. ISBN 963-05-2661-1.
- Fügedi, Erik (1986). Ispánok, bárók, kiskirályok [Ispáns, Barons and Petty Kings]. Magvető. ISBN 963-14-0582-6.
- Körmendi, Tamás (2014). "A Gertrúd királyné elleni merénylet körülményei [The Circumstances of the Murder of Queen Gertrude]". In Majorossy, Judit (ed.). Egy történelmi gyilkosság margójára. Merániai Gertrúd emlékezete, 1213–2013 (in Hungarian). Ferenczy Museum, Szentendre. pp. 95–124. ISBN 978-963-9590-77-9.
- Körmendi, Tamás (2019a). Az 1196–1235 közötti magyar történelem nyugati elbeszélő forrásainak kritikája [A Criticism of Western Narrative Sources for the History of Hungary in the period between 1196 and 1235] (in Hungarian). MTA Bölcsészettudományi Kutatóközpont Történettudományi Intézet. ISBN 978-963-416-163-9.
- Körmendi, Tamás (2019b). "Megjegyzések Gertrúd királyné és udvara szerepéhez az országos politikában [Remarks on the Role of Queen Gertrude and Her Court in National Politics]". In Szovák, Kornél; Zsoldos, Attila (eds.). Királynék a középkori Magyarországon és Európában (in Hungarian). Városi Levéltár és Kutatóintézet. pp. 45–58. ISBN 978-963-8406-22-4.
- Körmendi, Tamás (2019c). "A Bánk bán és a történeti valóság [The Bánk bán and Historical Reality]". Magyaróra (in Hungarian). 1 (1–4). Anyanyelvápolók Szövetsége: 12–19. ISSN 2676-976X.
- Kristó, Gyula (1990). "Magyar öntudat és idegenellenesség az Árpád-kori Magyarországon [Hungarian Identity and Xenophobia in Árpádian Hungary]". Irodalomtörténeti Közlemények (in Hungarian). 94 (4): 425–443. ISSN 0021-1486.
- Majorossy, Judit (2014). "A középkori Gertrúd-történet utóélete dióhéjban [The Afterlife of the Medieval Gertrude Story in a Nutshell]". In Majorossy, Judit (ed.). Egy történelmi gyilkosság margójára. Merániai Gertrúd emlékezete, 1213–2013 (in Hungarian). Ferenczy Museum, Szentendre. pp. 303–304. ISBN 978-963-9590-77-9.
- Nekić, Antun (2023). "Short Remarks on the Murder of Queen Gertrude (1213)". Chronica. 22. Institute of History, University of Szeged: 103–112. ISSN 1588-2039.
- Pauler, Gyula (1899). A magyar nemzet története az Árpád-házi királyok alatt, II. [The History of the Hungarian Nation during the Árpádian Kings, Vol. 2.] (in Hungarian). Athenaeum.
- Veszprémy, László (1994). "A Gertrúd királyné kerítőnői szerepéről kialakult legenda jogi hátteréről [On the Legal Background of the Legend about the Role of Queen Gertrude as a Procuress]". In Draskóczy, István (ed.). Scripta manent. Ünnepi tanulmányok a 60. életévét betöltött Gerics József professzor tiszteletére (in Hungarian). ELTE Középkori és Kora-újkori Magyar Történeti Tanszék. pp. 81–84. ISBN 963-462-92-0-2.
- Zsoldos, Attila (2005). Az Árpádok és asszonyaik. A királynéi intézmény az Árpádok korában [The Árpáds and their Women: The Institution of Queenship in the Era of the Árpáds] (in Hungarian). MTA Történettudományi Intézete. ISBN 963-8312-98-X.
