= Ekbert of Bamberg =

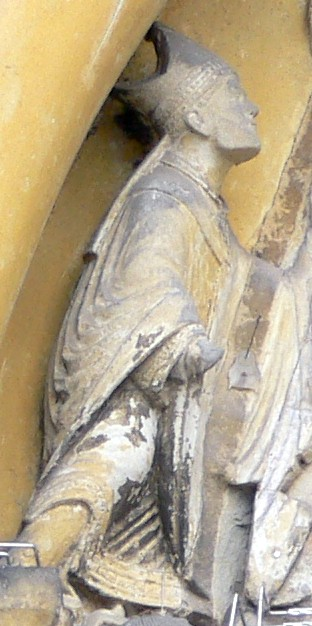
Eckbert in the Tympanum of the Gnadenpforte of Bamberg Cathedral

Ekbert of Andechs-Meranien (also called Ekbert of Bamberg) (after 1173 – 5 June 1237 in Vienna) was Prince-Bishop of Bamberg, Germany from 1203 until his death. He was the son of Berthold IV, Duke of Merania and Agnes of Rochlitz, and a brother of Saint Hedwig of Silesia and Gertrude of Merania, Queen of Hungary.

== Life ==
In 1208, after Count Otto VIII of Wittelsbach murdered the Hohenstaufen King Philip of Swabia in Bamberg, the perpetrator was able to flee to southern Bavaria with his loyal followers. Bishop Ekbert and his brother Margrave Henry II of Istria were suspected of knowing about the Wittelsbach family's plans to murder the king, and they initially fell out of favor with the royal family. The medieval historians either express doubts about the complicity of the Andechs, or they do not even address other perpetrators outside the narrower context of the Wittelsbachs.

Ekbert fled to Hungary to his sister Gertrude of Merania, Queen of Hungary.

During Ekbert's episcopate, Bamberg Cathedral was built. Ekbert was a partisan of Emperor Friedrich II. He took part in the imperial invasion of the Duchy of Austria in 1236, when Duke Frederick the Quarrelsome was banned. In 1237 he became governor for Austria and Styria installed by the emperor, but died shortly thereafter.
