= List of Hungarian royal consorts =

This is a list of the queens consort of Hungary (Hungarian: királyné), the consorts of the kings of Hungary. After the extinction of the Árpád dynasty and later the Angevin dynasty, the title of King of Hungary has been held by a monarch outside of Hungary with a few exceptions. After 1526, the title of Queen of Hungary belonged to the wife of the Habsburg Emperors who were also King of Hungary.

Queens of Hungary also held the titles after 1526: Holy Roman Empress (later Empress of Austria) and Queen consort of Bohemia. Since Leopold I, all kings of Hungary used the title of Apostolic King of Hungary – the title given to Saint Stephen I by the Pope – and their wives were styled as Apostolic Queens of Hungary.

The title lasted just a little over nine centuries, from 1000 to 1918.

The Kingdom of Hungary also had two queens regnant (királynő) who were crowned as kings: Maria I and Maria II Theresa.

== Grand Princesses of the Hungarians ==
Name	Father	Birth	Ethnicity	Religion	Marriage	Consort reign	Death	Spouse
Emese	Eunedubelianus	unknown	Hungarian	Paganism	Undated		unknown	Ügyek
Unnamed	Ménmarót	unknown	Hungarian	Paganism	Undated	? – c. 947?	unknown	Zoltán
Unnamed of the territories of the Cumans	unknown	unknown	Cumans	Paganism	c. 945	c. 955 – before 972	unknown	Taksony
Unnamed	unknown	unknown	Pecheneg or Bulgar	Paganism	c. 945	c. 955 – before 972	unknown	Taksony
Sarolt	Gyula II of Transylvania	c. 950	Hungarian	Eastern Orthodox	before 972	before 972 – c. 995	after 997	Géza
Gisela	Henry II of Bavaria (Ottonian)	c. 985	Bavarian	Roman Catholic	c. 995	995 – 25 December 1000/ 1 January 1001	7 May 1033/ 1065	Vajk

== Queens consort of Hungary ==
=== House of Árpád, 1000–1038 ===
Picture	Name	Father	Birth	Marriage	Became consort	Ceased to be consort	Death	Spouse
	Giselle of Bavaria	Henry II, Duke of Bavaria (Ottonian)	985	995	25 December 1000/ 1 January 1001 husband's coronation	15 August 1038 husband's death	7 May 1033/65	Stephen I

=== House of Orseolo, 1038/44–1041/46 ===
Picture	Name	Father	Birth	Marriage	Became consort	Ceased to be consort	Death	Spouse
	Tuta	unknown Some authors claim that her name was Tuta, who was mentioned as "Queen Tuta", the founder of the Suben Abbey, but no sources prove that she was either Queen of Hungary or wife of King Peter						Peter
	Judith of Schweinfurt	Henry of Schweinfurt (Babenberg)	most likely never occurred (before 1003 – 2 August 1058)					Peter

=== House of Aba, 1041–1044 ===
Picture	Name	Father	Birth	Marriage	Became consort	Ceased to be consort	Death	Spouse
	unnamed	Géza, Grand Prince of the Hungarians (Árpád)	unknown					Samuel

=== House of Árpád, 1046–1301 ===
Picture	Name	Father	Birth	Marriage	Became consort	Ceased to be consort	Death	Spouse
	Anastasia of Kiev	Yaroslav I the Wise (Rurik)	1023	1039	1046 husband's accession	before 6 December 1060 husband's death	1074/96	Andrew I
	Richeza of Poland	Mieszko II Lambert (Piast)	22 September 1013	1039–43	1060 husband's accession	11 September 1063 husband's death	21 May 1075	Béla I
	Judith of Swabia	Henry III, Holy Roman Emperor (Ottonian)	9 April 1054	September 1063		August 1074 husband's despostion	14 March 1093/96	Solomon
	Synadena	Theodulos Synadenos (Synadenos)	–	1075		25 April 1077 husband's death	after 1079	Géza I
	Adelaide of Rheinfelden	Rudolf of Rheinfelden (Rheinfelden)	1067/70	1077 or after	25 April 1077 husband's accession	3 May 1090		Ladislaus I
	Felicia of Sicily	Roger I, Count of Sicily (Hauteville)	1078	1097		1102		Coloman
	Euphemia of Kiev	Vladimir II of Kiev (Rurik)	–	1104/12		1113 repudiated	4 April 1139	Coloman
	Unnamed	Robert I, Prince of Capua (Drengot)	–	1120		before 1121		Stephen II
	Helena of Raška	Uroš I, Grand Župan of Raška (Vojislavljević)	after 1109	28 August 1127	1 March 1131 husband's accession	13 February 1141 husband's death	after 1146	Béla II
	Euphrosyne of Kiev	Mstislav I of Kiev (Rurik)	1130	1146		31 May 1162 husband's death	1186–93	Géza II
	Agnes of Austria	Henry II, Duke of Austria (Babenberg)	1154	1168		4 March 1172 husband's death	13 January 1182	Stephen III
	Maria Komnene	Manuel I Komnenos (Komnenoi)	1144	1157	14 January 1163 husband's accession	11 April 1165 husband's death	1190	Stephen IV
	Agnes of Antioch	Raynald of Châtillon, Prince of Antioch	1154	1170	4 March 1172 husband's accession	1184		Béla III
	Margaret of France	Louis VII of France (Capet)	November 1157	1185/86		23 April 1196 husband's death	August/September 1197	Béla III
	Constance of Aragon	Alfonso II of Aragon (Barcelona)	1179	1198		30 September/30 November 1204 husband's death	23 June 1222	Emeric
	Gertrude of Merania	Berthold IV, Duke of Merania (Andechs)	1185	before 1203	7 May 1205 husband's accession	28 September 1213		Andrew II
	Yolanda de Courtenay	Peter II of Courtenay (Courtenay)	1200	February 1215		1233		Andrew II
	Beatrice d'Este	Aldobrandino I of Este (Este)	1215	14 May 1234		21 September 1235 husband's death	1245, before 8 May	Andrew II
	Maria Laskarina	Theodore I Laskaris (Laskarid)	1206	1218	21 September 1235 husband's accession	3 May 1270 husband's death	16 July or 24 June 1270	Béla IV
	Elizabeth the Cuman	Köten	1240	around 1253	3 May 1270 husband's accession	6 August 1272 husband's death	after 1290	Stephen V
	Elizabeth of Sicily	Charles I of Naples (Anjou)	1261	1270	5 September 1272	10 July 1290 husband's death	c. 1300	Ladislaus IV
	Fenenna of Kuyavia	Ziemomysł of Kujavia (Piast)	1261	September–November 1290		1295		Andrew III
	Agnes of Austria	Albert I of Germany (Habsburg)	18 May 1281	13 February 1296		14 January 1301 husband's death	10 June 1364	Andrew III

=== House of Přemyslid, 1301–1305 ===
Picture	Name	Father	Birth	Marriage	Became consort	Ceased to be consort	Death	Spouse
	Viola of Teschen	Mieszko I, Duke of Teschen (Piast)	1290	5 October 1305		9 October 1305 husband renounces throne	21 September 1317	Wenceslaus

=== House of Wittelsbach, 1305–1308 ===
Wenceslaus's successor Otto's first wife, Katharine of Habsburg, died 23 years before her husband became King of Hungary; and he married his second wife, Agnes of Glogau, two years after he lost the throne to Charles I.

=== Capetian House of Anjou, 1308–1395 ===
Charles Martel of Anjou pressed his claim to the throne of Hungary and became titular King of Hungary in 1290; his wife, Klementia of Habsburg became titular queen consort of Hungary, but Charles Martel failed to govern Hungary and died in 1295. Charles Martel and Klementia were never the proper King and Queen. Charles Martel also died in his parents' lifetime.

Picture	Name	Father	Birth	Marriage	Became consort	Ceased to be consort	Death	Spouse
	Maria of Bytom	Casimir of Bytom (Piast)	1280–90	1306		15 December 1317		Charles I
	Beatrice of Luxembourg	Henry VII, Holy Roman Emperor (Luxembourg)	1305	24 June/September 1318		11 November 1319		Charles I
	Elisabeth of Poland	Władysław I the Elbow-high (Piast)	1305	6 July 1320		16 July 1342 husband's death	29 December 1380	Charles I
	Margaret of Bohemia	Charles IV, Holy Roman Emperor (Luxembourg)	24 May 1335	3 August 1342	16 July 1342 husband's accession	1349, before October		Louis I
	Elizabeth of Bosnia	Stephen II, Ban of Bosnia (House of Kotromanić)	1340	20 June 1353		10 September 1382 husband's death	before 16 January 1387	Louis I
	Margaret of Durazzo	Charles, Duke of Durazzo (Anjou-Durazzo)	28 July 1347	24 January 1369/70	31 December 1385 husband's coronation	24 February 1386 husband's death	6 August 1412	Charles II

=== House of Luxembourg, 1395–1437 ===
Picture	Name	Father	Birth	Marriage	Became consort	Ceased to be consort	Death	Spouse
	Barbara of Celje	Herman II, Count of Celje (Celje)	1390/95	1406		9 December 1437 husband's death	11 July 1451	Sigismund

=== House of Habsburg, 1437–1439 ===
Picture	Name	Father	Birth	Marriage	Became consort	Ceased to be consort	Death	Spouse
	Elizabeth of Luxembourg	Sigismund, Holy Roman Emperor (Luxembourg)	7 October 1409	28 September 1421	9 December 1437 husband's accession	27 October 1439 husband's death	19 December 1442	Albert I

=== House of Jagiellon, 1440–1444 ===
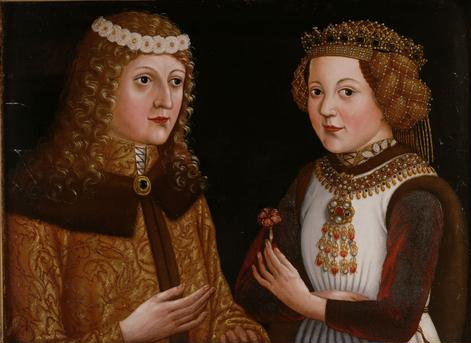
Painting of Ladislaus the Posthumous and his fiancée, Magdalena of Valois.

Ulászló I had no children and did not get married (contemporary opinions, quoted by Jan Długosz, suggested that he was homosexual). He was succeeded in Poland by his younger brother Casimir IV Jagiellon in 1447 after a three-year interregnum. In Hungary, he was succeeded by his former rival, the child Ladislaus the Posthumous.

=== House of Habsburg, 1440/44–1457 ===
Ladislaus the Posthumous died suddenly in Prague on 23 November 1457 while preparing for his marriage to Magdalena of Valois, daughter of Charles VII of France. He and Magdalena, therefore, never married.

=== House of Hunyadi, 1458–1490 ===
Picture	Name	Father	Birth	Marriage	Became consort	Ceased to be consort	Death	Spouse
	Catherine of Poděbrady	George of Bohemia (Podiebrad)	11 November 1449	1 May 1461		8 March 1464		Matthias I Corvinus
	Beatrice of Naples	Ferdinand I of Naples (Trastámara)	16 November 1457	15 December 1476		6 April 1490 husband's death	23 September 1508	Matthias I Corvinus

=== House of Jagiellon, 1490–1526 ===
Picture	Name	Father	Birth	Marriage	Became consort	Ceased to be consort	Death	Spouse
	Barbara of Brandenburg	Albert III, Elector of Brandenburg (Hohenzollern)	30 May 1464	20 August 1476	18 September 1490 husband's accession	1491 divorce	4 September 1515	Vladislaus II
	Beatrice of Naples	Ferdinand I of Naples (Trastámara)	16 November 1457	4 October 1490		7 April 1500 marriage annulled by Pope Alexander VI	23 September 1508	Vladislaus II
	Anna of Foix-Candale	Gaston de Foix, Count of Candale (Foix)	1484	29 September 1502		26 July 1506		Vladislaus II
	Maria of Austria	Philip I of Castile (Habsburg)	18 September 1505	13 January 1522		29 August 1526 husband's death	18 October 1558	Louis II

=== House of Szapolyai, 1526–1570 ===
In dispute with the Habsburgs.

Picture	Name	Father	Birth	Marriage	Became consort	Ceased to be consort	Death	Spouse
	Isabella Jagiellon	Sigismund I of Poland (Jagiellon)	18 January 1519	23 February 1539		22 July 1540 husband's death	15 September 1559	John I

=== House of Habsburg, 1526–1780 ===
Picture	Name	Father	Birth	Marriage	Became consort	Ceased to be consort	Death	Spouse
	Anna of Bohemia and Hungary	Vladislaus II of Bohemia and Hungary (Jagiellon)	23 July 1503	25 May 1521	29 August 1526 husband's accession	27 January 1547		Ferdinand I
	Maria of Spain	Charles V, Holy Roman Emperor (Habsburg)	21 June 1528	13 September 1548	September 1563 husband's accession	12 October 1576 husband's death	26 February 1603	Maximilian
	Anna of Austria	Ferdinand II, Archduke of Austria (Habsburg)	4 October 1585	4 December 1611		14 December 1618		Matthias II
	Eleonore of Mantua	Vincenzo I of Gonzaga (Gonzaga)	23 September 1598	4 February 1622		15 February 1637 husband's death	27 June 1655	Ferdinand II
	Maria Anna of Spain	Philip III of Spain (Habsburg)	18 August 1606	20 February 1631		13 May 1646		Ferdinand III
	Maria Leopoldine of Austria	Leopold V, Archduke of Austria (Habsburg)	6 April 1632	2 July 1648		7 August 1649		Ferdinand III
	Eleanor of Mantua	Charles II Gonzaga (Gonzaga)	18 November 1630	30 April 1651		2 April 1657 husband's death	6 December 1686	Ferdinand III
	Margaret Theresa of Spain	Philip IV of Spain (Habsburg)	12 July 1651	12 December 1666		12 March 1673		Leopold I
	Claudia Felicitas of Austria	Ferdinand Charles, Archduke of Austria (Habsburg)	30 May 1653	15 October 1673		8 April 1676		Leopold I
	Eleonore-Magdalena of Neuburg	Philipp Wilhelm, Elector Palatine (Wittelsbach)	6 January 1655	14 December 1676		5 May 1705 husband's death	19 January 1720	Leopold I
	Wilhelmina Amalia of Brunswick	John Frederick, Duke of Brunswick-Lüneburg (Welf)	21 April 1673	24 February 1699		17 April 1711 husband's death	10 April 1742	Joseph I
	Elisabeth Christine of Brunswick-Wolfenbüttel	Louis Rudolph, Duke of Brunswick-Lüneburg (Welf)	28 August (28 September?) 1691	1 August 1708	17 April 1711 husband's accession	20 October 1740 husband's death	21 December 1750	Charles III

=== House of Habsburg-Lorraine, 1780–1918 ===
Picture	Name	Father	Birth	Marriage	Became consort	Ceased to be consort	Death	Spouse
	Maria Luisa of Spain	Charles III of Spain (Bourbon)	24 November 1745	16 February 1764	20 February 1790 husband's accession	1 March 1792 husband's death	15 May 1792	Leopold II
	Maria Theresa of Naples and Sicily	Ferdinand I of the Two Sicilies (Bourbon-Two Sicilies)	6 June 1772	15 August 1790	1 March 1792 husband's accession	13 April 1807		Francis I
	Maria Ludovika of Austria-Este	Ferdinand I, Archduke of Austria-Este (Habsburg-Este)	14 December 1787	6 January 1808		7 April 1816		Francis I
	Caroline Augusta of Bavaria	Maximilian I Joseph of Bavaria (Wittelsbach)	8 February 1792	29 October 1816		28 September 1830 stepson became king	9 February 1873	Francis I
	Maria Anna of Savoy	Victor Emmanuel I of Sardinia (Savoy)	19 September 1803	12 February 1831		2 December 1848 husband's abdication	4 May 1884	Ferdinand V
	Elisabeth in Bavaria	Duke Maximilian Joseph in Bavaria (Wittelsbach)	24 December 1837	24 April 1854		10 September 1898		Francis Joseph I
	Zita of Bourbon-Parma	Robert I, Duke of Parma (Bourbon-Parma)	9 May 1892	13 June 1911	21 November 1916 husband's accession	11 November 1918 husband's deposition	14 March 1989	Charles IV

== See also ==
- List of Hungarian monarchs
- List of Transylvanian consorts
