= Henry II of Istria =

Henry II
- Margrave of Istria
- Coat-of-arms of Andechs
- Born: c. 1175
- Died: 18 July 1228; Slovenj Gradec
- Buried: Stična Abbey
- Noble family: House of Andechs
- Spouse: Sophie of Weichselburg
- Father: Berthold, Duke of Merania
- Mother: Agnes of Rochlitz

Henry II (c.1175 -18 July 1228) was a noble from the House of Andechs who ruled the March of Istria and Carniola from 1204 to 1228. He inherited the County of Stein (Kamnik in Upper Carniola), and expanded his domains to the Windic March through marriage. He died childless, and his vast possessions were eventually inherited by his niece Agnes of Merania.

== Life ==
He was the second son of Berthold IV, Duke of Merania and Agnes of Rochlitz, daughter of Dedi III, Margrave of Lusatia of the House of Wettin.

After the death of his father in 1204, Henry took over the dignity of Margrave of Istria-Krain and the possessions situated south of the Danube. In Istria itself, the Republic of Venice made life so hard, they virtually dominated the peninsula. The policies of their Doge, Enrico Dandolo, had left a powerful mark on the region. And as trade and influence spread towards Venice, Istria grew weaker.

Earlier in 1207, Henry II married Sophie, daughter and heir of Count Albert of Weichselburg (died 1209) in modern Slovenia, in which the Andechs spent huge wealth in the Windic March. The marriage would remain childless.

Then, in 1208, he had the misfortune of being in the wrong place at the wrong time: he became complicit in the murder of King Philip of Swabia, after the wedding of his oldest brother, Otto I, Duke of Merania and his bride Beatrice II, Countess of Burgundy at Bamberg, the seat of his second eldest brother, Ekbert, Bishop of Bamberg and the one who presided over the wedding. Today this incident is regarded a disgrace on the part of the House of Wittelsbach, but the rapid decline in support of the house of Andechs saw Henry II and Bishop Ekbert lose all rights, properties, dignities and revenues and had to flee to their sister, Gertrude, Queen of Hungary, in Hungary in 1209 for safety.

In 1211, Ekbert could return to his possessions, but Henry II could only regain the Windic March; while his Tyrolean and Bavarian possessions remained lost to him. Although he had a connection with Aquileia – his younger brother Berthold was Patriarch there from 1218 to 1251 – and Leopold VI, Duke of Austria, he was mainly limited as a privateer on his and Sophie's possessions in later Lower Styria and Krain. In 1220, he was "allowed" participation as a witness in the confirmation of the grant of his former Mark to Berthold. Henry was referred to as ispán of Moson County in Hungary in 1225.

In May 1228, an agreement between Henry II and Ludwig I, Duke of Bavaria, whom had taken his most of his possessions, was made. Some of his lands and rights were returned, but then in July, death suddenly overtook him in Windischgraz. He was buried in Dießen Abbey. His old Bavarian possessions were probably inherited by his brother Otto, while the Weichselburg lands remained shortly with Sophie.

Henry II of Istria House of Andechs Born: c.1175 Died: 1228
Regnal titles
Preceded by Berthold IV, Duke of Merania	Margrave of Istria; 1204–1228	Succeeded by Otto I, Duke of Merania
