= Berthold (patriarch of Aquileia) =

German-Hungarian archbishop (c. 1182 – 1251)

- Archbishop of Kalocsa
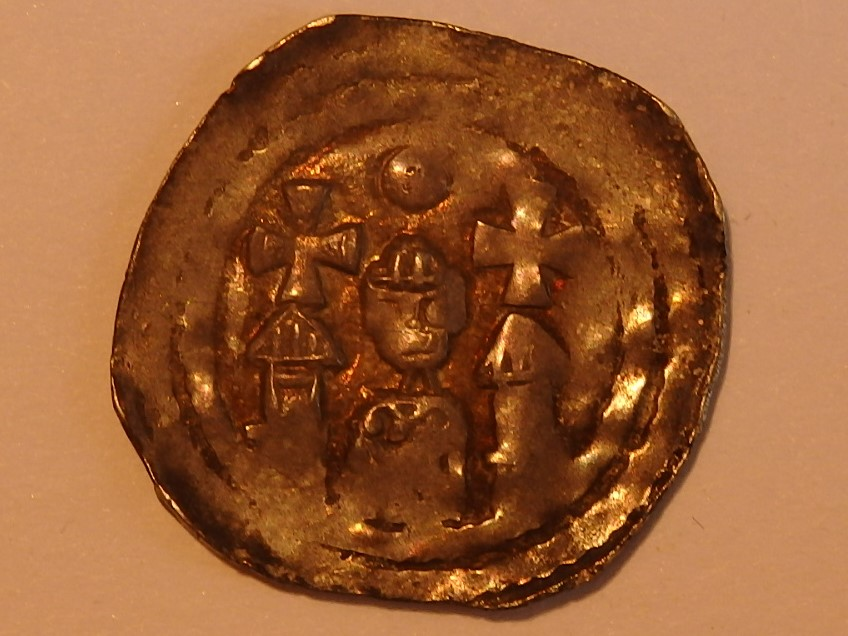
- Archdiocese: Kalocsa
- Installed: 1206
- Term ended: 1218
- Predecessor: sede vacante
- Successor: Ugrin Csák
- Other post: Patriarch of Aquileia

Personal details
- Born: c. 1182
- Died: 23 May 1251 Aquileia
- Buried: Basilica di Santa Maria Assunta, Aquileia
- Denomination: Catholic
- Children: Anselinus (illegitimate)

Berthold (German: Berthold von Andechs-Meran, Hungarian: Merániai Bertold, Italian: Bertoldo di Andechs-Merania; c. 1182 – 23 May 1251) was the count of Andechs (as Berthold V) from 1204, the archbishop of Kalocsa from 1206 until 1218, and the patriarch of Aquileia from 1218 until his death.

== Early life ==
He was born around 1182, as a younger son of the Bavarian count Berthold IV of Andechs, who was elevated to a duke of Merania by Emperor Frederick Barbarossa in 1183. His mother was Agnes of Rochlitz, a member of the Saxon Wettin dynasty. Among his siblings were Duke Otto I of Merania, French queen Agnes, Hungarian queen Gertrude, and Saint Hedwig of Silesia.

Berthold, chosen for an ecclesiastical career, became provost at the cathedral chapter of the Archdiocese of Bamberg in 1203, due to the intercession and influence of his elder brother Ekbert, the local bishop. Berthold served in this capacity until 1205.

== Archbishop of Kalocsa ==
=== Controversial election ===
Berthold followed his sister Gertrude to the Hungarian court under King Andrew II, who in the first half of 1206 had his brother-in-law nominated Archbishop of Kalocsa, succeeding John. The cathedral chapter elected him under the pressure of the Hungarian royal couple. Andrew II sent a letter to the Holy See in order to request the papal confirmation of his election. However, the appointment was not acknowledged by Pope Innocent III; according to his letter to King Andrew II in June 1206, the pope initiated an investigation on Berthold's age and education under the direction of Eberhard von Regensberg, Archbishop of Salzburg. The process revealed that Berthold may have been 25 years of age or slightly older and did not have an adequate education of canon law to become a suffragan. Consequently, Pope Innocent refused his election in April 1207, citing the violation of the canon of the Third Council of the Lateran. Upon the request of the king and the cathedral chapter (postulatio), however, the pope confirmed Berthold as Archbishop of Kalocsa in December 1207. The pope entrusted his papal legate Cardinal Gregorius de Crescentio to deal with the issue. Nevertheless, Berthold was styled as archbishop-elect until 1212. It is plausible he turned 30 that year, which was a condition for the election of a bishop, and Pope Innocent III sent his pallium shortly thereafter.

Following his confirmation, Berthold immediately left behind his archdiocese in order to study at the University of Vicenza. The pope was outraged at this decision. His letter to Andrew II in January 1209 says that Berthold caused public outrage, because – as a prelate – he studied among ordinary students exposing his incomplete knowledge and demonstrating his unworthiness for the archbishopric. According to the pope, the archiepiscopal see was in a more severe status than if it had been a sede vacante. Pope Innocent instructed Berthold to return to Kalocsa, where he can discreetly begin his theological studies, otherwise he threatened to deprive him of his office. In the same time, the pope rebuked King Andrew for misleading him with his "urgent requests" when, yielding to pressure, he appointed an uneducated man to be the "bishop of bishops" (i.e. archbishop).

=== Episcopal activity ===
Shortly after his return to Hungary in 1209, Berthold followed the path of his predecessor, John, and questioned the primacy jurisdiction of the Archdiocese of Esztergom, considering his archiepiscopal see as coequal. Taking advantage of his royal family connections, he sought to extort concessions and privileges for himself within the church hierarchy in Hungary against John, who this time was a defender of the interests of Esztergom. In response to Berthold's attacks, Archbishop John requested Pope Innocent to confirm his dignity's right of the coronation of the Hungarian monarch in 1209. Nevertheless, Berthold achieved partial success; a proposal for the compromise settlement of the resurgence of the quarrel was made by a committee of bishops belonging to the two archdioceses, which was presented to the pope by bishops Robert of Veszprém and Peter of Győr in 1211. The proposal contained that the right of coronation should belong to the role of archbishop Esztergom, except in case of deliberate rejection, obstacle, deteriorated health condition or sede vacante, when the process must be performed by the archbishop of Kalocsa. The so-called "second coronations" (during festive events) must be celebrated jointly. In addition, the document attached the collection of tithe after the coinage to Esztergom, but John had to waive his all right (i.e. superintendence over the royal churches, abbeys and provostries, ecclesiastical jurisdiction over the royal officials) in the territory of the church province of Kalocsa, in accordance with the proposal. The theses of the document was promoted by Andrew II himself too. However Pope Innocent, upon the complaint of the cathedral chapter of Esztergom, refused to countersign the document on 12 February 1212, referring to its "harmful consequences" for the Kingdom of Hungary.

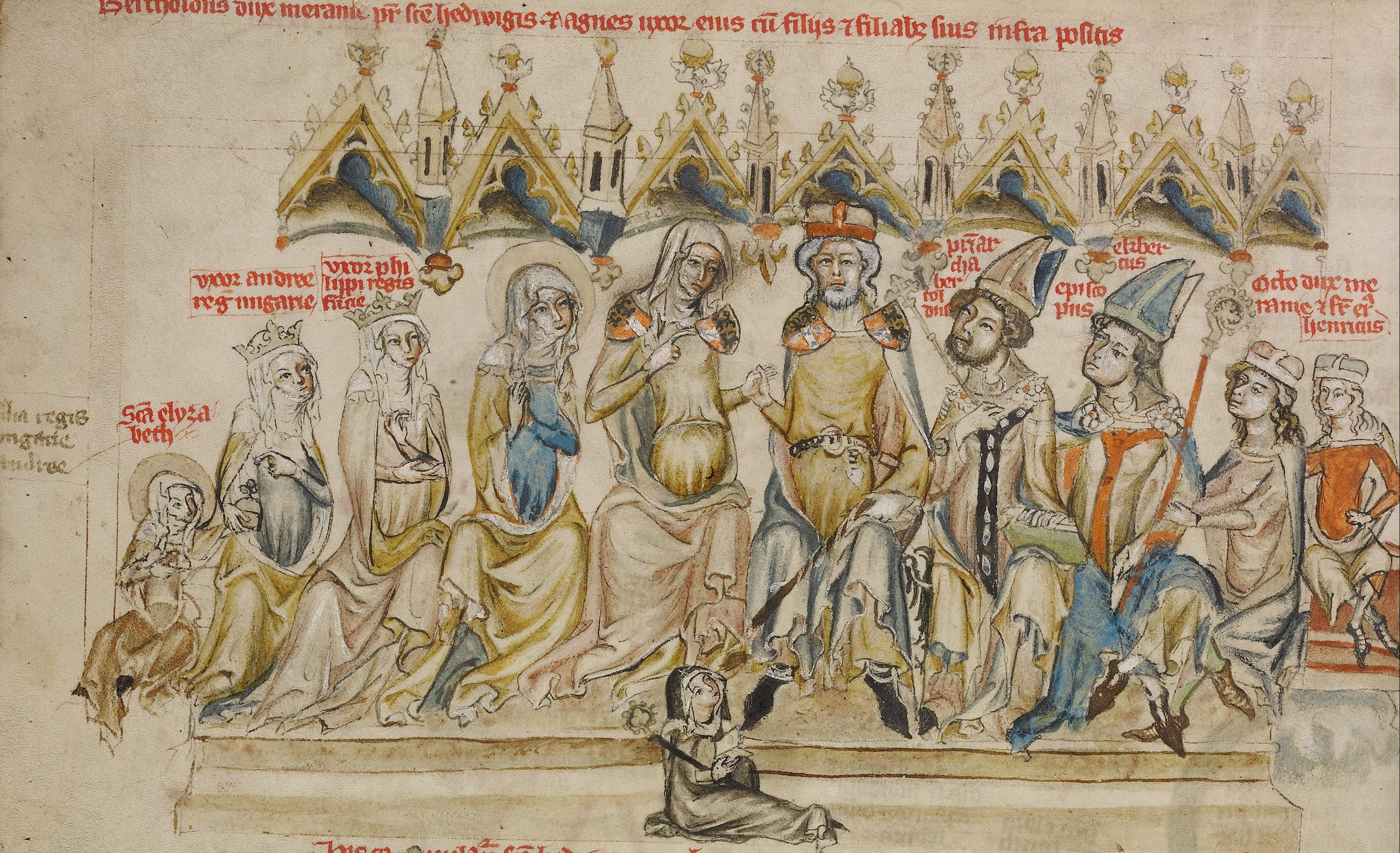
Berthold together with his parents and sisters (Hedwig Codex)

Berthold had important role in the settlement of the Teutonic Order to Transylvania in 1211. The area Burzenland (Hungarian: Barcaság), granted to the Teutonic Order by Andrew II in that year, belonged to the Diocese of Transylvania, a suffragan of the Archdiocese of Kalocsa. Berthold considered the settlement of the knights along the Southern Carpathians would have been a defense factor for his ecclesiastical province, which contributes to the political strengthening of Kalocsa in the conflict of jurisdiction against Esztergom. Berthold also sought to establish a separate Roman Catholic diocese for the Transylvanian Saxons and to launch missions in order to convert the Cumans. In this endeavor, he attempted to transform the provostship of Szeben (present-day Sibiu, Romania), which was established around 1189 in order to represent the Transylvanian Saxons and was not subject of the Diocese of Transylvania, into a bishopric within the ecclesiastical authority of Kalocsa. However, Pope Innocent III refused this plan; the pope argued that step would violate the rights of the Bishop of Transylvania, which obviously means that the new bishopric would have united all the German churches in Transylvania and the provostship of Szeben, which would have been the basis of the planned bishopric, was under the spiritual jurisdiction of either the Apostolic See or the Archbishop of Esztergom.

Berthold possibly rebuilt the Kalocsa Cathedral into Gothic style on the model of French cathedrals with ambulatory. The walls of the existing 11th-century cathedral were not used in the walls of the new church. Based on the consistency reflected in the stone carvings from the new building, art historian Imre Takács envisioned a rapid, almost campaign-like construction, which may prove that the renovation of the cathedral can be linked to the contemporary church policy rivalry between archbishops John of Esztergom and Berthold of Kalocsa. Berthold judged over various lawsuits involving the possessions – Sala (present-day Diakovce, Slovakia) and Dinnye – of the Pannonhalma Abbey in the period between 1211 and 1214. He also acted as an arbiter in the lawsuit between Bishop Robert of Veszprém and Uros of Pannonhalma regarding the collection right of tithes in Somogy County.

=== Rise and fall ===
As an unusual phenomenon in Hungary, Queen Gertrude applied for and received a share in the government system. Her favoritism towards her German entourage were aggrieved numerous Hungarian barons, who feared to permanently lose their court positions and influence. Berthold was the main beneficiary in this political situation. Despite his ecclesiastical career, he also held secular dignities, which was not a widespread practice in Hungary at that time. Replacing Bánk Bár-Kalán, Berthold served as Ban of Slavonia from 1209 to 1212. He was styled as "Dalmacie Croacieque dux" in this capacity in 1211. Thereafter, Berthold was made Voivode of Transylvania, serving from 1212 to 1213. He was also referred to as ispán of Bács and Bodrog counties in 1213. The influence of Berthold and his kinship shows, when provost Adolph was granted royal donation of lands upon the intercession of Gertrude and his brothers in 1209. It is plausible that Andrew II sent the provost to Altenburg to convince Otto IV, Holy Roman Emperor of the brothers' innocence in the case of the assassination of Philip of Swabia.

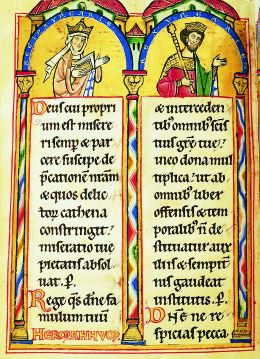
Berthold's patrons until 1213: his sister Queen Gertrude and brother-in-law King Andrew II of Hungary

When Andrew II prepared a military campaign to Galicia–Volhynia, he appointed his wife Queen Gertrude and Berthold as regents in early September 1213 during his absence. Andrew's generosity towards his wife's German relatives and courtiers discontented the local lords. Berthold's undue preference at the instigation of his sister disgusted the Hungarian magnates. On 28 September 1213, while the king marched into Galicia–Volhynia, a group of lords led by Peter, son of Töre dared a raid into a queen's hunting camp in the Pilis Mountains and murdered Gertrude and several of her courtiers, while Berthold – who was physically abused by the rebels – narrowly escaped his life with Leopold VI of Austria, according to the interpretation of historian Gyula Pauler. Only the Galician–Volhynian Chronicle confirms Berthold's presence during the assassination. Despite the doubtful authenticity of the chronicle's report, historian Tamás Körmendi accepted the information on Berthold's presence, since a letter of Pope Innocent III to Archbishop John of Esztergom in January 1214 refers to the assault on Berthold. According to the pope's letter, during the rebellion many clergy and monks in the Archdiocese of Kalocsa suffered physical insult and material damage. Innocent instructed John to excommunicate the perpetrators. In addition, the pope also sent a letter to the "dukes of Poland" not to give any refuge to the perpetrators who might flee abroad. When Andrew II heard of Gertrude's murder, he returned to Hungary and ordered the execution of Peter, son of Töre. Upon the request of Andrew II, bishops Peter of Győr and Robert of Veszprém escorted the unpopular and endangered Berthold until the Austrian border in late 1213, protected by the episcopal armies of Győr and Veszprém. However, Berthold took with him the treasures of his late sister, worth a total of 7,000 marks, which aroused the wrath of Andrew II, who complained this to the pope and threatened to indemnify the royal treasury from the proceeds of the archdiocese. The case may have been settled soon, because Bertold was able to return to Hungary in the first half of 1214.

Although Berthold returned to Hungary in 1214, King Andrew II certainly learning from previous experiences, no longer gave him as much political influence or territorial power as before. Berthold confirmed a donation letter of Stephen I, Bishop of Zagreb in 1215. Along with Archbishop John and several Hungarian suffragans, Berthold participated in the Fourth Council of the Lateran in 1215. Returning Hungary, Berthold ordered a compulsory reading of the hagiography of Saint Stephen I of Hungary (written by Hartvik) in the churches of his archdiocese and his suffragans' sees with the pope's permission in the same year. Pope Honorius III, in 1216, confirmed Berthold's right to freely appoint rectors of those churches, which have no pastoral duties. The Hungarian monarch commissioned him to oversee the delivery of salt to the canons of Zagreb in Szeged in 1217. Before launching the Fifth Crusade, Andrew II entrusted his eldest son and heir Béla to Berthold in the first half of 1217. Berthold took his nephew, the 11-year-old Béla to Steyr in the Duchy of Austria. Other historians identified this castle with Stein ("Stahin") in the Holy Roman Empire (today Kamnik, Slovenia).

== Patriarch of Aquileia ==
=== Ghibelline prelate ===
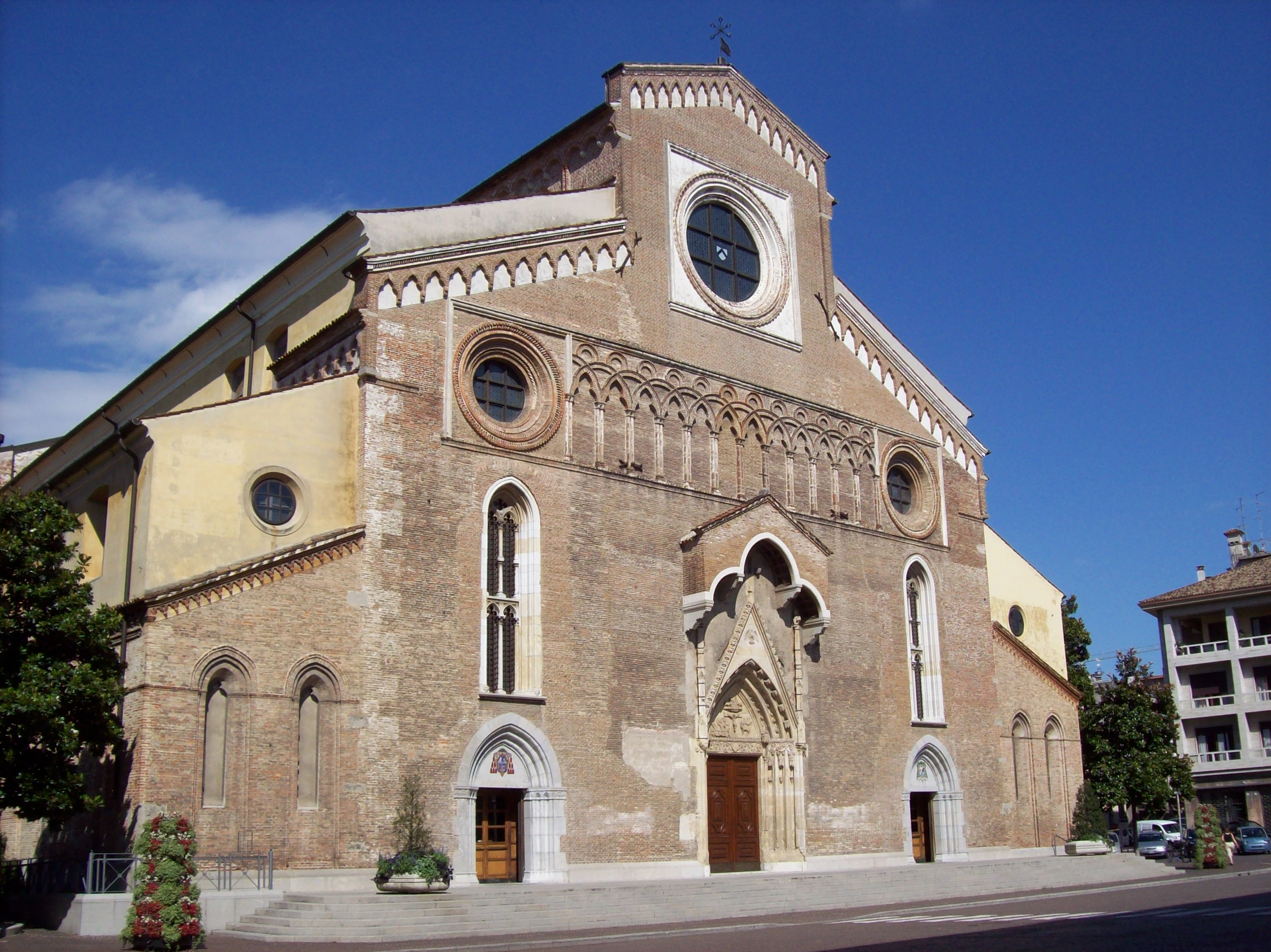
Berthold ordered the construction of Udine Cathedral after 1238

Following the death of Wolfger von Erla in January 1218, some members of the local cathedral chapter postulated Berthold as Patriarch of Aquileia, while others supported the election of Ulrich, a canon of the aforementioned chapter. Pope Honorius III investigated the case and declared and invalidated the postulation and the result of the election, citing a violation of canon law. He placed the task under his own authority and appointed Berthold as Patriarch of Aquileia on 27 March 1218. His transfer from Kalocsa to Aquileia took months. In July 1218, Pope Honorius instructed Archbishop and Patriarch-elect Berthold to consecrate "a bishop of Cumania". However, the establishment of the short-lived Roman Catholic Diocese of Cumania did not happen until a decade later under the guidance of Archbishop Robert of Esztergom. Berthold's appointment as Patriarch of Aquileia marked a significant advance in his church career, through which he was able to represent the interests of his family even more, as the patriarchate located in northeastern Italy, near their imperial fiefdom of the Duchy of Merania. During his patriarchy, he led several successful campaigns to consolidate his power against the County of Gorizia, Treviso and the rebellious Istria. He formed an alliance with Padua and the Republic of Venice in this process. He expanded the walled area of his capital, Cividale.

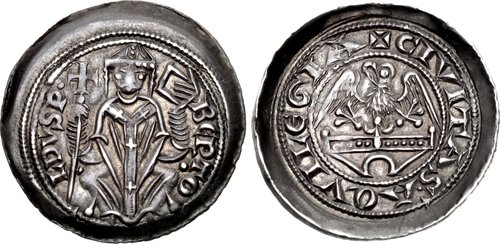
Coins of Patriarch Berthold

Berthold secured his position being a loyal supporter of the Hohenstaufen emperor Frederick II against the Italian cities of the Lombard League. He attended the papal coronation of Frederick II with the escort of 2,000 knights in Rome in November 1220. Berthold escorted the emperor to the Holy Land in the Sixth Crusade (1228–1229). He took part in the re-consecration of the Church of the Holy Sepulchre in Jerusalem in 1229. German historian Edmund von Oefele argued during the fierce conflict between the emperor and Pope Gregory IX, his loyalty to Frederick earned him a papal excommunication in 1229, which nevertheless was revoked two years later upon the intercession by King Andrew II of Hungary (other historians have differing views on the cause of excommunication, see below). As representative of the emperor, Berthold acted as one of the testimonies of the Treaty of San Germano in July 1230, where Frederick and Pope Gregory IX concluded peace. He also attended the imperial diet at Ravenna and hosted another one in Cividale in 1231–1232. Berthold hosted the negotiations between Frederick II and his rebellious son Henry (VII) in the spring of 1232. When Frederick II, Duke of Austria invaded the Kingdom of Bohemia in 1233, Berthold joined his army alongside his brothers and other imperial lords. Following the defeat of Henry, Frederick II entrusted Berthold to transport his captured son to Rocca San Felice in Apulia in 1235. After Emperor Frederick ostracized Frederick II, Duke of Austria from his realm due to his involvement in Henry's rebellion, brothers Berthold and Ekbert invaded the Duchy of Styria in 1236. They captured their own niece Agnes, Frederick's wife during the siege of Riegersburg Castle. Berthold was present in Vienna in early 1237, when the emperor obtained the title of King of the Romans for his 9-year-old son Conrad. In 1238 Agnes is found together with her uncle Berthold on the occasion of the colonization of the Michelstetten monastery in Carniola by Dominican nuns from Vienna (later Berthold mediated the wedding between Agnes and her second husband Ulrich of Sponheim).

Even after his appointment as patriarch, Berthold remained in contact with the Kingdom of Hungary. According to historian Gábor Barabás, Pope Gregory IX rebuked him in June 1229, as he hindered King Andrew II from fulfilling the promise of leading a crusade to the Holy Land. The pope sent a letter with a similar content and tone to Bishop Ekbert of Bamberg, Berthold's brother too. Pope Gregory temporarily even suspended and excommunicated the brothers. In contrast, historian Gergely Kiss considered the ecclesiastical punishments to Berthold and Ekbert were connected to the strained foreign relations between Hungary and Austria. According to a papal letter from 1229, Berthold visited the Hungarian royal court to dissuade Andrew II from participating in the conspiracy against Frederick II. In October 1234, Pope Gregory IX requested Berthold to seek the consent of his former brother-in-law Andrew II for the Teutonic Order's return to Transylvania (the knights were expelled from Hungary a decade earlier, who had attempted to eliminate Andrew's suzerainty in Burzenland) or at least compensate them for their losses.

=== Guelph turn ===
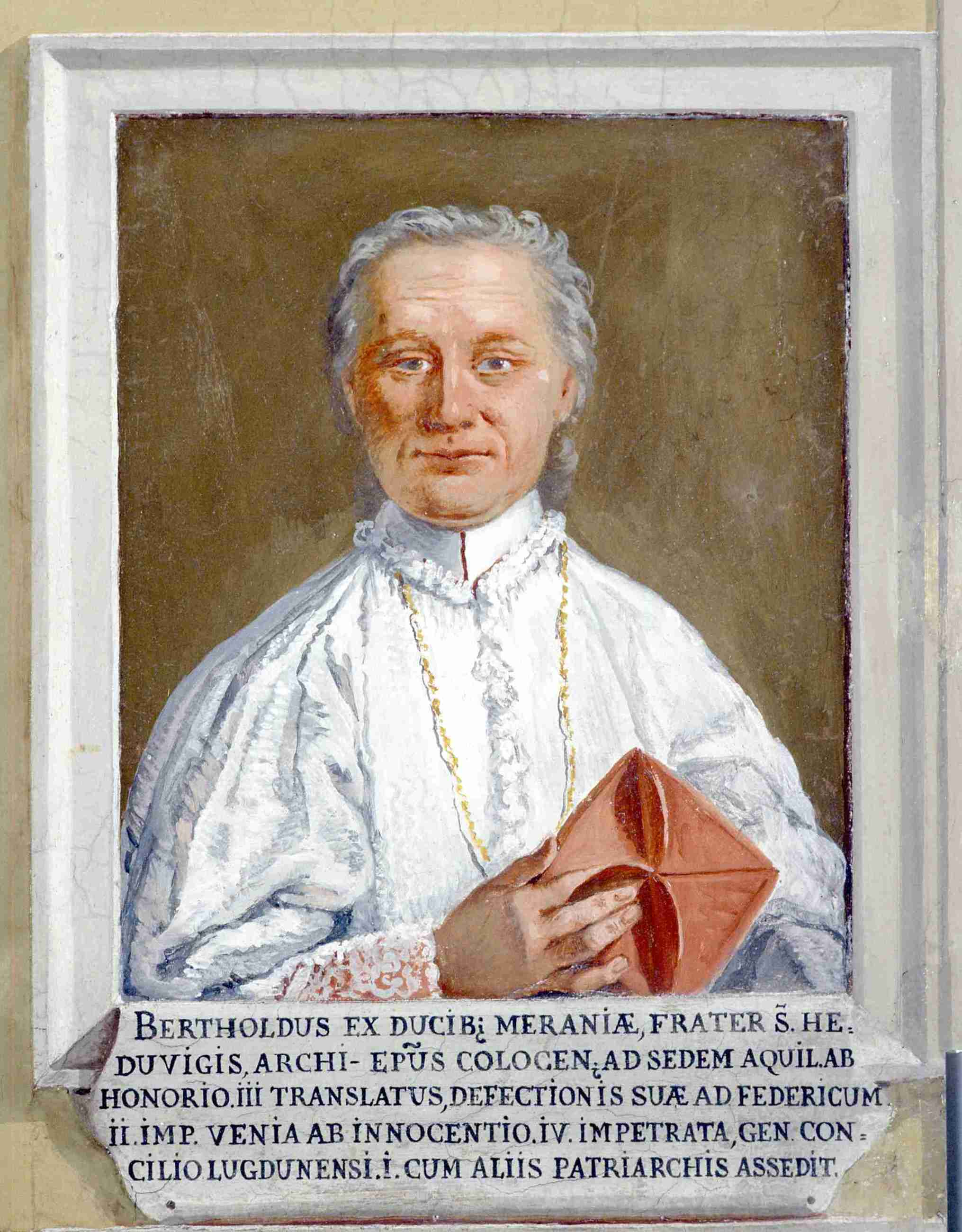
Portrait of Patriarch Berthold, located in Museo Diocesano e Gallerie del Tiepolo

In 1238 Berthold moved the capital of the ecclesiastical state from Cividale to Udine, where he gave orders to erect a cathedral. Under his leadership, the Patriarchate had a flourishing economy and cultural life, supported by a good road network. Udine in central Friuli, which had been a favourite residence of Berthold and his successors since the mid-13th century and soon became a large city. Berthold granted the right to hold trade fairs to Udine. During Berthold's rule, the Friulian parliament began to evolve out of ad hoc patriarchal councils of increasingly greater size, convoked first in 1231 to obtain the financial and military support of the Friulian barons in the near continual wars of patriarchs with their neighbours. Berthold granted various tax exemptions to the nobility of Friuli since 1245. Berthold sought to prevent the expansion of the cruel warlord Ezzelino III da Romano, who tried to expand his influence over Aquileia (or Friuli), despite the fact that both Berthold and Ezzelino were strong pillars of the pro-Emperor Ghibelline party.

Berthold was present in the Siege of Brescia in October 1238, where the Guelphs forced Frederick II to lift the siege. When Pope Gregory excommunicated the emperor in early 1239, Berthold was hesitant to announce the ecclesiastical censure in his patriarchate. Therefore, Berthold was excommunicated too. Berthold allied with Ezzelino in their joint campaign against Treviso, which rebelled against Frederick's rule. Berthold's nephews, King Béla IV of Hungary and Duke Coloman of Galicia requested the pope to absolve their maternal uncle from the excommunication. Gregory IX could not refuse the petition of what he described as "among the Christian rulers especially kind kings", though he had one condition, namely, that Berthold should appear before the papal court personally. The case of Berthold, however, did not come to a rapid conclusion despite Gregory's promise. The pope entrusted his subdeacon, Gregorio di Montelongo, to absolve the Berthold as early as January 1241. Soon, the advancing Mongols invaded Hungary then raided the Holy Roman Empire. Berthold gathered his troops and participated in the defense along the Austrian border, with several other lords and prelates. Berthold fled to Apulia in the spring of 1242. Together with the emperor, Berthold urged the newly crowned Pope Innocent IV to launch a crusade against the Mongols. Innocent entrusted the patriarch to lead a crusade into Hungary in July 1243. He was mandated with the same task in the First Council of Lyon in 1245, but in the end no campaign took place in either case. When negotiations with the emperor about the elevation of Vienna to a bishopric and of Austria (including Styria) to a kingdom were initiated by Duke Frederick in 1245, who succeeded in gaining the rule over the March of Carniola from the Patriarchate of Aquileia. The Austrian duke would have put Anselinus, Berthold's natural son, at the head of this new fiefdom. However, the Austrian–Bohemian and Austrian–Hungarian conflicts (the latter caused Frederick's death in 1246) prevented the implementation of this plan.

During the First Council of Lyon, Frederick II was excommunicated again. To get rid of his predicament and his fear of excommunication and political isolation, Berthold reconsidered his political allegiance and became increasingly distant from the emperor over the years, even after his nephew Otto II died in 1248, which resulted the expiration of the Duchy of Merania. In his later years, Berthold tried to arbitrate between the emperor and the pope, though ultimately to no avail. Berthold entered into a defense alliance with the neighboring city-states of Brescia, Mantua and Ferrara in order to repel a possible punitive campaign of Frederick II. The emperor entrusted Meinhard, Duke of Carinthia to confiscate all of Berthold's possessions in Styria and Carinthia.

Following the abolition of the Duchy of Merania, Berthols established large-scale domains to the patriarchate, for instance Windischgrätz (present-day Slovenj Gradec, Slovenia). Berthold died in Aquileia on 23 May 1251. He was buried in the Basilica di Santa Maria Assunta. With Berthold's death, his line of the counts of Andechs became extinct. He was also the last in a long line of German Patriarchs of Aquileia. His successor Gregorio di Montelongo had led a Guelph coalition against Emperor Frederick II.

== Legacy ==
The Austrian Rhymed Chronicle ("Chronicon rhythmicum Austriacum") is the earliest known work, which preserved the alleged story of that Berthold raped the wife of a powerful lord Bánk Bár-Kalán, which was the immediate cause of the assassination of his sister, Queen Gertrude, who acted as a procuress in the adultery, in September 1213. The chronicle was compiled by a Hungarian cleric in Klosterneuburg Abbey, Lower Austria around 1270. Its text was utilized by the Dominican Annals of Vienna ("Annales Praedicatorum Vindobonensium") at the end of the 13th century, but Berthold is anachronistically styled as Patriarch of Aquileia. The 14th-century Illuminated Chronicle ("Chronicon Pictum") took over the story too, claiming that one of Gertrude's brothers raped Bánk's wife, but does not mention Berthold by name. The involvement of the story made a decisive contribution to making the story rooted in the Hungarian chronicle and historiographical tradition and, subsequently, the Hungarian-language literature and culture.

The chronicle of the family monastery, the Dießen Abbey took over the story, but it denies the responsibility of Gertrude, as well as three Bavarian authors in the 15th-century, namely Andreas of Ratisbon's Chronkon universale, Ulrich Onsorg's Chronicon Bavariae and Veit Arnpeck's Chronicon Baioariorum. All four works agree that Berthold forced a Hungarian noblewoman to commit adultery with him.

Berthold donated two codices to the cathedral chapter of Cividale, the Egbert Psalter (Psalterium Egberti) and the St. Elizabeth's Psalm (she was the daughter of Gertrude and niece of Berthold).

== Sources ==
- Barabás, Gábor (2015). A pápaság és Magyarország a 13. század első felében. Pápai hatás – együttműködés – érdekellentét [The Papacy and Hungary in the First Half of the 13th Century. Papal influence – cooperation – clash of interests] (in Hungarian). Pécsi Történettudományért Kulturális Egyesület. ISBN 978-963-89482-5-0.
- Dissaderi, Massimo; Casadio, Paolo. "Andechs-Merania (di) Bertoldo (?–1251)" (in Italian). Dizionario Biografico dei Friulani.
- Kiss, Gergely (2014). "Meránia és Aquileia között. Berthold kalocsai érsek pályafutásának egyházkormányzati tanulságai [Between the Duchy of Merania and the Patriarchate of Aquileia. The Career of Berthold of Andechs-Meran, Archbishop of Kalocsa and Its Consequences on the Hungarian Church Administration]". In Majorossy, Judit (ed.). Egy történelmi gyilkosság margójára. Merániai Gertrúd emlékezete, 1213–2013 (in Hungarian). Ferenczy Museum, Szentendre. pp. 87–94. ISBN 978-963-9590-77-9.
- Koszta, László (2013). A kalocsai érseki tartomány kialakulása [The Development of the Archdiocese of Kalocsa] (in Hungarian). Pécsi Történettudományért Kulturális Egyesület. ISBN 978-963-89482-2-9.
- Körmendi, Tamás (2014). "A Gertrúd királyné elleni merénylet körülményei [The Circumstances of the Murder of Queen Gertrude]". In Majorossy, Judit (ed.). Egy történelmi gyilkosság margójára. Merániai Gertrúd emlékezete, 1213–2013 (in Hungarian). Ferenczy Museum, Szentendre. pp. 95–124. ISBN 978-963-9590-77-9.
- Körmendi, Tamás (2019). Az 1196–1235 közötti magyar történelem nyugati elbeszélő forrásainak kritikája [A Criticism of Western Narrative Sources for the History of Hungary in the period between 1196 and 1235] (in Hungarian). MTA Bölcsészettudományi Kutatóközpont Történettudományi Intézet. ISBN 978-963-416-163-9.
- Markó, László (2006). A magyar állam főméltóságai Szent Istvántól napjainkig: Életrajzi Lexikon [Great Officers of State in Hungary from King Saint Stephen to Our Days: A Biographical Encyclopedia] (in Hungarian). Helikon Kiadó. ISBN 963-547-085-1.
- Oefele, Edmund von (1875). "Berthold von Andechs" . Allgemeine Deutsche Biographie (in German). Vol. 2. Leipzig: Duncker & Humblot. pp. 516–518.
- Rudolf, Veronika (2023). Közép-Európa a hosszú 13. században [Central Europe in the Long 13th Century] (in Hungarian). Arpadiana XV., Research Centre for the Humanities. ISBN 978-963-416-406-7.
- Udvardy, József (1991). A kalocsai érsekek életrajza (1000–1526) [Biographies of Archbishops of Kalocsa, 1000–1526] (in Hungarian). Görres Gesellschaft.
- Zsoldos, Attila (2011). Magyarország világi archontológiája, 1000–1301 [Secular Archontology of Hungary, 1000–1301] (in Hungarian). História, MTA Történettudományi Intézete. ISBN 978-963-9627-38-3.

Berthold (patriarch of Aquileia) House of Andechs Born: c. 1182 Died: 23 May 1251
Catholic Church titles
Preceded by John	Archbishop of Kalocsa; 1206–1218	Succeeded by Ugrin Csák
Preceded by Wolfger von Erla	Patriarch of Aquileia; 1218–1251	Succeeded by Gregorio di Montelongo
Political offices
Preceded by Bánk Bár-Kalán	Ban of Slavonia; 1209–1212	Succeeded by Michael Kacsics
Preceded by Michael Kacsics	Voivode of Transylvania; 1212–1213	Succeeded by Nicholas II
