= Berthold of Merania =

Meranian nobleman (1159–1204)

Berthold IV of Andechs
- Duke of Merania
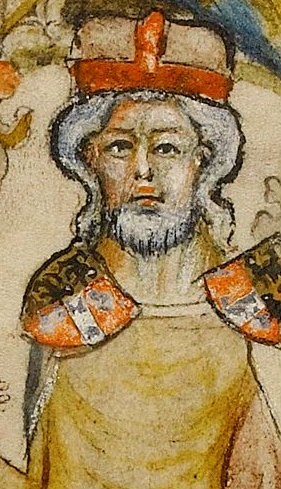
- Born: c. 1159
- Died: 12 August 1204
- Buried: Dießen Abbey
- Noble family: Andechs
- Spouse: Agnes of Rochlitz
- Father: Berthold I of Istria
- Mother: Hedwig of Wittelsbach

Berthold IV (c. 1159 – 12 August 1204), a member of the House of Andechs, was Margrave of Istria and Carniola (as Berthold II). By about 1180/82 he assumed the title of Duke of Merania, referring to the Adriatic seacoast of Kvarner which his ancestors had conquered in the 1060s and annexed to Istria and Carniola.

== Life ==
Berthold was the son of Count Berthold III of Andechs and his wife Hedwig of Wittelsbach. His father had been a loyal vassal of Emperor Frederick Barbarossa and in turn was enfeoffed with the Istrian march upon the death of the Sponheim margrave Engelbert III.

Young Berthold IV first appeared in 1170 and was mentioned as Count of Andechs in an 1172 deed. In 1175 he served as co-ruler in the March of Istria. After Emperor Frederick deposed Duke Henry the Lion in 1180, his maternal uncle Otto of Wittelsbach received the Duchy of Bavaria, while Berthold received the Duchy of Merania. The rule over the self-styled "Merania" actually encompassed the same area as the old Istrian margraviate, and did not constitute a separate administrative or political entity; however, its ruler gained prestige from his new ducal title, and the comital House of Andechs was elevated to Princes of the Holy Roman Empire.

In 1186, he accompanied Emperor Frederick's son Henry VI to Italy and his marriage with Constance of Sicily. In 1189, he led the third division of the imperial army and was its standard-bearer on the Third Crusade, in which he led the Crusaders with Frederick VI, Duke of Swabia in the Battle of Philomelion in 1190. In 1195, he appeared as Vogt (reeve) of Tegernsee Abbey in Bavaria. Berthold committed himself to join the Crusade of 1197, however, he did not participate until Henry's death in the same year. Though he had opposed the emperor's Erbreichsplan, he backed the claims of Henry's younger brother Philip of Swabia against the politics of Pope Innocent III who supported Philip's Welf rival Otto IV. At this juncture, the House of Andechs was at the height of its power and influence, with extended possessions stretching from Franconia down to the Adriatic.

Berthold died in 1204 and was buried at the Andechs private monastery in Dießen, Bavaria.

== Marriage and issue ==
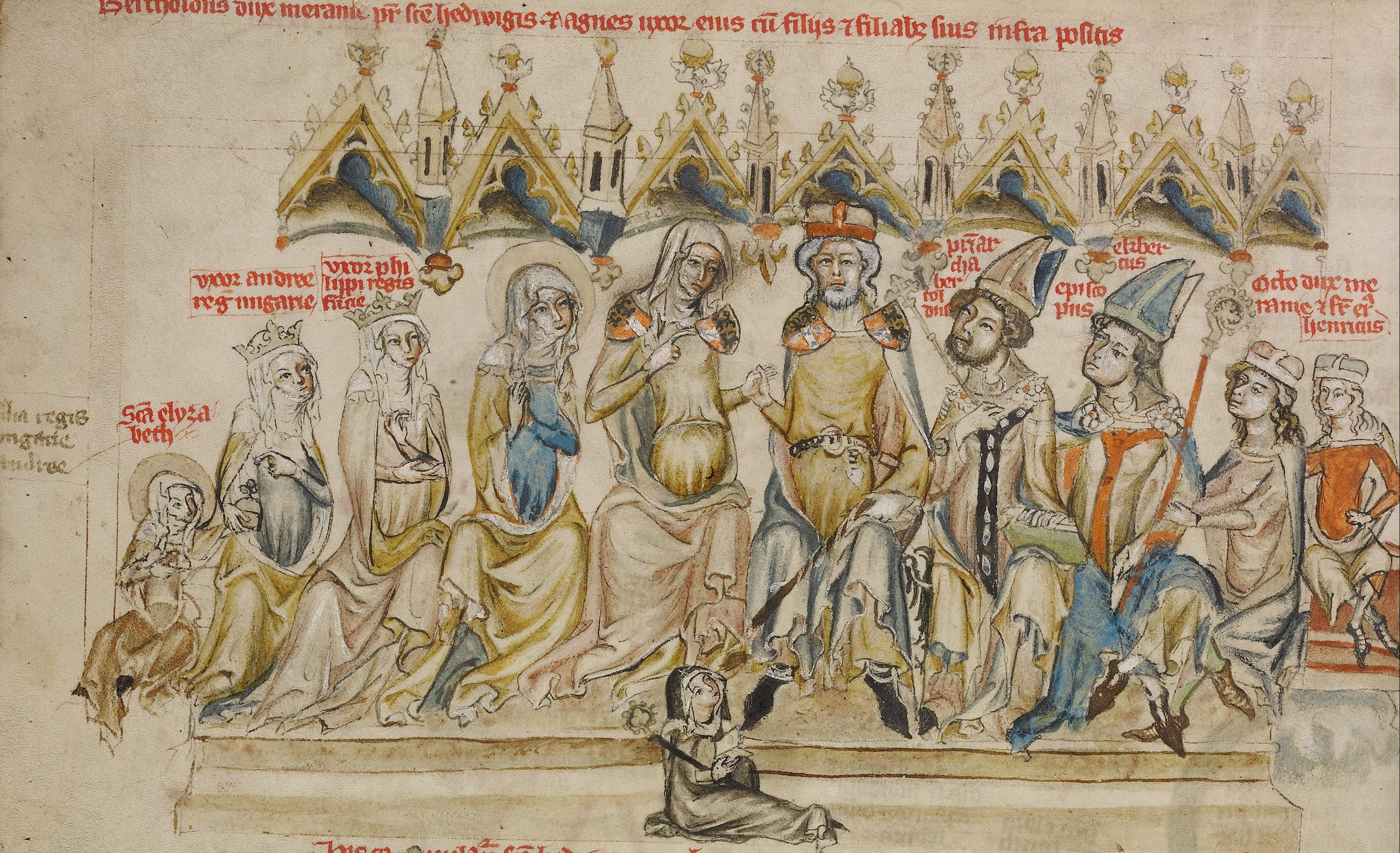
Berthold, Agnes and their family, Hedwig Codex, 1353

About 1180, Berthold married Agnes of Rochlitz, a daughter of Margrave Dedi III of Lusatia from the Saxon House of Wettin. They had:

- Otto I (d. 1234), succeeded his father as Duke of Merania, married Beatrice II of Hohenstaufen, daughter of Count Otto I of Burgundy, became Count palatine of Burgundy in 1211
- Ekbert (d. 1237), Bishop of Bamberg from 1203, guardian of his nephew Otto II from 1234
- Henry II (d. 1228), Margrave of Istria and Carniola from 1204, married Sophia of Weichselburg, heiress of the estates in the Windic March and Metlika
- Hedwig (1174–1243), married Henry I the Bearded, Duke of Silesia, became High Duchess of Poland in 1232, canonized by the Catholic Church in 1267
- Gertrude (d. 1213), married Andrew II, became Queen of Hungary in 1205, murdered
- Agnes (d. 1201), married King Philip II of France and became French consort in 1196, repudiated in 1200
- Berthold (d. 1251), Archbishop of Kalocsa from 1206, Patriarch of Aquileia from 1218

While passing through Serbia on the Third Crusade, Frederick Barbarossa met the Grand Prince Stefan Nemanja in Niš on 27 July 1189. There it was negotiated that a daughter of Berthold would marry Tohu, son of Prince Miroslav of Zahumlje on the feast of Saint George next (24 April 1190). This marriage does not seem to have taken place and the Historia de Expeditione Friderici Imperatoris does not name the daughter. Scholars are divided over whether it was one of Berthold's known daughters or else a fifth daughter not otherwise recorded.

== Sources ==
- Arnold, Benjamin (2003). Princes and Territories in Medieval Germany. Cambridge University Press. ISBN 9780521521482.
- Loud, G. A., ed. (2010). The Crusade of Frederick Barbarossa: The History of the Expedition of the Emperor Frederick and Related Texts. Ashgate.
- Lyon, Jonathan (2013). Princely Brothers and Sisters: The Sibling Bond in German Politics, 1100–1250. Ithaca and London: Cornell University Press.
- Newman, Martha G. (2020). Cistercian Stories for Nuns and Monks. University of Pennsylvania Press.

Berthold of Merania House of Andechs Died: 12 August 1204
Preceded by Conrad II	Duke of Merania; 1185–1204	Succeeded by Otto I
Preceded by Berthold I	Margrave of Istria and Carniola; 1188–1204	Succeeded by Henry II
