= Agnes of Rochlitz =

Duchess consort of Merania (1152–1195)

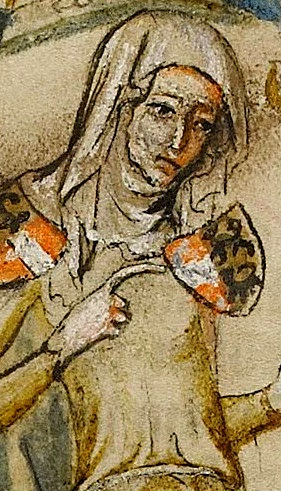
- Died: 1195
- Noble family: Wettin
- Spouse: Berthold IV, Duke of Merania
- Issue: Otto I; Ekbert; Henry; Hedwig; Gertrude; Agnes; Berthold; Matilda
- Father: Dedi III, Margrave of Lusatia
- Mother: Matilda of Heinsburg

Agnes of Rochlitz (died 1195) came from the Wettin family and was daughter of Dedi III, Margrave of Lusatia and his wife, Matilda of Heinsburg. She is also known as Agnes of Wettin.

Agnes married Berthold IV, Duke of Merania. From this marriage Agnes gained the titles of Duchess of Merania and Countess of Andechs.

In 1186, Agnes' husband accompanied Henry VI, Holy Roman Emperor, to the Kingdom of Sicily. In 1189, he led the third division of the imperial army and was its standard-bearer on the Third Crusade.

== Issue ==
Agnes and Berthold had:

- Otto I, who succeeded his father
- Ekbert, Prince-Bishop of Bamberg
- Henry, margrave of Istria
- Saint Hedwig, wife of Henry I the Bearded, duke of Silesia
- Gertrude, who married Andrew II of Hungary
- Agnes, disputed consort of Philip II of France
- Berthold, Patriarch of Aquileia

== Sources ==
- Oliver of Paderborn (1971). Peters, Edward (ed.). Christian Society and the Crusades, 1198-1229: Sources in Translation. Translated by Gavigan, John J. University of Pennsylvania Press.
