= Gertrude of Merania =

Queen consort of Hungary

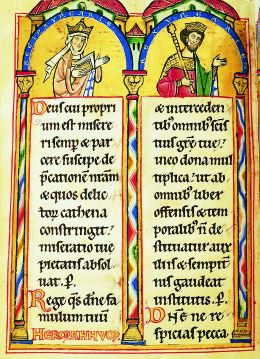
- Gertrude and Andrew, Landgrafenpsalter, Thuringia, c. 1213

Queen consort of Hungary
- Tenure: 1205–1213
- Born: c. 1185
- Died: 28 September 1213 (aged 27–28)
- Burial: Pilis Abbey, Budapest, Hungary
- Spouse: Andrew II of Hungary
- Issue: Anna Maria, Empress of Bulgaria; Béla IV of Hungary; Saint Elizabeth of Hungary; Coloman of Lodomeria; Andrew II of Halych
- House: Andechs
- Father: Berthold IV, Duke of Merania
- Mother: Agnes of Rochlitz

Gertrude of Merania (c. 1185 – 28 September 1213) was Queen of Hungary as the first wife of Andrew II from 1205 until her assassination. She was regent during her husband's absence.

== Life ==
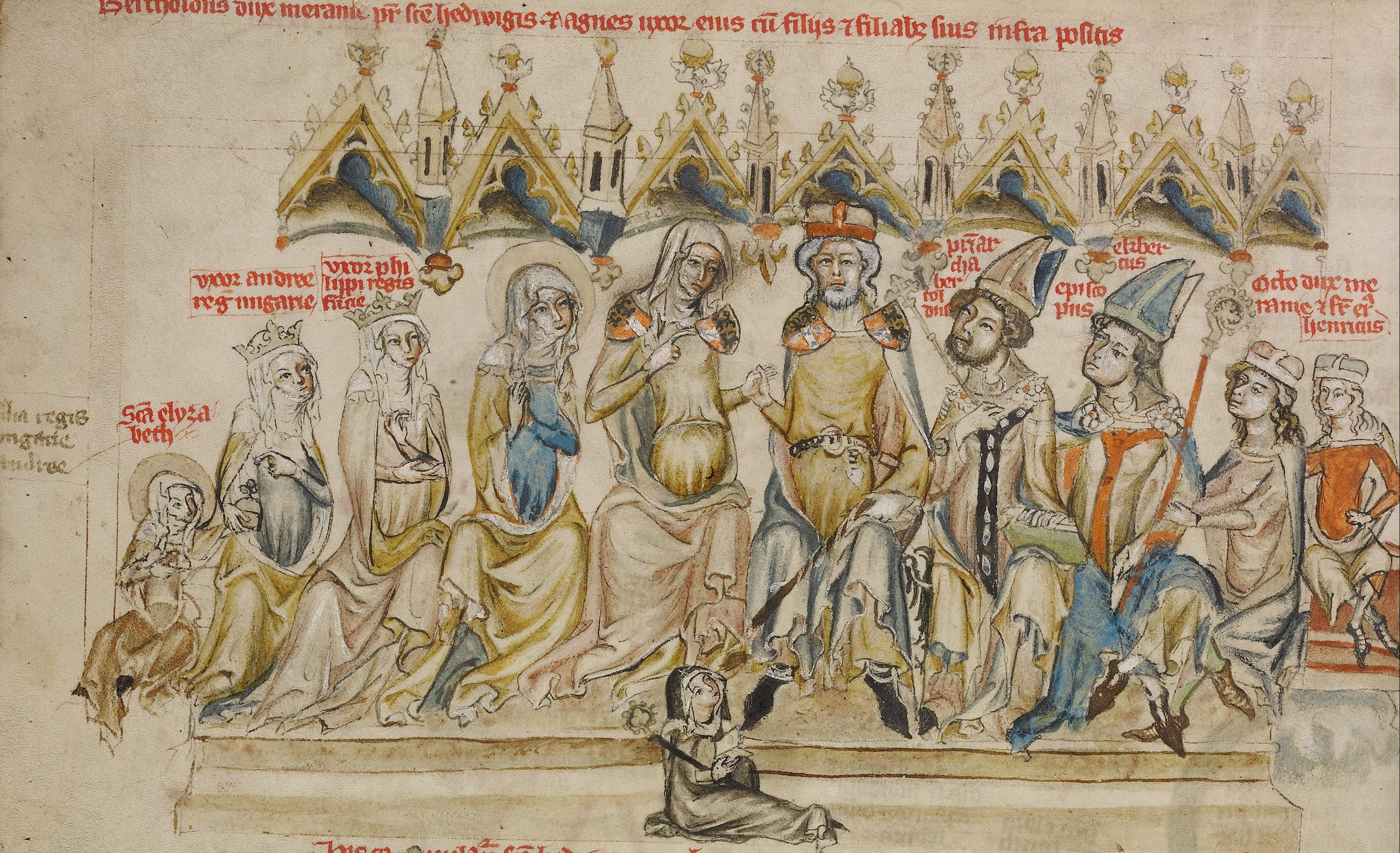
Berthold IV of Andechs and his wife Agnes among their children

Gertrude was the daughter of the Bavarian Count Berthold IV of Andechs, Margrave of Carniola and Istria, and his wife Agnes from the Saxon House of Wettin. Gertrude's elder sister was Agnes of Merania, a famous beauty, who married King Philip II of France. Her younger sister was St. Hedwig of Silesia, wife of the Piast duke Henry I the Bearded, the later High Duke of Poland. Their brothers were Otto, who inherited the title of Duke of Merania and succeeded their father in his Bavarian domains, Henry who took over the rule in Carniola and Istria, and Berthold who became a close advisor to Gertrude and was named Archbishop of Kalocsa.

== Marriage ==
Gertrude's parents arranged political marriages for their daughters, creating alliances for her father, Duke Berthold. Gertrude married the Árpád prince Andrew II, younger son of late King Béla III of Hungary, before 1204. Andrew thereby took sides in the conflict over the German throne, joining his father-in-law in his support of Duke Philip of Swabia, while his elder brother King Emeric of Hungary backed King Otto IV of Germany.

They had:

- Anna Maria of Hungary (c. 1204 – 1237), wife of Tzar Ivan Asen II of Bulgaria
- King Béla IV of Hungary (1206 – 3 May 1270)
- Saint Elizabeth of Hungary (1207 – 10 November 1231), wife of Landgrave Louis IV of Thuringia
- King Coloman of Galicia-Lodomeria (1208 – June 1241)
- Prince Andrew II of Halych (c. 1210 – 1234)

=== Queen ===
Ambitious Gertrude exerted much political influence over her husband. It was probably she who persuaded Andrew to conspire against his brother again, but when King Emeric, who had realised that Andrew's troops outnumbered his armies, went unarmed, wearing only the crown and the sceptre, to Andrew's camp near Varasd, Andrew surrendered voluntarily in the spur of the moment. The king had his brother arrested, but Andrew managed to escape shortly afterwards. During this time, Gertrude was sent back to her father. Things improved for her, when Prince Andrew took over the government of the Hungarian kingdom upon the death of King Emeric in 1204, officially as regent for his minor nephew Ladislaus III, who nevertheless died in exile one year later.

=== Regent ===
While the king was in battle, Gertrude gave out Hungarian land as "gifts" to her favorites. According to medieval chroniclers, one third of the country was given away but the magnates got it back after the queen's death. Thus, Hungary did not prosper. During the frequent absence of her husband, the queen was regent and, as Dietrich of Apolda states, conducted the affairs of the kingdom "like a man". In 1206, her younger brother Berthold was installed as Archbishop of Kalocsa. In 1212, he was also appointed Voivode of Transylvania.

== Death ==
While King Andrew was campaigning in Galicia, a Hungarian noble, Peter, son of Töre, decided to assassinate the queen and in 1213, on a hunt with Berthold and their guest Duke Leopold VI of Austria in the Pilis Mountains, she was killed. Gertrude's body was torn to pieces, while her brother and Duke Leopold narrowly escaped with their lives. According to recent research, the perpetrator could have been a serious lone criminal with a personal motive. It raises questions, e.g. why would the royal bodyguard allow a man armed with a sword into the queen's sleeping tent. Contrary to the previously widespread view, it is now known that when the king found out about his wife's murder, he brutally executed justice and impaled the perpetrator. His son, King Béla IV, used the killing of his mother decades later for political showdowns, accusing non-genuine accomplices of earlier involvement.

Gertrude's tomb was of a Gothic style. Her tomb was excavated between 1967 and 1980.

On Gertrude's death, Andrew married Yolanda de Courtenay.

== In culture ==
Gertrude is the main antagonist in both József Katona's play, Bánk bán (1819) and the opera (1861) of the same name composed by Ferenc Erkel. They are fictionalized retellings of the assassination, in which the noble men of Hungary conspire against Queen Gertrude (called Gertrudis in the play and the opera) who exploited the people of Hungary as a regent and let them live in fear and poverty, while she herself was throwing feasts in the royal palace and giving titles and estates to her Meranian friends and relatives. The noble men only wait for the approval of Bánk bán, the most powerful among them, who is resistant to join. However, upon learning that Otto, Gertrude's brother, drugged and raped his wife Melinda with the tacit approval of the queen, he breaks into the bed chamber of Gertrude at night and confronts her, which leads to a heated argument ending in the murder of the queen.

This story is strongly fictionalized and likely very inaccurate, as there are no reliable sources on the details of the assassination. There is no proof that Gertrude was an exploitative or negligent regent, and although Bánk bán was a real historical person, there's no evidence that he was the one who murdered the queen and no records of him having a wife. Among Gertrude's brothers, it wasn't Otto, the Duke of Merania, but Berchtold, the Archbishop of Kalocs, who lived with her in Hungary and counseled her. Some sources written well after the events accuse him of seducing or raping Melinda, but such accusations could not be written about a priest in 1820, when the play was first published.

The play and the opera quickly became favorites in Hungary, which was under the rule of the Austrian Habsburg dynasty, and national sentiments were strongly discouraged, while any straightforward criticism against the sovereign or the royal family was impossible because of the strict censorship rules.

== Sources ==
- Lyon, Jonathan R. (2013). Princely Brothers and Sisters: The Sibling Bond in German Politics, 1100-1250. Cornell University Press.
- Mielke, Christopher (2021). The Archaeology and Material Culture of Queenship in Medieval Hungary, 1000–1395. Palgrave Macmillan.
- Newman, Martha G. (2020). Cistercian Stories for Nuns and Monks: The Sacramental Imagination of Engelhard of Langheim. University of Pennsylvania Press.
- Van Tricht, Filip (2011). The Latin Renovatio of Byzantium: The Empire of Constantinople (1204-1228). Translated by Longbottom, Peter. Brill.
- Wolf, Kenneth Baxter, ed. (2010). The Life and Afterlife of St. Elizabeth of Hungary: Testimony from her Canonization Hearings. Oxford University Press.

Gertrude of Merania House of Andechs Born: 1185 Died: 1213
Royal titles
Preceded by Constance of Aragon	Queen consort of Hungary; 1205–1213	Succeeded by Yolanda de Courtenay
