= Andreas of Ratisbon =

Andreas of Ratisbon (sometimes Andreas of Regensburg) was a historian of the later 14th and early 15th century. All that is known concerning him is gathered from the scanty particulars given in his works. He was ordained priest at Eichstätt in 1405, and joined the Canons Regular of St. Augustine at Ratisbon in 1410, where he devoted himself to historical studies. His principal works are De statu urbis Ratisbon, antiquo et de variis Haeresibus, the Chronicon Generale and the Chronicon de Ducibus Bavariae, to 1439, which gained him the title of the "Bavarian Livy", and which he afterwards translated into German, and continued to 1452. He is the principal forerunner of the famous Bavarian historiographer, Aventinus.
