= Counts of Andechs =

Noble family

Andechs
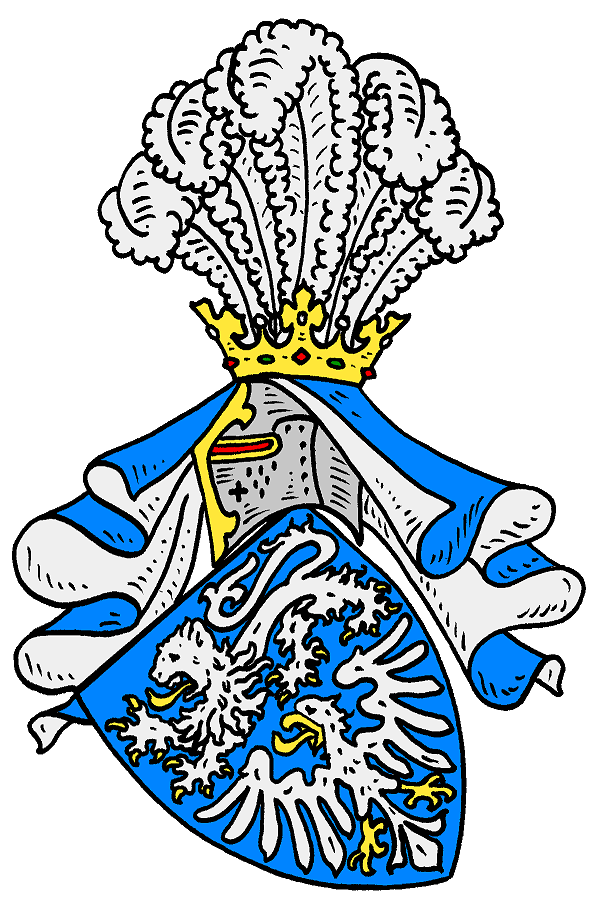
- Country: Duchy of Austria; March of Carniola; Kingdom of Croatia (under Hungary)
- Founded: 1100
- Current head: Ludwig Jozef, Duke of Dießen-Andechs
- Titles: Duke of Dießen-Andechs; Margrave of Istria; Duke of Merania

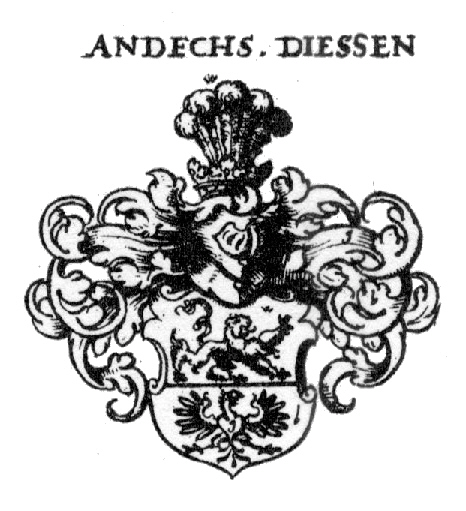
Coat of arms of Andechs Diessen

The House of Andechs was a feudal line of German princes in the 12th and 13th centuries. The counts of Dießen-Andechs (1100 to 1180) obtained territories in northern Dalmatia on the Adriatic seacoast, where they became Margraves of Istria and ultimately dukes of a short-lived imperial state named Merania from 1180 to 1248. They were also self-styled lords of Carniola.

== History ==
The noble family originally resided in southwestern Bavaria at the castle of Ambras near Innsbruck, controlling the road to the March of Verona across the Brenner Pass, at Dießen am Ammersee and Wolfratshausen. One Count Rasso (Rath) is documented in Dießen, who allegedly fought against the invading Magyars in the early 10th century and established the monastery of Grafrath. By their ancestor Count Palatine Berthold of Reisensburg, a grandson of the Bavarian duke Arnulf the Bad, the Andechser may be affiliated with the Luitpolding dynasty. Berthold appears a fierce enemy of King Otto I of Germany and was blamed as a traitor at the 955 Battle of Lechfeld against the Hungarians. He probably married a daughter of Duke Frederick I of Upper Lorraine; his descendant Count Berthold II (d. 1151), from about 1100 residing at Andechs, is credited as the progenitor of the comital dynasty.

Berthold II had inherited the family's Bavarian territories but also acquired possessions in the adjacent Franconian region, where about 1135 he had the Plassenburg built near Bayreuth and established the town of Kulmbach. He served as vogt of Benediktbeuern Abbey and by marriage with Sophie, daughter of Margrave Poppo II, came into property of lands in the March of Istria and Carniola.

In the year 1180, the County of Andechs acquired the town of Innsbruck.

Otto II of Andechs was bishop of Bamberg from 1177 to 1196. In 1208, when Philip of Swabia, King of the Germans, was assassinated at Bamberg by Otto VIII of Wittelsbach, members of the House of Andechs were implicated.

Saint Hedwig of Andechs (c. 1174 – October 1243) was one of eight children born to Berthold IV, Duke of Merania, Count of Dießen-Andechs and Margrave of Istria. Of her four brothers, two became bishops: Ekbert of Bamberg (1203–1231), and Berthold, Patriarch of Aquileia.

Otto succeeded his father as Duke of Dalmatia, and Henry became Margrave of Istria. Of her three sisters, Gertrude of Andechs-Merania (1185 – 28 September 1213) was the first wife of Andrew II of Hungary and the mother of St Elizabeth of Hungary; Mechtilde became Abbess of Kitzingen; while Agnes, a famous beauty, was made the illegitimate third wife of Philip II of France in 1196, on the repudiation of his lawful wife, Ingeborg, but was dismissed in 1200, after Pope Innocent III laid France under an interdict.

A history of the House of Andechs was written by the statesman and historian Joseph Hormayr, Baron zu Hortenburg, and published in 1796.
