= Conrad II of Swabia =

German nobleman (1172–1196)

Conrad II
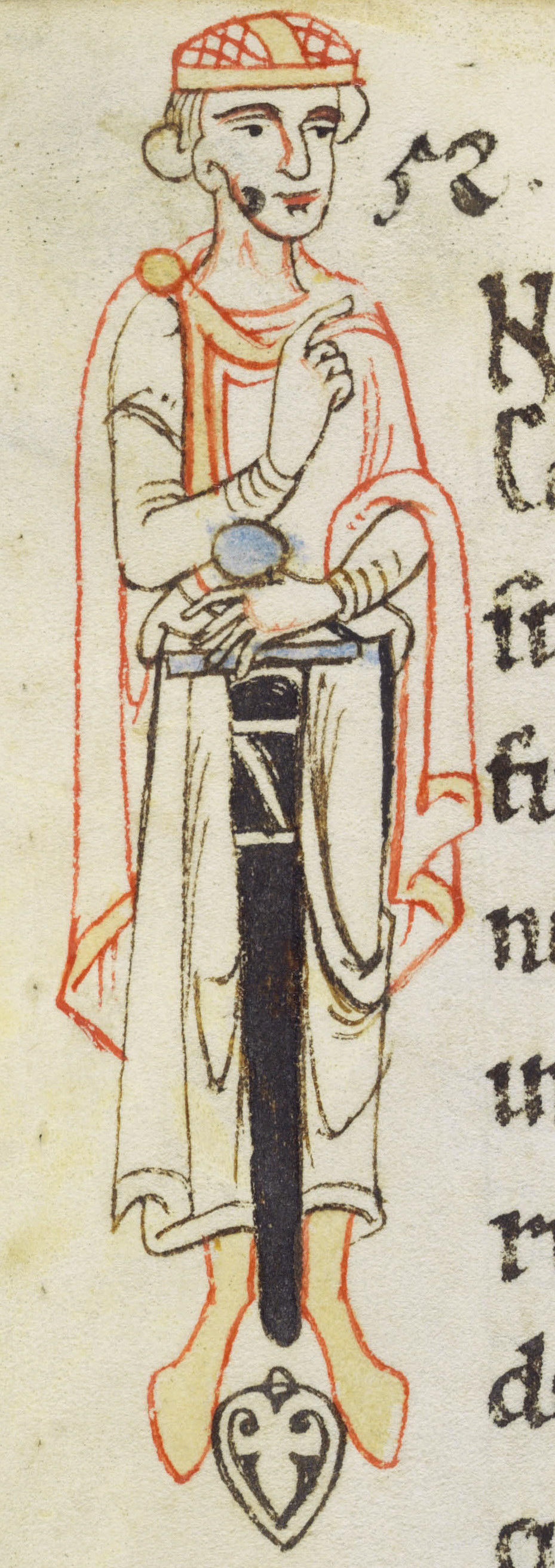
- Conrad II, Duke of Swabia (miniature around 1200)

Duke of Swabia
- Reign: 20 January 1191 – 15 August 1196
- Predecessor: Frederick VI
- Successor: Philip
- Born: February/March 1172
- Died: 15 August 1196 (aged 24); Durlach
- Spouse: Berengaria of Castile (m. 1187)
- House: House of Hohenstaufen
- Father: Frederick I Barbarossa
- Mother: Beatrice I, Countess of Burgundy

Conrad II (February/March 1172 – 15 August 1196), was Duke of Rothenburg (1188–1191) and Swabia from 1191 until his death. He was the fifth son of Frederick I Barbarossa and Beatrice I, Countess of Burgundy.

== Life ==
After the third-born son of the Emperor, who was originally called Conrad, had been renamed Frederick around 1170, this first name, which had a long tradition in the Staufen dynasty, had been freed up for a younger son.

Conrad was invested by his father with the Franconian domains which reverted to the German crown after the death of Frederick IV, Duke of Swabia in 1167; this certainly happened at the latest in 1188 when he was first referred to as dux de Rotenburch (Duke of Rothenburg). In addition, the young prince also received the lands of Weißenburg and Eger.

On 23 April 1188 Emperor Frederick I Barbarossa and King Alfonso VIII of Castile signed the Treaty of Seligenstadt, under which was arranged the betrothal between Conrad —son of the German Emperor— and Berengaria —eldest and only surviving child of the Castilian King, and thus the heiress presumptive of her father. Conrad then marched to Castile, where in Carrión de los Condes the engagement was celebrated and he was knighted in July 1188, making him a servant of his new lord and future father-in-law, King Alfonso VIII. Berengaria's status as heiress of Castile was based in part on documentation in the treaty and marriage contract, which specified that she would inherit the Castilian throne after her father or any childless brothers who may come along. Conrad would only be allowed to co-rule as her spouse, and Castile would not become part of the Holy Roman Empire. Furthermore, he was not allowed to claim the throne for himself in case of Alfonso VIII's death but was obliged to defend and protect the kingdom until Berengaria would arrive in case of her absence. The treaty also documented traditional rights and obligations between the future sovereign and the nobility.

The wedding was never solemnized, due to the bride's young age. In addition, Conrad and Berengaria never saw each other: on Christmas Day of 1190, according to the marriage contract, Berengaria was supposed to arrive in Germany, but this did not happen. Pope Celestine III did not want the Staufen dynasty to extend its influence over the Iberian Kingdoms, and when in the autumn of 1191 Berengaria (influenced, no doubt, by third parties such as her grandmother Eleanor of Aquitaine, who was not interested in having a Staufen as a neighbor to her French fiefdoms), requested an annulment of the engagement, the Pope quickly agreed: the betrothal was broken in early 1192 by the Archbishop Gonzalo of Toledo and the Papal Legate Gregor, Cardinal-Deacon of San Angelo, on the grounds that the bride was against the continuation of the engagement.

Conrad joined the army under the leadership of his oldest brother Henry VI, Holy Roman Emperor in traveling to Rome for Henry VI's imperial coronation on 15 April 1191. After the coronation, the army set out to the invasion of the Kingdom of Sicily. Due to the malaria epidemic that broke out in August 1191, the campaign was stopped in Naples. Documents issued in Italy indicate that Conrad took part in this campaign.

Conrad's older brother Frederick VI, Duke of Swabia died in January 1191 at Acre during the Third Crusade. According to the chronicle of Otto of Sankt Blasien in 1191, Henry VI left the Duchy of Swabia to his brother Conrad after returning from Italy. The chronicler also described Conrad as "a man thoroughly given to adultery, fornication, defilement, and every foulness; nevertheless, he was vigorous and brave in battle and generous to his friends."

In a royal charter dated 24 May 1192, when he is said to have received his sword tail at a court in Worms, he appears for the first time as dux Suevie (Duke of Swabia) and from then on his previous title of Duke of Rothenburg was not used.

During the Italienzug of Henry VI in 1194–95 Conrad seems to have stayed away and acted as the King's deputy in Swabia and Franconia. This emerges from documents from Salem and Steingaden Abbeys, which were issued by Conrad during this period.

== Death ==
Conrad died aged 24, a very young age even by medieval standards. The Marbach Annals date Conrad's death to 15 August 1196. His early death prevented him from succeeding his brother Henry VI, who died in Messina just one year later in September 1197. Instead, his youngest surviving brother Philip succeeded him as Duke of Swabia and in 1198 became the next king from the Staufen dynasty.

According to the chronicle of Burchard of Ursperg, Conrad died in Durlach during a campaign against Berthold V, Duke of Zähringen and was buried at Lorch Abbey. This chronicle is uncertain whether he was killed by a woman whom he had raped or by her husband. But the Annals of Konrad von Scheyern recorded specifically that he was bitten in the left nipple by a girl he was attempting to rape; although an increasingly large wound developed, he did not want to be treated and died three days later. Other reports stating that he died in Oppenheim and was buried in Speyer are considered inaccurate.

Conrad's burial place, Lorch Abbey, was the necropolis of the Staufen dynasty, donated by his great-grandfather, Frederick I, Duke of Swabia. In 1475 Abbot Nikolaus Schenk von Arberg had the remains of all the Staufen buried in Lorch transferred to a late Gothic tumba, which is now in the central nave of the Lorch Abbey church.

== See also ==
- Dukes of Swabia family tree

== Notes ==
Preceded by Frederick VI	Duke of Swabia; 1191–1196	Succeeded by Philip
