= Frederick VI of Swabia =

Duke of Swabia

Frederick VI
- Duke of Swabia
- Contemporary representation of Frederick VI in the Historia Welforum, around 1179–1191.

Duke of Swabia
- Reign: 28 November 1170 – 20 January 1191
- Predecessor: Frederick V
- Successor: Conrad II
- Born: February 1167; Modigliana
- Died: 20 January 1191 (aged 23); Acre
- House: House of Hohenstaufen
- Father: Frederick I Barbarossa
- Mother: Beatrice I, Countess of Burgundy

Frederick VI of Hohenstaufen (February 1167 – 20 January 1191) was Duke of Swabia from 1170 until his death at the siege of Acre.

== Life ==
Frederick VI of Hohenstaufen was born in Modigliana in the Italian region of Emilia-Romagna. He was the third son of Frederick Barbarossa and Beatrice I of Burgundy. Originally named Conrad, he took the name of Frederick after the death of his eldest brother Duke Frederick V of Swabia in 1170. He also succeeded him as duke of Swabia.

In the older literature, Conrad/Frederick VI's older brother and predecessor Duke Frederick V of Swabia was partly overlooked, because he was thought to be identical to Conrad/Frederick VI, and for this reason he was not counted as Frederick VI but as Frederick V. The fact that a younger brother born in 1172, the later Conrad II, Duke of Swabia, was given the name Conrad creates additional confusion when identifying these three sons of Frederick Barbarossa.

Frederick Barbarossa appointed the noble Degenhard von Hellenstein as Prokurator (Governor) for the Duchy of Swabia while his son was underage. In 1179 the emperor granted to Frederick VI, in addition to the Duchy of Swabia, some areas acquired in Upper Swabia and Bavaria on the basis of contracts of inheritance with Welf VI and Count Rudolf of Pfullendorf. For the first a lion was found on a Hohenstaufen coat of arms in a seal of Frederick VI dated around 1181. This design was in also in a 1220 seal of Duke Henry of Swabia, later Staufen King Henry (VII) of Germany. The extended version of this seal with a three-lion crest was currently part of the Coat of arms of Baden-Württemberg.

In 1181, Frederick VI was betrothed to a seven-years-old daughter of King Valdemar I of Denmark, whose identity is uncertain. After the brother of the bride and new King Canute VI of Denmark refused to give half of her dowry, the emperor decided to send the princess (who had been living in Germany for five years at the time in preparation for her marriage) back to Denmark in 1187 still a virgin (lat: intacta). The Danish princess could be Ingeborg —whose assumed birth year was around 1175 and would fit with the repudiated child bride—, who later had an unhappy marriage with King Philip II of France.

At the Diet of Pentecost in Mainz on 20 May 1184, Frederick VI, together with his brother King Henry VI of Germany personally received the accolade from their father. The emperor's sons and many princes, who followed their example and did not want to be inferior to them in this respect, gave the knights and minstrels gifts in the form of horses, precious clothes, gold and silver. This was followed by a riding event called gyrum, at which the knights showed their skills in swinging shields, banners and lances. Among the alleged 20,000 participants were the emperor and his sons. The next day the riding events continued. In the following week fighting games were to take place in Ingelheim. However, a storm caused several tents and the wooden church to collapse and also caused deaths among the celebrants. This was interpreted as a divine sign and the celebration was not continued.

On 27 March 1188, Frederick VI made a solemn oath to join his father on the Third Crusade. On 11 May 1189, he set out with the Crusader army from Regensburg. In his journey he arrived to the Kingdom of Hungary, where he was betrothed to Constance, a daughter of King Béla III, an ally of Barbarossa. Frederick VI's early death in the Crusade prevented the marriage from proceeding; some years later, in 1198, Constance became in the second wife of King Ottokar I of Bohemia.

As part of his father's army, Frederick VI commanded the van while Barbarossa commanded the rearguard. Upon hearing his father's troops were under attack, he rushed back on horseback with his troops to reinforce them. However, he also had an important role at both the Battle of Philomelion and Battle of Iconium in May 1190. Following his father's death on 10 June 1190 in the Saleph River in the Armenian Kingdom of Cilicia, Frederick VI took command of the German forces and led them south towards Antioch. Although a large number of the Crusaders left the army and sailed from Antioch to their homeland, Frederick VI wanted to move to Jerusalem with his remaining army. In Tripoli, a large part of his companions became ill on malaria, which is why only around 700 knights arrived with him in early October 1190 to besiege the city of Acre. While at Acre, Frederick VI wrote his brother, Henry VI, asking for him to gain papal recognition for the hospital at Acre. Having also been stricken with malaria, Frederick VI died on 20 January 1191 and was buried in Acre. Due to Acre remaining occupied by Saladin's troops at that time, the remaining crusaders were unable to enter the city and left the Holy Land after Frederick VI's death.

== See also ==
- Dukes of Swabia family tree

== Sources ==
- Baaken, Gerhard (1968). "Die Altersfolge der Söhne Friedrich Barbarossas und die Königserhebung Heinrichs VI". Deutsches Archiv für Erforschung des Mittelalters (in German). Vol. 24. pp. 46–78.
- Decker-Hauff, Hansmartin (1977). "Das Staufische Haus". Württembergisches Landesmuseum (Hrsg.): Die Zeit der Staufer. Geschichte - Kunst - Kultur.. Vol. III. Stuttgart. pp. 339–374.
- Engels, Odilo (1998). Die Staufer (in German). Stuttgart: W. Kohlhammer. ISBN 3-17-015157-6. OCLC 31801217.
- Hosler, John D. (2018). The siege of Acre, 1189-1191 : Saladin, Richard the Lionheart, and the battle that decided the Third Crusade. New Haven. ISBN 978-0-300-23535-7. OCLC 1041140126.
- Maurer, Helmut (1978). Der Herzog von Schwaben. Grundlagen, Wirkungen und Wesen seiner Herrschaft in ottonischer, salischer und staufischer Zeit. Sigmaringen. pp. 268–300.
- Nicholson, Helen J. (2004). Medieval warfare : theory and practice of war in Europe, 300-1500. Houndmills, Basingstoke, Hampshire: Palgrave Macmillan. ISBN 1-4039-4386-9. OCLC 191933340.
- Paul Friedrich von Stälin (1878). "Friedrich V., Herzog von Schwaben" . Allgemeine Deutsche Biographie (in German). Vol. 8. Leipzig: Duncker & Humblot. p. 35.
- Hansmartin Schwarzmaier (1961). "Friedrich V". Neue Deutsche Biographie (in German). Vol. 5. Berlin: Duncker & Humblot. pp. 590–591. (.html full text online).
- Hansmartin Schwarzmaier (1989). "Friedrich V. (Konrad), Herzog von Schwaben (1167–1191)". Lexikon des Mittelalters, IV: Erzkanzler bis Hiddensee (in German). Stuttgart and Weimar: J. B. Metzler. col. 960–961. ISBN 3-7608-8904-2.
- Sterns, Indrikis (1985). "The Teutonic Knights in the Crusader States". In Zacour, Norman P.; Hazard, Harry W. (eds.). A History of the Crusades: The Impact of the Crusades on the Near East. Vol. V. The University of Wisconsin Press.
- Weller, Tobias (2004). Die Heiratspolitik des deutschen Hochadels im 12. Jahrhundert (in German). Köln. pp. 100–102 and 130–136.

Preceded by Frederick V	Duke of Swabia; 1170–1191	Succeeded by Conrad II
