= Battle of Philomelion (1190) =

Battle of the third crusade (1190)

Coordinates: 38°21′27″N 31°24′59″E

- Part of the Third Crusade
| Date | 7 May 1190 |
| Location | Philomelion, Anatolia (modern-day Akşehir, Konya, Turkey) |
| Result | Crusader victory |

Belligerents
| Holy Roman Empire; Duchy of Bohemia | Sultanate of Rûm |

Commanders and leaders
| Frederick VI, Duke of Swabia; Berthold, Duke of Merania; Děpolt II | Kaykhusraw I Muhyiddin Mesut |

Strength
| 2,000 | 10,000 |

Casualties and losses
| Unknown | 4,174–5,000 killed |

The Battle of Philomelion (Philomelium in Latin, Akşehir in Turkish) was a victory of the forces of the Holy Roman Empire over the Turkish forces of the Sultanate of Rûm on 7 May 1190 during the Third Crusade.

In May 1189, Holy Roman Emperor Frederick Barbarossa began his expedition to the Holy Land as part of the Third Crusade to recover the city of Jerusalem from the forces of Saladin. After an extended stay in the European territories of the Byzantine Empire, the Imperial army crossed over to Asia at the Dardanelles from 22–28 March 1190. After surmounting opposition from Byzantine populations and Turkish irregulars, the Crusader army was surprised in camp by a 10,000-man Turkish force of the Sultanate of Rûm near Philomelion on the evening of 7 May. The Crusader army counterattacked with 2,000 infantry and cavalry under the leadership of Frederick VI, Duke of Swabia and Berthold, Duke of Merania, putting the Turks to flight and killing 4,174–5,000 of them.

== Background ==
Pope Gregory VIII called for a crusade to restore the city of Jerusalem to Christian hands after its loss to Saladin in 1187 and to help the remaining crusader strongholds in the Holy Land. Holy Roman Emperor Frederick Barbarossa, a veteran of the Second Crusade, took up the Cross at the Curia Christi (court of Christ) in Mainz Cathedral on 27 March 1188 and was the first to set out for the Holy Land in May 1189 with an army of 12,000–15,000 men, including 4,000 knights.

After marching through Hungary, Serbia, Bulgaria and the Byzantine Empire, the Imperial army crossed over the Dardanelles to Anatolia by 28 March 1190. The Anatolian plateau was held by the Seljuk Sultanate of Rûm. The passage of the Crusader army provoked armed resistance from the local Byzantine populations in Anatolia. The Crusaders' horses suffered from a lack of grasslands.

Having secured in advance Turkish promises of safe transit and the preparation of markets for the Crusader army, Frederick's troops were surprised by hit-and-run Turkish attacks on them upon entering Turkish territory. A Turkish attack on the Imperial camp was defeated on 30 April, with 500 Turks killed. On 2 May, the Crusaders defeated another Turkish attack and killed 300 Turks. The next day, the Imperial soldiers were ambushed by the Turks and hit with arrows and rocks. A knight named Werner was killed while Frederick VI, Duke of Swabia was wounded along with nine other knights. The Crusaders climbed up a mountain to reach the ambushers and killed sixty of them. They then proceeded to massacre Turkish women and small children in a fertile lowland area. The Minnesänger Friedrich von Hausen died on 6 May, having accidentally fallen from his horse while pursuing fleeing Turkish troops.

== Battle ==
The Crusaders camped near the city of Philomelion on 7 May. The Turks believed the Imperials to be completely exhausted from hunger and attacked the camp with 10,000 cavalry and infantry in the evening. The attack was accompanied by missile fire and stones. The Crusader army sallied forth from the camp with 2,000 men, with the infantry followed by the cavalry. The Crusaders were led by Frederick VI, Duke of Swabia and Berthold, Duke of Merania. The Turks were completely routed and the survivors were saved only by nightfall and the mountainous terrain.

== Aftermath ==
The Crusaders passed Philomelion on 8 May, their ranks thinned by hunger. Turkish attacks continued. On 9–10 May, the Crusaders killed 64 Turkish soldiers and on 11 May about 250 Turks, mostly horse archers, were added to the score. On 12 May, the Crusaders crossed a narrow bridge that left them highly vulnerable, but the Turks interfered only minimally, with 20 Turks slain that day. The crusaders continued their march until they reached the Seljuk capital city of Iconium on 13 May, where a major battle would be fought on 18 May.

=== Casualties ===
The Turks lost 4,174 killed according to the Turks' own body count of their fallen later on. The bodies of another 600 dead could not be recovered. A Crusader estimate put the Turkish death toll at 5,000.
