= Frederick Barbarossa =

Holy Roman Emperor from 1155 to 1190

- Imperator Romanorum
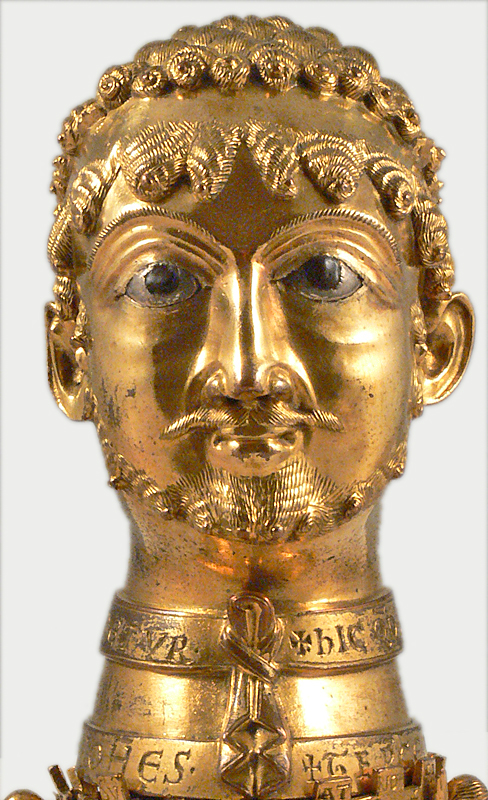
- A golden bust of Frederick as John the Baptist, given to his godfather Count Otto of Cappenberg in 1171. It was used as a reliquary in Cappenberg Abbey in Germany, and is said in the deed of the gift to have been made "in the likeness of the emperor".

Holy Roman Emperor
- Reign: 1155 – 10 June 1190
- Coronation: 18 June 1155, Rome
- Predecessor: Lothair III
- Successor: Henry VI

King of Italy
- Reign: 1155 – 10 June 1190
- Coronation: 24 April 1155, Pavia
- Predecessor: Conrad III
- Successor: Henry VI

King of the Romans King of Germany
- Reign: 4 March 1152 – 10 June 1190
- Coronation: 9 March 1152, Aachen
- Predecessor: Conrad III
- Successor: Henry VI

King of Burgundy
- Reign: 1152 – 10 June 1190
- Coronation: 30 June 1178, Arles

Duke of Swabia
- Reign: 6 April 1147 – 4 March 1152
- Predecessor: Frederick II
- Successor: Frederick IV
- Born: Mid-December 1122; Likely Hagenau, Duchy of Swabia, Holy Roman Empire
- Died: 10 June 1190 (aged 67); Saleph, Cilician Armenia
- Burial: Church of St. Peter, Antioch, Turkey (flesh); Cathedral of the Holy Cross, Tyre (bones); Saint Paul's Church, Tarsus, Turkey (heart and inner organs)
- Spouses: Adelheid of Vohburg (m. 1147; ann. 1153) Beatrice I, Countess of Burgundy (m. 1156; died 1184)
- Issue more...: Frederick V, Duke of Swabia; Henry VI, Holy Roman Emperor; Frederick VI, Duke of Swabia; Otto I, Count of Burgundy; Conrad II, Duke of Swabia; Philip, King of Germany
- House: Hohenstaufen
- Father: Frederick II, Duke of Swabia
- Mother: Judith of Bavaria

Frederick Barbarossa (December 1122 – 10 June 1190), also known as Frederick I (German: Friedrich; Italian: Federico), was the Holy Roman Emperor from 1155 until his death in 1190. He was elected King of Germany in Frankfurt on 4 March 1152 and crowned in Aachen on 9 March 1152. He was crowned King of Italy on 24 April 1155 in Pavia and emperor by Pope Adrian IV on 18 June 1155 in Rome. Two years later, the term sacrum ("holy") first appeared in a document in connection with his empire. He was later formally crowned King of Burgundy, at Arles on 30 June 1178. His nickname of Barbarossa (meaning "Red Beard" in Italian) "was first used by the Florentines only in 1298 to differentiate the emperor from his grandson, Frederick II ... and was never employed in medieval Germany" (the colour red was "also associated in the Middle Ages with malice and a hot temper"; in reality, Frederick's hair was "blond", although his beard was described by a contemporary as "reddish"). In German, he was known as Kaiser Rotbart, which in English means "Emperor Redbeard". The prevalence of the Italian nickname, even in later German usage, reflects the centrality of the Italian campaigns under his reign, and "remains to this day one of the [most] powerful historical monikers."

Frederick was by inheritance Duke of Swabia (1147–1152, as Frederick III) before his imperial election in 1152. He was the son of Duke Frederick II of the Hohenstaufen dynasty and Judith, daughter of Henry IX, Duke of Bavaria, from the rival House of Welf. Frederick, therefore, descended from the two leading families in Germany, making him an acceptable choice for the Empire's prince-electors. Frederick joined the Third Crusade and opted to travel overland to the Holy Land. In 1190, Frederick drowned attempting to cross the Saleph River, leading to most of his army abandoning the Crusade before reaching Acre.

Historians consider him among the Holy Roman Empire's greatest medieval emperors. He combined qualities that made him appear almost superhuman to his contemporaries: his longevity, his ambition, his extraordinary skills at organization, his battlefield acumen, and his political perspicacity. His contributions to Central European society and culture include the re-establishment of the Corpus Juris Civilis, or the Roman rule of law, which counterbalanced the papal power that had dominated the German states since the conclusion of the Investiture controversy. Due to his popularity and fame, in the 19th and early 20th centuries, he was used as a political symbol by many movements and regimes: the Risorgimento, the Wilhelmine government in Germany (especially under Emperor Wilhelm I), and the Nazi movement (Operation Barbarossa, Barbarossa decree) resulting in mixed legacies.

== Biography ==
=== Early life ===
Frederick was born to Duke Frederick II of Swabia and Judith of Bavaria in mid-December 1122. While his birthplace is not definitely known, it was likely Hagenau, then in the Duchy of Swabia of the Holy Roman Empire and today in France. His mother was from the Welf family, and his father was from the Hohenstaufen family, the two most powerful families in the empire. The Hohenstaufens were often called Ghibellines, which derives from the Italianized name for Waiblingen castle, the family seat in Swabia; the Welfs, in a similar Italianization, were called Guelfs. Frederick was also a descendant of the Salian dynasty through his paternal grandmother Agnes as she was the daughter of Emperor Henry IV and Bertha of Savoy. He also had ties to the Ottonian dynasty through his mother Judith as she hailed from Emperor Otto II and his wife Theophanu. Therefore, Frederick carried on the bloodline of Emperor Otto the Great and his wives, Eadgyth and Adelaide. He learned to ride, hunt and use weapons at an early age, but could neither read nor write, and was also unable to speak the Latin language until later in life. He took part in several Hoftage during the reign of his uncle, King Conrad III, which were a form of informal and irregular assembly popular among the empire's nobles. One took place in 1141 in Strasbourg, another in 1142 in Konstanz, 1143 in Ulm, 1144 in Würzburg and 1145 in Worms.

=== Second Crusade ===
In early 1147, Frederick decided to join the Second Crusade after his uncle, Conrad III of Germany, had taken the crusader vow in public on 28 December 1146. Frederick's father, Duke Frederick II, strongly objected to this and according to Otto of Freising, the duke berated his brother for permitting his son to go. The elder Frederick, who was dying, expected his son to look after his widow and younger half-brother once he had passed on, not risk his life by going on a crusade. Perhaps in preparation for the crusade, Frederick married Adelaide of Vohburg sometime before March 1147. His father died on 4 or 6 April and Frederick succeeded him as the Duke of Swabia. The German crusader army departed from Regensburg seven weeks later.

In August 1147, while crossing the Byzantine Empire, an ill crusader stopped in a monastery outside Adrianople to recuperate. There he was robbed and killed. Conrad ordered Frederick to avenge him. The duke of Swabia razed the monastery, captured and executed the robbers and demanded they return the stolen money. The intervention of the Byzantine general Prosuch prevented further escalation. A few weeks later, on 8 September, Frederick and Welf VI were among the few German crusaders who survived when a flash flood destroyed the main camp. They had decided to encamp on a hill a ways away from the main army. The remains of the army reached Constantinople the following day.

Conrad III attempted to lead the army across Anatolia but finding this too difficult in the face of constant Seljuk Turks attacks near Dorylaeum, decided to turn back. The rearguard was subsequently annihilated. Conrad sent Frederick ahead to inform King Louis VII of France of the disaster and ask for help. The two armies, French and German, then advanced together. When Conrad fell ill around Christmas in Ephesus, he returned to Constantinople by ship with his personal retinue, which included Frederick. With Byzantine ships and money, the German army once again left Constantinople on 7 March 1148 and arrived in Acre on 11 April. After Easter, Conrad and Frederick visited Jerusalem, where Frederick was impressed by the charitable works of the Knights Hospitaller. He took part in the council of Acre on 24 June, where a decision was reached that the crusaders would attack Damascus.

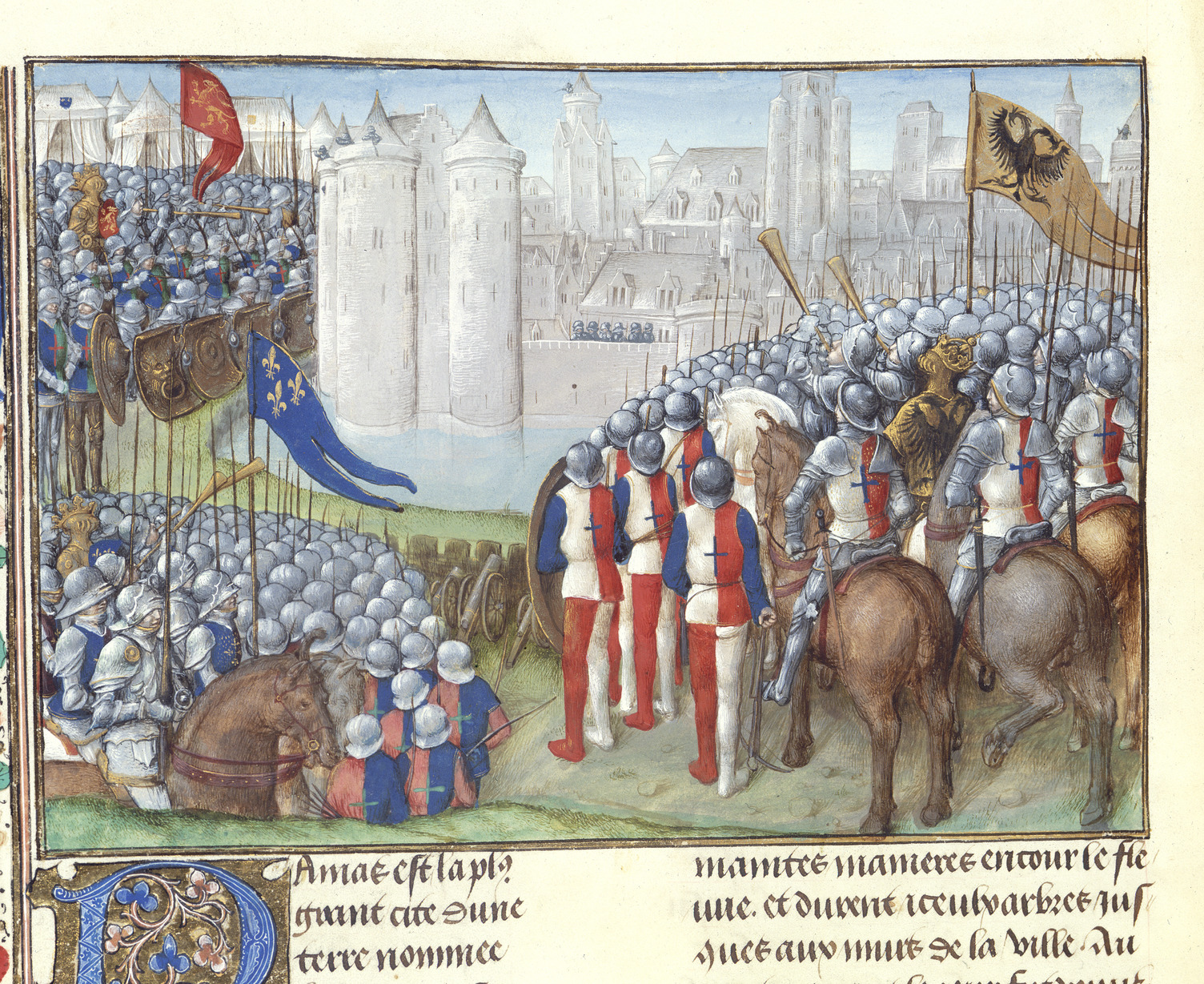
Crusaders besieging Damascus in 1148

The Siege of Damascus (24–28 July) lasted a mere five days and ended in failure. Gilbert of Mons, writing fifty years later, recorded that Frederick "prevailed in arms before all others in front of Damascus". On 8 September, the German army sailed out of Acre. On the route home, Conrad III and Frederick stopped in Thessaloniki where they swore oaths to uphold the treaty that Conrad had agreed with Emperor Manuel I Komnenos the previous winter. This treaty obligated the Germans to attack King Roger II of Sicily in cooperation with the Byzantines. After confirming the treaty, Frederick was sent ahead to Germany. He passed through Bulgaria and Hungary and arrived in Germany in April 1149.

=== Election ===
When Conrad died in February 1152, only Frederick and the prince-bishop of Bamberg were at his deathbed. Both asserted afterwards that Conrad had, in full possession of his mental faculties, handed the royal insignia to Frederick and indicated that he, rather than Conrad's own six-year-old son, the future Frederick IV, Duke of Swabia, succeed him as king. Frederick energetically pursued the crown and at Frankfurt on 4 March 1152 the kingdom's princely electors designated him as the next German king. He was crowned King of the Romans at Aachen several days later, on 9 March 1152.

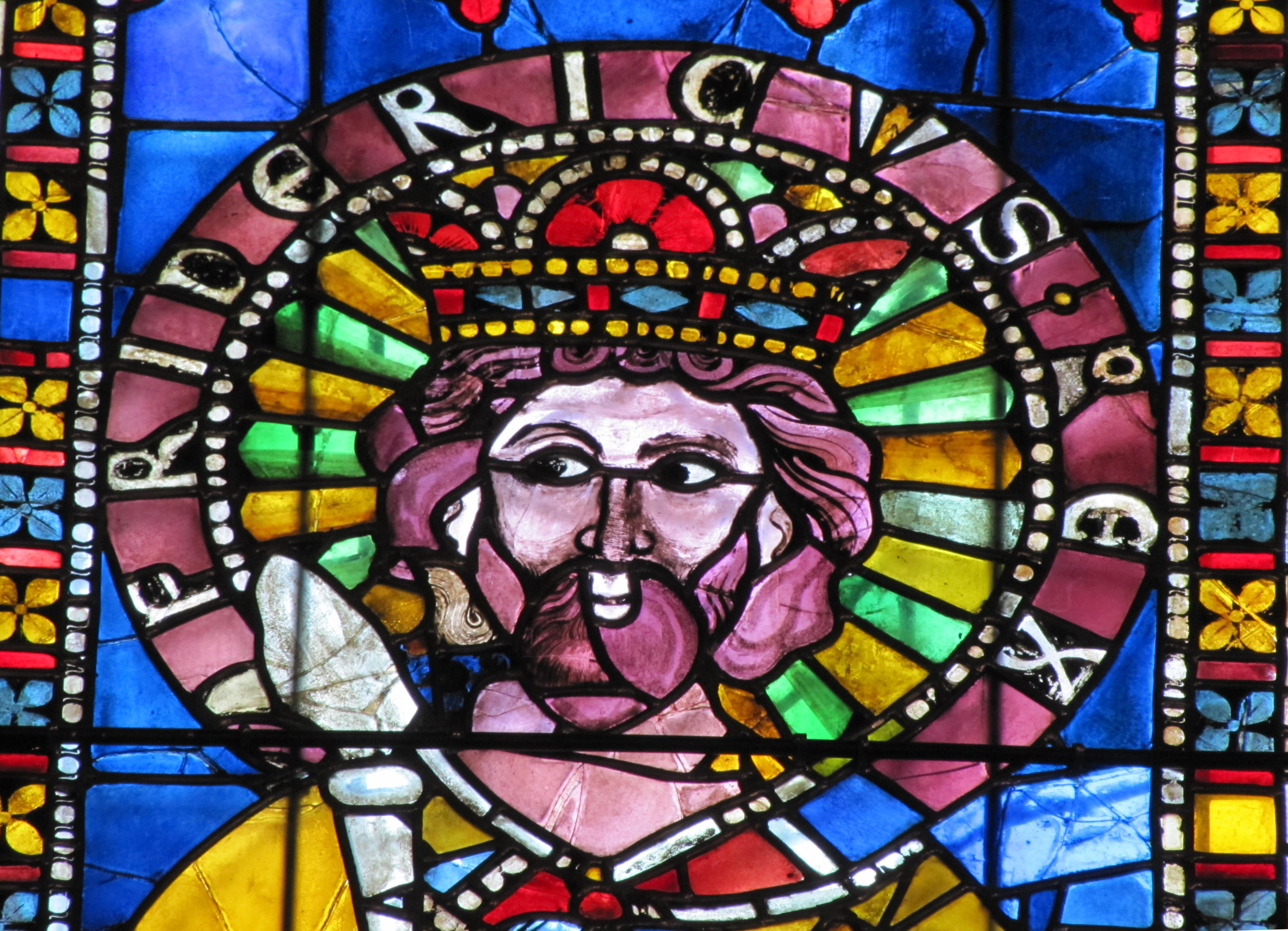
13th-century stained glass image of Frederick I, Strasbourg Cathedral

The reigns of Henry IV and Henry V left the status of the German empire in disarray, its power waning under the weight of the investiture controversy. For a quarter of a century following the death of Henry V in 1125, the German monarchy was largely a nominal title with no real power behind it. The king, chosen by the prince-electors, was given no resources outside those of his own duchy, and he was at the same time prevented from exercising any real authority or leadership. The royal title was furthermore passed from one family to another to preclude the development of any dynastic interest in the German crown. When Frederick was chosen as king in 1152, royal power had been in effective abeyance for over twenty-five years, and to a considerable degree for more than eighty years. The only real claim to wealth lay in the rich cities of northern Italy, which were still within the nominal control of the German king. The Salian line had died out with the death of Henry V in 1125, and the German princes refused to give the crown to his nephew, the duke of Swabia, for fear he would try to regain the imperial power held by Henry V. Instead, they chose Lothair III (1125–1137), who found himself embroiled in a long-running dispute with the Hohenstaufens, and who married into the Welfs. One of the Hohenstaufens gained the throne as Conrad III of Germany (1137–1152). When Frederick Barbarossa succeeded his uncle in 1152, there seemed to be excellent prospects for ending the feud, since he was a Welf on his mother's side. The Welf duke of Saxony, Henry the Lion, would not be appeased, however, remaining an implacable enemy of the Hohenstaufen monarchy. Barbarossa had the duchies of Swabia and Franconia, the force of his own personality, and very little else to construct an empire.

The Germany that Frederick tried to unite was a patchwork of more than 1,600 individual states, each with its own prince. A few of these, such as Bavaria and Saxony, were large. Many were too small to pinpoint on a map. The titles afforded to the German king were "Caesar", "Augustus", and "Emperor of the Romans". By the time Frederick would assume these, they were little more than propaganda slogans with little other meaning. Frederick was a pragmatist who dealt with the princes by finding a mutual self-interest. Frederick did not attempt to end medieval feudalism, but rather tried to restore it, though this was beyond his ability. The great players in the German civil war had been the Pope, Emperor, Ghibellines and the Guelfs, but none of these had emerged as the winner.

=== Rise to power ===
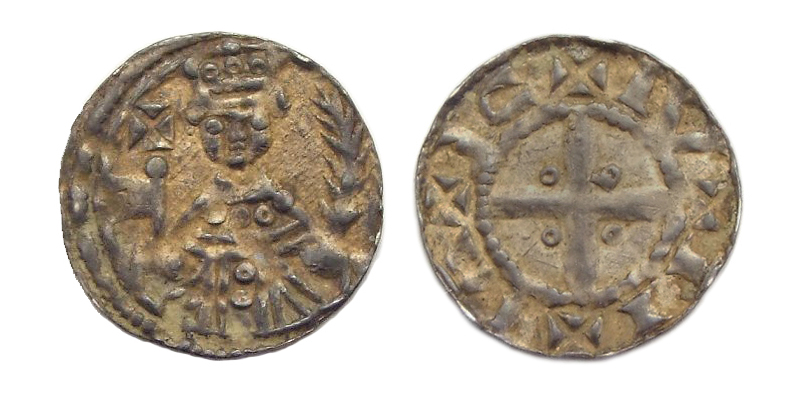
Penny or denier with Emperor Frederick I Barbarossa, struck in Nijmegen

Eager to restore the Empire to the position it had occupied under Charlemagne and Otto I the Great, the new king saw clearly that the restoration of order in Germany was a necessary preliminary to the enforcement of the imperial rights in Italy. Issuing a general order for peace, he made lavish concessions to the nobles. Abroad, Frederick intervened in the Danish civil war between Svend III and Valdemar I of Denmark and began negotiations with the Eastern Roman Emperor, Manuel I Comnenus. It was probably about this time that the king obtained papal assent for the annulment of his childless marriage with Adelheid of Vohburg, on the grounds of consanguinity (his great-great-grandfather was a brother of Adela's great-great-great-grandmother, making them fourth cousins, once removed). He then made a vain attempt to obtain a bride from the court of Constantinople. On his accession, Frederick had communicated the news of his election to Pope Eugene III, but had neglected to ask for papal confirmation. In March 1153, Frederick concluded the Treaty of Constance with the Pope, wherein he promised, in return for his coronation, to defend the papacy, to make no peace with king Roger II of Sicily or other enemies of the Church without the consent of Eugene, and to help Eugene regain control of the city of Rome.

=== First Italian Campaign: 1154–55 ===
Frederick undertook six expeditions into Italy. In the first, beginning in October 1154, his plan was to launch a campaign against the Normans under King William I of Sicily. He marched down and almost immediately encountered resistance to his authority. Obtaining the submission of Milan, he successfully besieged Tortona on 13 February 1155, razing it to the ground on 18 April. He moved on to Pavia, where he according to some historians received the Iron Crown and the title of King of Italy on 24 April in the Basilica of San Michele Maggiore. Other historians instead suggest his coronation took place in Monza on 15 April. Moving through Bologna and Tuscany, he was soon approaching the city of Rome. There, Pope Adrian IV was struggling with the forces of the republican city commune led by Arnold of Brescia, a student of Abelard. As a sign of good faith, Frederick dismissed the ambassadors from the revived Roman Senate, and Imperial forces suppressed the republicans. Arnold was captured and hanged for treason and rebellion. Despite his unorthodox teaching concerning theology, Arnold was not charged with heresy.

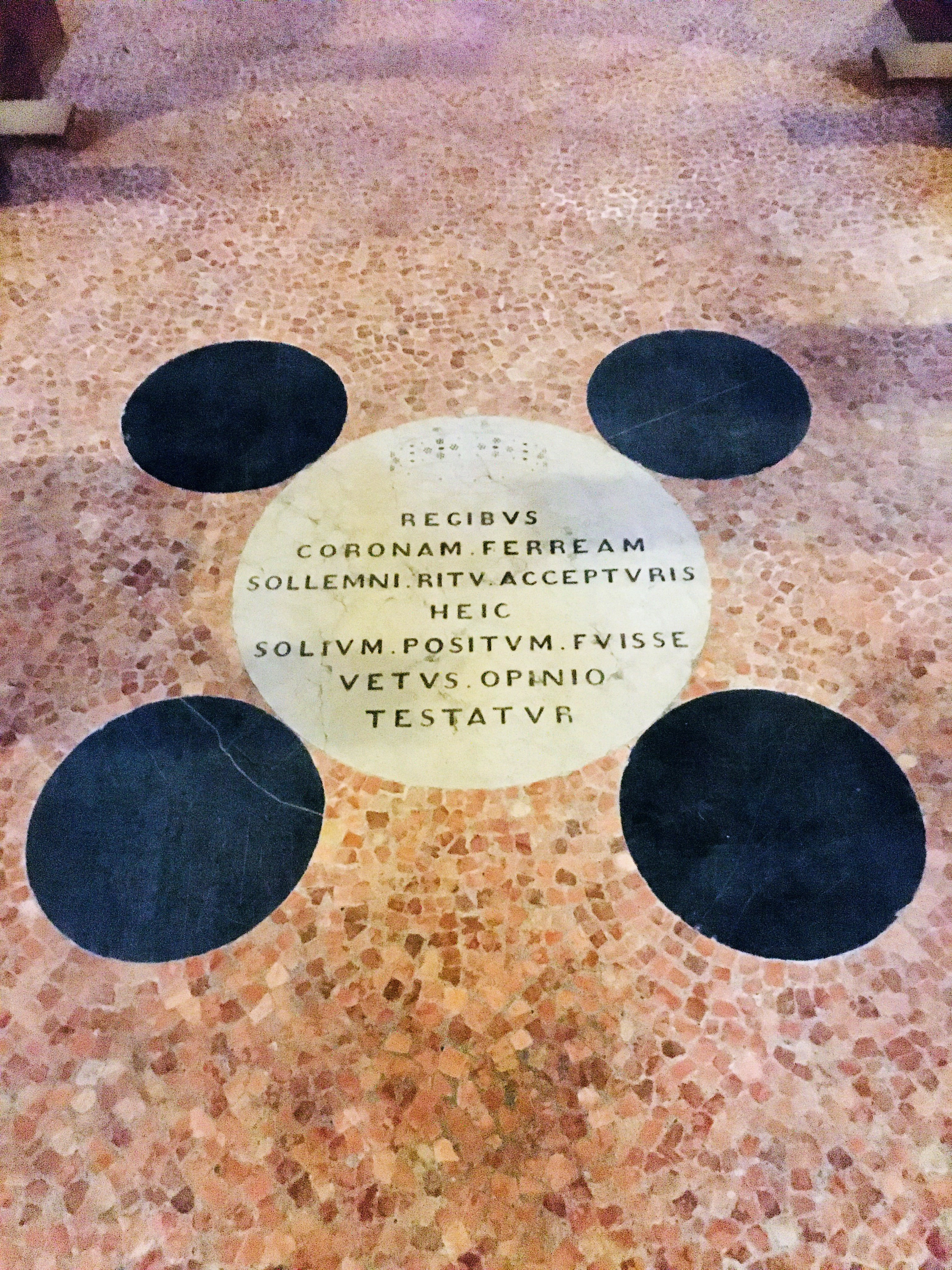
Pavia, Basilica of San Michele Maggiore, the five stones above which the throne was placed during coronation of Frederick I.

As Frederick approached the gates of Rome, the Pope advanced to meet him. At the royal tent the king received him, and after kissing the pope's feet, Frederick expected to receive the traditional kiss of peace. Frederick had declined to hold the Pope's stirrup while leading him to the tent, however, so Adrian refused to give the kiss until this protocol had been complied with. Frederick hesitated, and Adrian IV withdrew; after a day's negotiation, Frederick agreed to perform the required ritual, reportedly muttering, "Pro Petro, non Adriano – For Peter, not for Adrian." Rome was still in an uproar over the fate of Arnold of Brescia, so rather than marching through the streets of Rome, Frederick and Adrian retired to the Vatican.

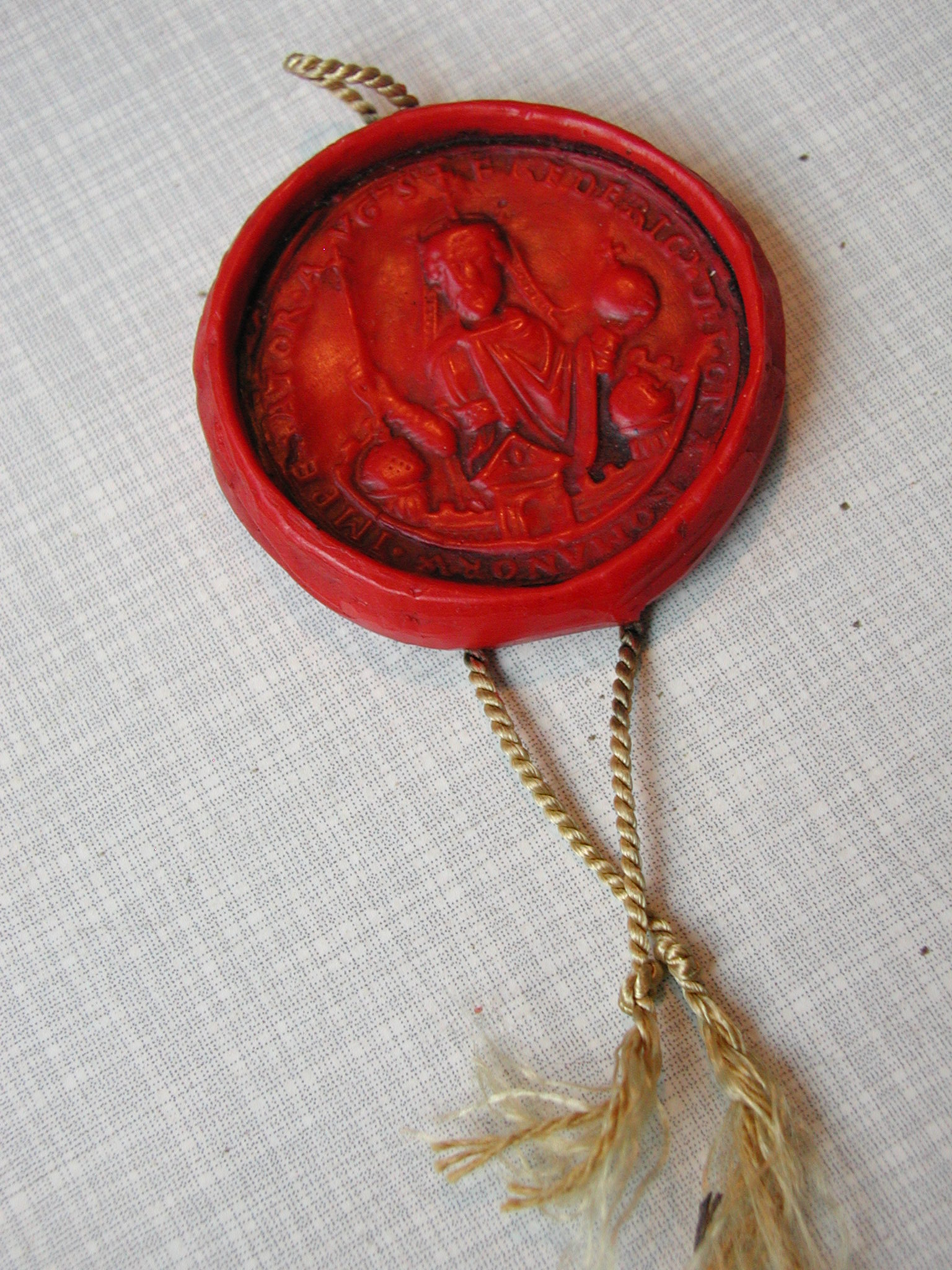
Wax seal of Frederick I, used in the imperial residence of Pfalz Wimpfen

The next day, 18 June 1155, Adrian IV crowned Frederick I Holy Roman Emperor at St Peter's Basilica, amidst the acclamations of the German army. The Romans began to riot, and Frederick spent his coronation day putting down the revolt, resulting in the deaths of over 1,000 Romans and many more thousands injured. The next day, Frederick, Adrian, and the German army travelled to Tivoli. Disease spread amongst his troops during the hot summer, so Frederick was forced to put off his planned campaign against the Normans of Sicily. On their way northwards, they attacked Spoleto and encountered the ambassadors of Manuel I Comnenus, who showered Frederick with costly gifts. At Verona, Frederick declared his fury with the rebellious Milanese before finally returning to Germany.

Disorder was again rampant in Germany, especially in Bavaria, but general peace was restored by Frederick's vigorous, but conciliatory, measures. The duchy of Bavaria was transferred from Henry II Jasomirgott, margrave of Austria, to Frederick's formidable younger cousin Henry the Lion, Duke of Saxony, of the House of Guelph, whose father had previously held both duchies. Henry II Jasomirgott was named Duke of Austria in compensation for his loss of Bavaria. As part of his general policy of concessions of formal power to the German princes and ending the civil wars within the kingdom, Frederick further appeased Henry by issuing him with the Privilegium Minus, granting him unprecedented entitlements as Duke of Austria. This was a large concession on the part of Frederick, who realized that Henry the Lion had to be accommodated, even to the point of sharing some power with him. Frederick could not afford to make an outright enemy of Henry.

On 9 June 1156 at Würzburg, Frederick married Countess Beatrice I of Burgundy, thus adding to his possessions the sizeable County of Burgundy. In an attempt to create comity, Emperor Frederick proclaimed the Peace of the Land, written between 1152 and 1157, which enacted punishments for a variety of crimes, as well as systems for adjudicating many disputes. He also declared himself the sole Augustus of the Roman world, ceasing to recognise Manuel I at Constantinople.

=== Second, Third and Fourth Italian Campaigns: 1158–1174 ===
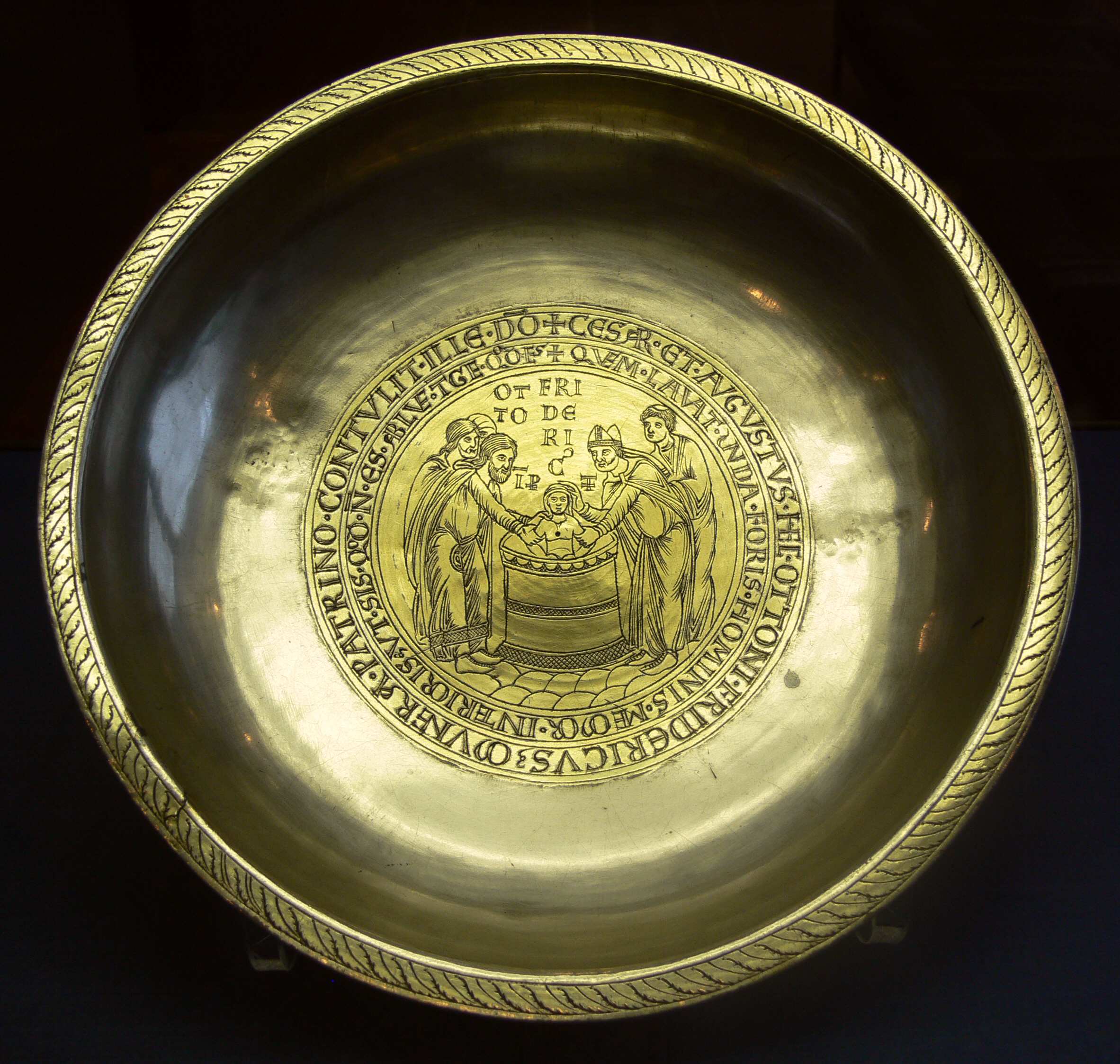
Frederick's so-called baptismal cup, silver, partly gilded, Aachen c. 1160

The retreat of Frederick in 1155 forced Pope Adrian IV to come to terms with King William I of Sicily, granting to William I territories that Frederick viewed as his dominion. This aggrieved Frederick, and he was further displeased when Papal legates chose to interpret a letter from Adrian to Frederick in a manner that seemed to imply that the imperial crown was a gift from the Papacy and that in fact the Empire itself was a fief of the Papacy. Disgusted with the pope, and still wishing to crush the Normans in the south of Italy, in June 1158, Frederick set out upon his second Italian expedition, accompanied by Henry the Lion and his Saxon troops. This expedition resulted in the revolt and capture of Milan, the Diet of Roncaglia that saw the establishment of imperial officers and ecclesiastical reforms in the cities of northern Italy, and the beginning of the long struggle with Pope Alexander III. Milan soon rebelled again and humiliated Empress Beatrice (see Legend below).

The death of Pope Adrian IV in 1159 led to the election of two rival popes, Alexander III and the antipope Victor IV, and both sought Frederick's support. Frederick, busy with the siege of Crema, appeared unsupportive of Alexander III, and after the sacking of Crema demanded that Alexander appear before the emperor at Pavia and to accept the imperial decree. Alexander refused, and Frederick recognised Victor IV as the legitimate pope in 1160. In response, Alexander III excommunicated both Frederick I and Victor IV. Frederick attempted to convoke a joint council with King Louis VII of France in 1162 to decide the issue of who should be pope. Louis neared the meeting site, but when he became aware that Frederick had stacked the votes for Victor, Louis decided not to attend the council. As a result, the issue was not resolved at that time.

The political result of the struggle with Pope Alexander was an alliance formed between the Norman state of Sicily and Pope Alexander III against Frederick. In the meantime, Frederick had to deal with another rebellion at Milan, in which the city surrendered on 6 March 1162; much of it was destroyed three weeks later on the emperor's orders. The fate of Milan led to the submission of Brescia, Placentia, and many other northern Italian cities. In August 1162 he triumphantly entered Turin and was crowned with his consort in the cathedral on August 15. Returning to Germany towards the close of 1162, Frederick prevented the escalation of conflicts between Henry the Lion from Saxony and a number of neighbouring princes who were growing weary of Henry's power, influence, and territorial gains. He also severely punished the citizens of Mainz for their rebellion against Archbishop Arnold. In Frederick's third visit to Italy in 1163, his plans for the conquest of Sicily were ruined by the formation of a powerful league against him, brought together mainly by opposition to imperial taxes.

In 1164, Frederick took what are believed to be the relics of the "Biblical Magi" (the Wise Men or Three Kings) from the Basilica di Sant'Eustorgio in Milan and gave them as a gift (or as loot) to the Archbishop of Cologne, Rainald of Dassel. The relics had great religious significance and could be counted upon to draw pilgrims from all over Christendom. Today they are kept in the Shrine of the Three Kings in the Cologne Cathedral. After the death of the antipope Victor IV, Frederick supported antipope Paschal III, but he was soon driven from Rome, leading to the return of Pope Alexander III in 1165.

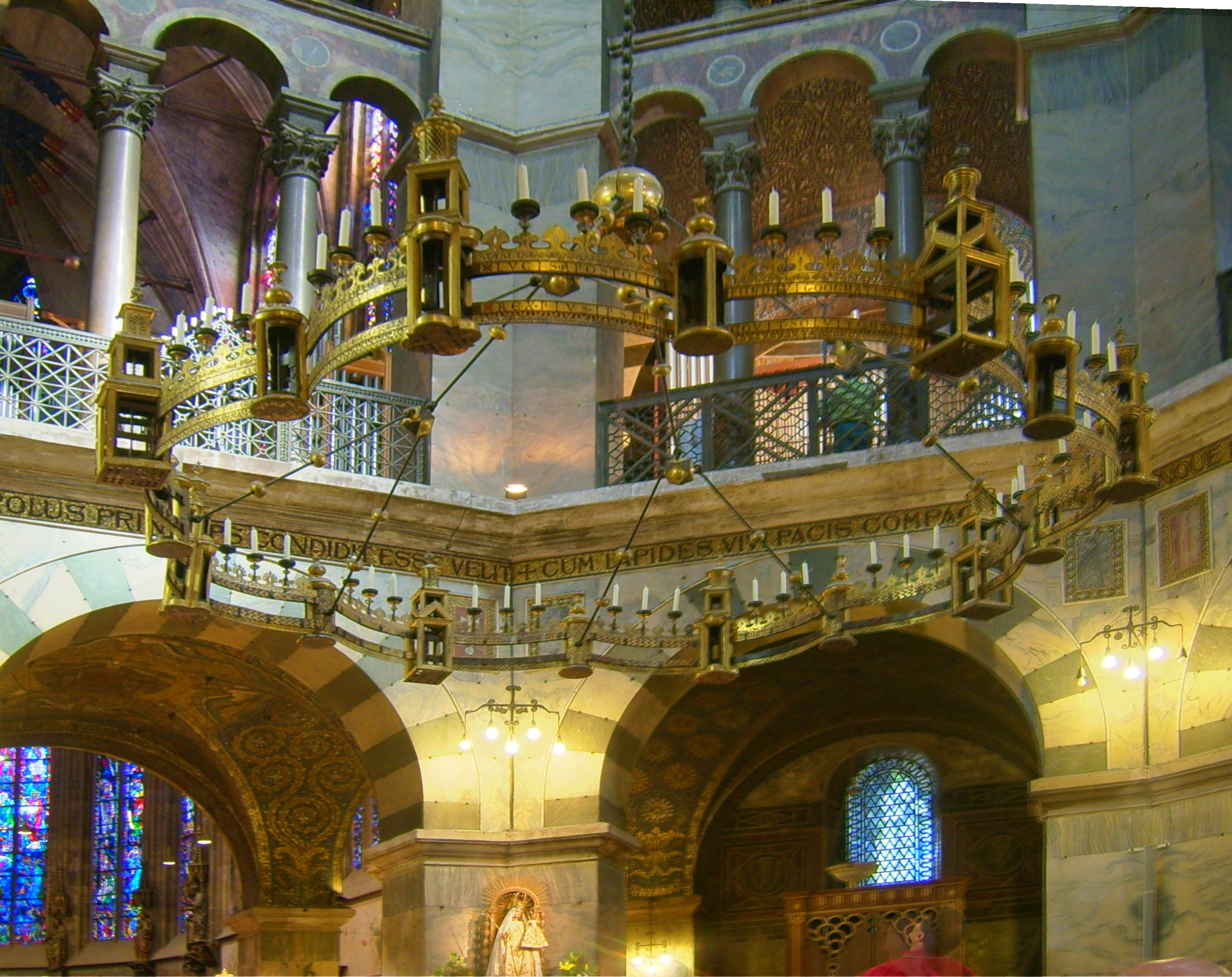
The Barbarossa Chandelier in Aachen Cathedral was donated by Frederick sometime after 1165 as a tribute to Charlemagne.

In the meantime Frederick was focused on restoring peace in the Rhineland, where he organized a magnificent celebration of the canonization of Charlemagne at Aachen, under the authority of the antipope Paschal III. Concerned over rumours that Alexander III was about to enter into an alliance with the Byzantine Emperor Manuel I, in October 1166 Frederick embarked on his fourth Italian campaign, hoping as well to secure the claim of Paschal III and the coronation of his wife Beatrice as Holy Roman Empress. This time, Henry the Lion refused to join Frederick on his Italian trip, tending instead to his own disputes with neighbors and his continuing expansion into Slavic territories in northeastern Germany. In 1167 Frederick began besieging Ancona, which had acknowledged the authority of Manuel I; at the same time, his forces achieved a great victory over the Romans at the Battle of Monte Porzio. Heartened by this victory, Frederick lifted the siege of Ancona and hurried to Rome, where he had his wife crowned empress and also received a second coronation from Paschal III. His campaign was halted by the sudden outbreak of an epidemic (malaria or the plague), which threatened to destroy the Imperial army and drove the emperor as a fugitive to Germany, where he remained for the ensuing six years. During this period, Frederick decided conflicting claims to various bishoprics, asserted imperial authority over Bohemia, Poland, and Hungary, initiated friendly relations with Manuel I, and tried to come to a better understanding with Henry II of England and Louis VII of France. Many Swabian counts, including his cousin the young Duke of Swabia, Frederick IV, died in 1167, so he was able to organize a new mighty territory in the Duchy of Swabia under his reign in this time. Consequently, his younger son Frederick V became the new Duke of Swabia in 1167, while his second son Henry was crowned King of the Romans in 1169, alongside his father who also retained the title.

=== Later years ===
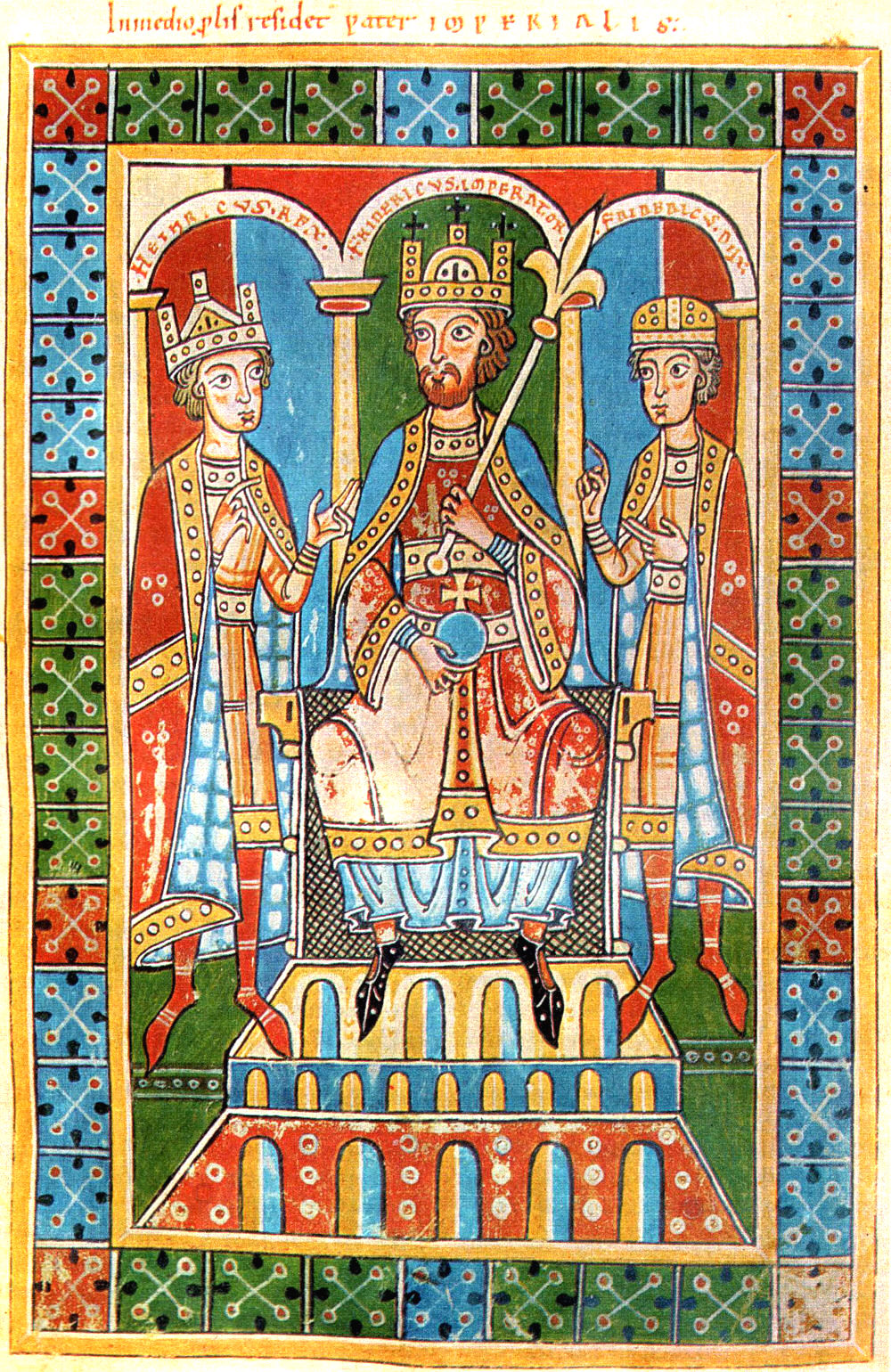
Frederick Barbarossa, middle, flanked by two of his children, King Henry VI (left) and Duke Frederick VI (right). From the Historia Welforum

Increasing anti-German sentiment swept through Lombardy, culminating in the restoration of Milan in 1169. In 1174 Frederick made his fifth expedition to Italy. (It was probably during this time that the famous Tafelgüterverzeichnis, a record of the royal estates, was made.) He was opposed by the pro-papal Lombard League (now joined by Venice, Sicily and Constantinople), which had previously formed to stand against him. The cities of northern Italy had become exceedingly wealthy through trade, representing a marked turning point in the transition from medieval feudalism. While continental feudalism had remained strong socially and economically, it was in deep political decline by the time of Frederick Barbarossa. When the northern Italian cities inflicted a defeat on Frederick at Alessandria in 1175, the European world was shocked. With the refusal of Henry the Lion to bring help to Italy, the campaign was a complete failure. Frederick suffered a heavy defeat at the Battle of Legnano near Milan, on 29 May 1176, where he was wounded and for some time was believed to be dead. This battle marked the turning point in Frederick's claim to empire. He had no choice other than to begin negotiations for peace with Alexander III and the Lombard League. In the Peace of Anagni in 1176, Frederick recognized Alexander III as pope, and in the Peace of Venice in 1177, Frederick and Alexander III were formally reconciled. With decisions of Paschal III nullfied, Beatrice ceased to be referred as empress.

The scene was similar to that which had occurred between Pope Gregory VII and Henry IV, Holy Roman Emperor at Canossa a century earlier. The conflict was the same as that resolved in the Concordat of Worms: Did the Holy Roman Emperor have the power to name the pope and bishops? The Investiture controversy from previous centuries had been brought to a tendentious peace with the Concordat of Worms and affirmed in the First Council of the Lateran. Now it had recurred, in a slightly different form. Frederick had to humble himself before Alexander III at Venice. The emperor acknowledged the pope's sovereignty over the Papal States, and in return Alexander acknowledged the emperor's overlordship of the Imperial Church. Also in the Peace of Venice, a truce was made with the Lombard cities, which took effect in August 1178. The grounds for a permanent peace were not established until 1183, however, in the Peace of Constance, when Frederick conceded their right to freely elect town magistrates. By this move, Frederick recovered his nominal domination over Italy, which became his chief means of applying pressure on the papacy.

In a move to consolidate his reign after the expedition into Italy, Frederick was formally crowned King of Burgundy at Arles on 30 June 1178. Although traditionally the German kings had inherited the royal crown of Arles since the time of Conrad II, Frederick felt the need to be crowned by the Archbishop of Arles, regardless of his laying claim to the title from 1152.

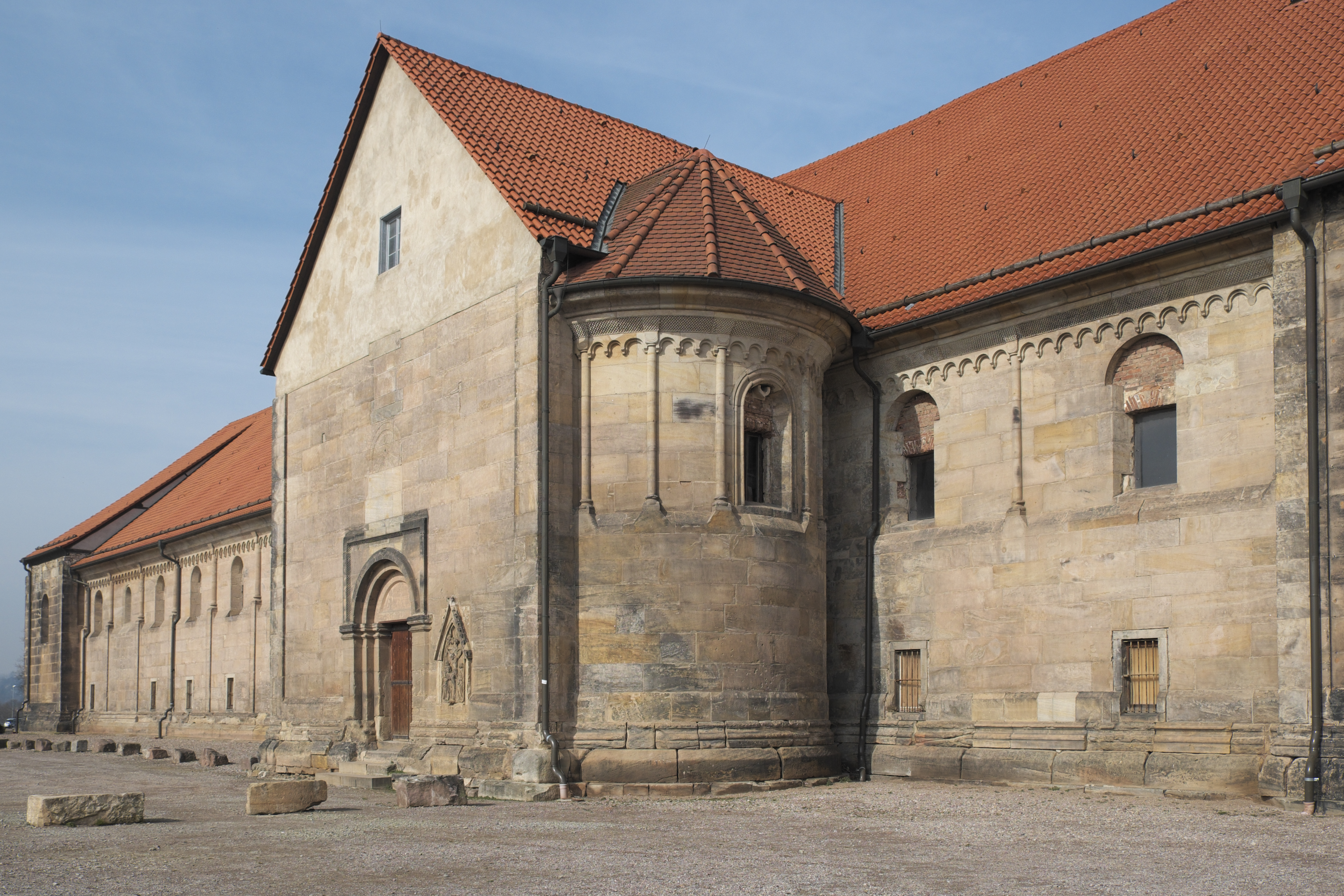
The now secularised St Peter's Church at Petersberg Citadel, Erfurt, where Henry the Lion submitted to Barbarossa in 1181

Frederick did not forgive Henry the Lion for refusing to come to his aid in 1176. By 1180, Henry had successfully established a powerful state comprising Saxony, Bavaria, and substantial territories in the north and east of Germany. Taking advantage of the hostility of other German princes to Henry, Frederick had Henry tried in absentia by a court of bishops and princes in 1180, declared that imperial law overruled traditional German law, and had Henry stripped of his lands and declared an outlaw. He then invaded Saxony with an imperial army to force his cousin to surrender. Henry's allies deserted him, and he finally had to submit to Frederick at an Imperial Diet in Erfurt in November 1181. Henry spent three years in exile at the court of his father-in-law Henry II of England in Normandy before being allowed back into Germany. He finished his days in Germany, as the much-diminished Duke of Brunswick. Frederick's desire for revenge was sated. Henry the Lion lived a relatively quiet life, sponsoring arts and architecture. Frederick's victory over Henry did not gain him as much in the German feudalistic system as it would have in the English feudalistic system. While in England the pledge of fealty went in a direct line from overlords to those under them, the Germans pledged oaths only to the direct overlord, so that in Henry's case, those below him in the feudal chain owed nothing to Frederick. Thus, despite the diminished stature of Henry the Lion, Frederick did not gain his allegiances.

Frederick was faced with the reality of disorder among the German states, where continuous civil wars were waged between pretenders and the ambitious who wanted the crown for themselves. Italian unity under German rule was more myth than truth. Despite proclamations of German hegemony, the pope was the most powerful force in Italy. When Frederick returned to Germany after his defeat in northern Italy, he was a bitter and exhausted man. The German princes, far from being subordinated to royal control, were intensifying their hold on wealth and power in Germany and entrenching their positions. There began to be a generalized social desire to "create greater Germany" by conquering the Slavs to the east.

Although the Italian city states had achieved a measure of independence from Frederick as a result of his failed fifth expedition into Italy, the emperor had not given up on his Italian dominions. In 1184, he held a massive celebration, the Diet of Pentecost, when his two eldest sons were knighted, and thousands of knights were invited from all over Germany. While payments upon the knighting of a son were part of the expectations of an overlord in England and France, only a "gift" was given in Germany for such an occasion. Frederick's monetary gain from this celebration is said to have been modest. Later in 1184, Frederick again moved into Italy, this time joining forces with the local rural nobility to reduce the power of the Tuscan cities. In 1186, he engineered the marriage of his son Henry to Constance of Sicily, heiress to the Kingdom of Sicily, over the objections of Pope Urban III.

Pope Urban III died shortly after, and was succeeded by Pope Gregory VIII, who even as Papal Chancellor had pursued a more conciliatory line with the Emperor than previous popes and was more concerned with troubling reports from the Holy Land than with a power struggle with Barbarossa.

=== Third Crusade ===
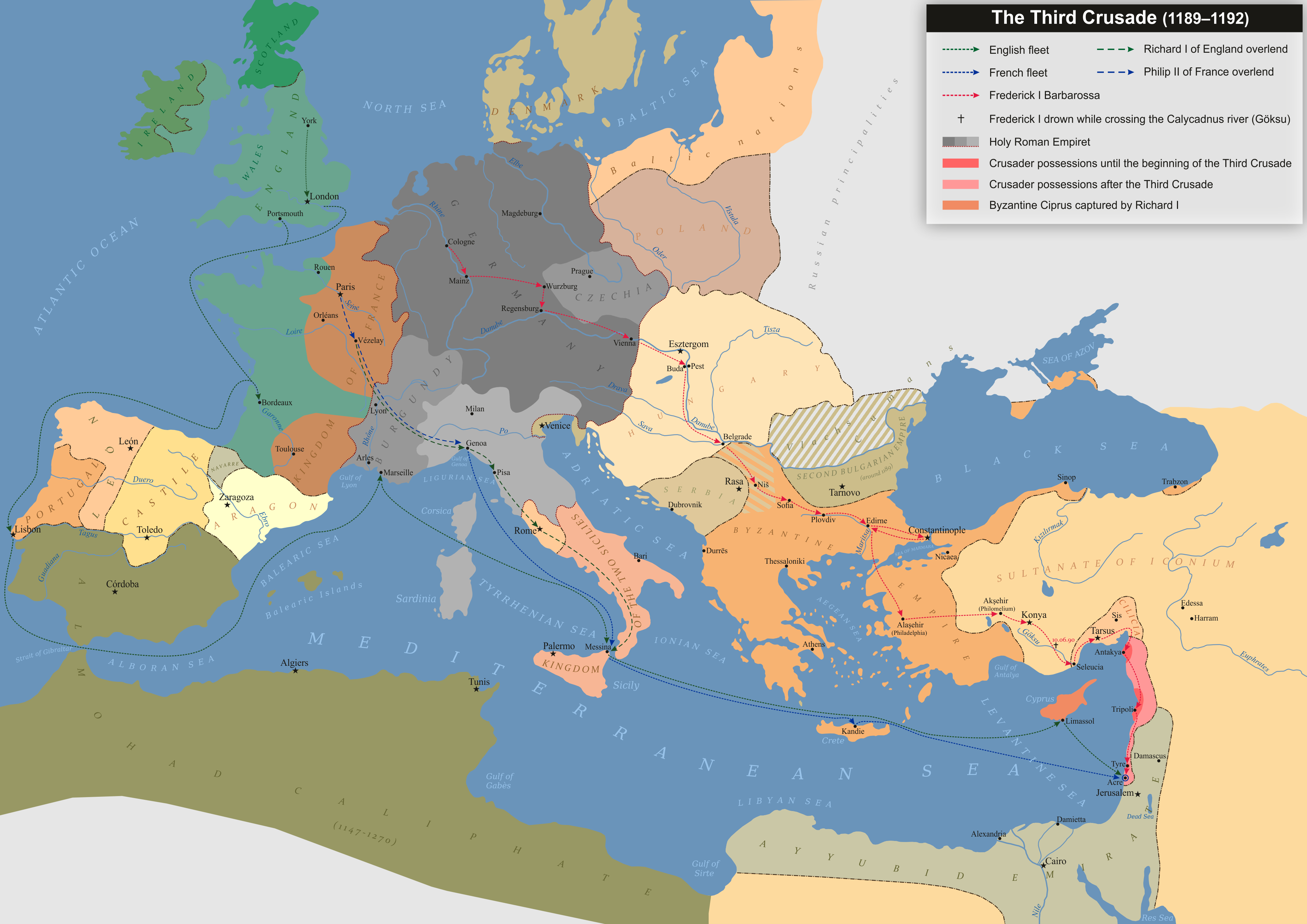
Path of the Third Crusade, Frederick Barbarossa's path in red

Around 23 November 1187, Frederick received letters that had been sent to him from the rulers of the Crusader states in the Near East urging him to come to their aid. Around 1 December, Cardinal Henry of Marcy preached a crusade sermon before Frederick and a public assembly in Strasbourg. Frederick expressed support for the crusade but declined to take the cross on the grounds of his ongoing conflict with Archbishop Philip of Cologne. He did, however, urge King Philip II of France to take the cross through messengers and then in a personal meeting on 25 December on the border between Ivois and Mouzon.

On 27 March 1188, at the Diet of Mainz, the archbishop of Cologne submitted to Frederick. Bishop of Würzburg, Godfrey of Spitzenberg, preached a crusade sermon and Frederick asked the assembly whether he should take the cross. At the universal acclaim of the assembly, he took the crusader's vow. His second son, the duke of Swabia, followed suit. The eldest, Henry VI, was to remain behind in Germany as regent. At Mainz Frederick proclaimed a "general expedition against the pagans". He set the period of preparation as 17 April 1188 to 8 April 1189 and scheduled the army to assemble at Regensburg on 23 April 1189.

At Strasbourg, Frederick had imposed a small tax on the Jews of Germany to fund the crusade. He also put the Jews under his protection and forbade anyone to preach against the Jews. When mobs threatened the Jews of Mainz on the eve of the assembly in March, Frederick sent the imperial marshal Henry of Kalden to disperse them. Rabbi Moses then met with the emperor, which resulted in an imperial edict threatening maiming or death for anyone who maimed or killed a Jew. On 29 March, Frederick and the rabbi rode through the streets together. Frederick successfully prevented a repeat of the massacres that had accompanied the First Crusade and Second Crusade in Germany.

Because Frederick had signed a treaty of friendship with Saladin in 1175, he felt it necessary to give Saladin notice of the termination of their alliance. (Note: There is a published correspondence, almost certainly forged, between Frederick and Saladin concerning the end of their friendship.) On 26 May 1188, he sent Count Henry II of Dietz to present an ultimatum to Saladin. A few days after Christmas 1188, Frederick received Hungarian, Byzantine, Serbian and Seljuk envoys in Nuremberg. The Hungarians and Seljuks promised provisions and safe-conduct to the crusaders. The envoys of Stefan Nemanja, grand prince of Serbia, announced that their prince would receive Frederick in Niš. Only with difficulty was an agreement reached with the Byzantine envoy, John Kamateros. Frederick sent a large embassy ahead to make preparations in Byzantium.

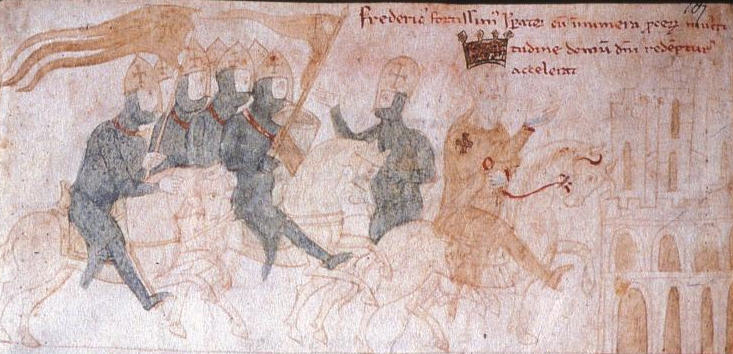
Frederick Barbarossa depicted during the Third Crusade

On 15 April 1189 in Hagenau, Frederick formally and symbolically accepted the staff and scrip of a pilgrim and set out. His crusade was "the most meticulously planned and organized" up to that time. According to one source written in the 1220s, Frederick organized a grand army of 100,000 men (including 20,000 knights) and set out on the overland route to the Holy Land; This number is believed to be inaccurate by modern scholars using incomplete contemporary sources that place the size of his army at 12,000–15,000 men, including 3,000–4,000 knights.

On 11 May 1189, after the majority of his army had already departed toward Hungary on land, Frederick sailed from Regensburg down the River Danube. When he came to the village of Mauthausen, Frederick ordered the village to be burned for levying a toll on the crusader army. The Crusaders then passed through Hungary, Serbia, and Bulgaria before entering Byzantine territory. While in Hungary, Barbarossa personally asked the Hungarian Prince Géza, brother of King Béla III of Hungary, to join the Crusade. The king agreed, and a Hungarian army of 2,000 men led by Géza escorted the German emperor's forces. Later on, Frederick camped in Philippopolis, then in Adrianople in the autumn of 1189 to avoid the winter climate in Anatolia, in the meantime, he received imprisoned German emissaries who were held in Constantinople, and exchanged hostages with Isaac II, as a guarantee that the crusaders would not sack local settlements until they depart the Byzantine territory. In March 1190, Frederick left Adrianople for Gallipoli at the Dardanelles, to embark to Asia Minor.

The armies coming from western Europe pushed on through Anatolia, where they were victorious at the Battle of Philomelium and defeated the Turks in the Battle of Iconium, (Note: Seljuk Sultan Kilij Arslan II promised the armies of the Third Crusade, led by Frederick Barbarossa to freely pass through his territories; however, his sons who were local chieftains disagreed and fought against the Crusaders at the Battle of Philomelion and Battle of Iconium.) eventually reaching as far as Cilician Armenia. The approach of Barbarossa's victorious German army greatly concerned Saladin, who was forced to weaken his force at the Siege of Acre and send troops to the north to block the arrival of the Germans.

=== Death and burials ===
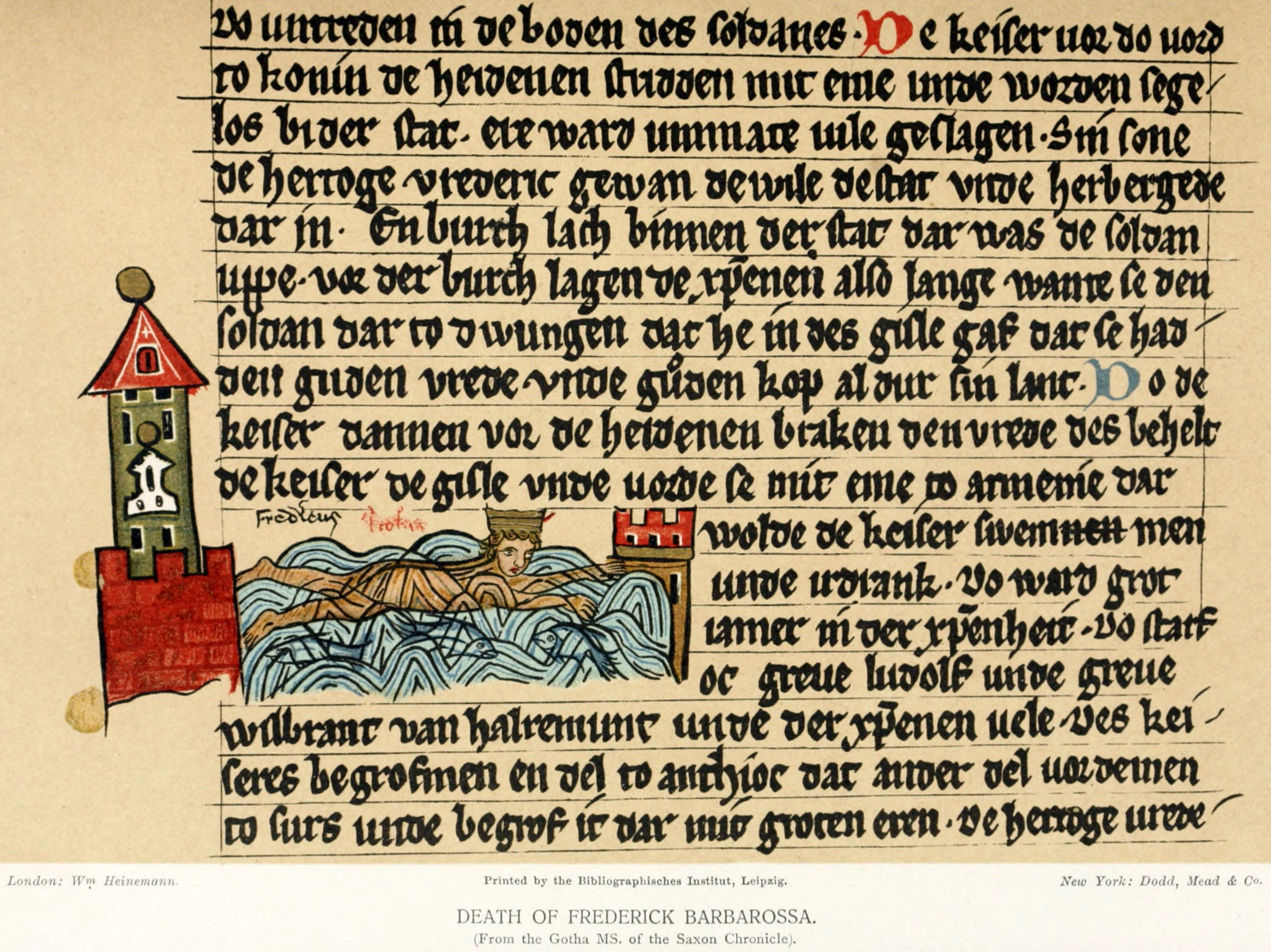
Barbarossa drowns in the Saleph, from the Gotha Manuscript of the Saxon World Chronicle

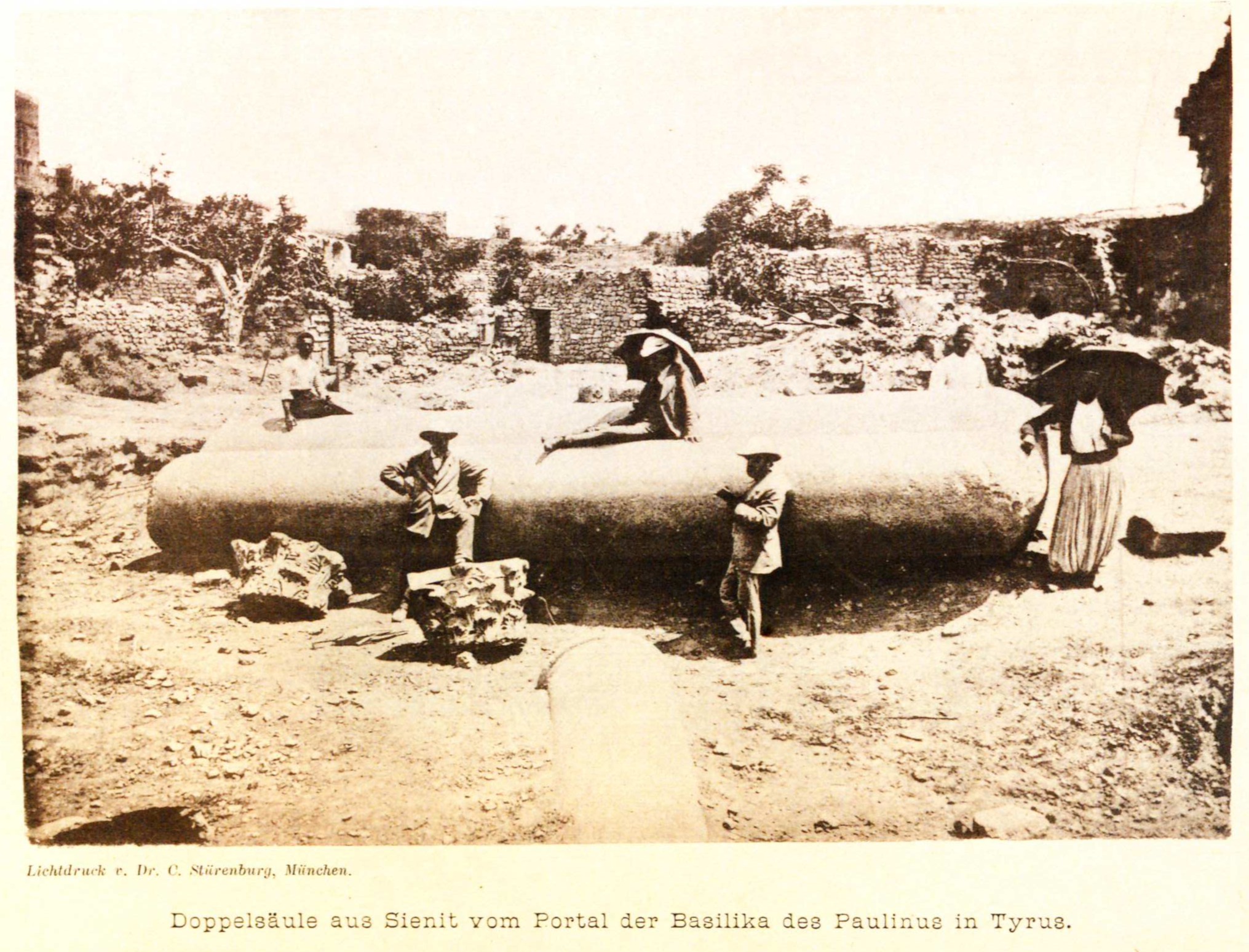
A German expedition led by Johann Nepomuk Sepp to excavate the bones from the ruins of the Cathedral of Tyre, 1879

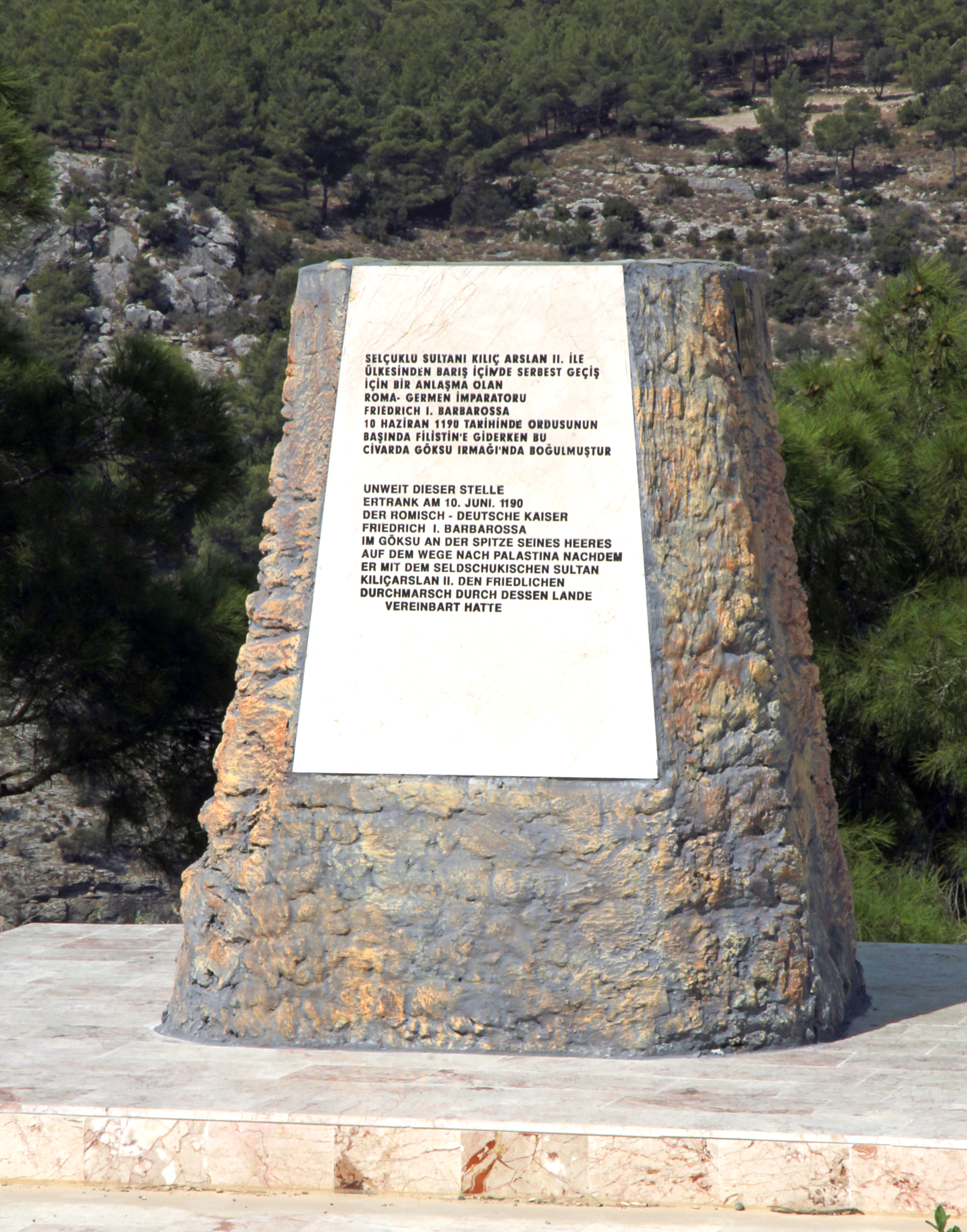
The Frederick Barbarossa Memorial, near Silifke in Mersin Province, southern Turkey. The text explains in Turkish and German how Frederick drowned nearby.

Barbarossa opted on the local Armenians' advice to follow a shortcut along the Saleph River on Taşeli in present-day Turkey. Meanwhile, the army started to traverse the mountain path. On 10 June 1190, he drowned in the river near the castle in Seleucia. There are several conflicting accounts of the event:

- According to "Ansbert", (Note: "Ansbert" is an Austrian cleric, who wrote The History of the Expedition of the Emperor Frederick, based on Tageno's diary, the dean of Passau Cathedral who accompanied the crusaders.) against everyone's advice, the emperor chose to swim across the river and was swept away by the current.
- Another account recorded that Frederick was thrown from his horse while crossing the river, weighed down by his armour, and drowned.
- According to the chronicler Ibn al-Athir, "the king went down to the river to wash himself and was drowned at a place where the water was not even up to his waist. Thus God saved us from the evil of such a man".
- The writer of the Letter on the Death of the Emperor Frederick, a churchman who accompanied the crusader forces, reported that "after the many and terrible exertions that he [Frederick I] had undergone in the previous month and more, he decided to bathe in that same river, for he wanted to cool down with a swim. But by the secret judgment of God there was an unexpected and lamentable death and he drowned." Frederick, who liked to swim, as he went to bathe with Otto of Wittelsbach in the Adriatic, might have been exhausted from weeks of marching, hence he was fatally affected by the very hot summer in Anatolia. If the writer was Godfrey of Spitzenberg, Bishop of Würzburg, who was a close confidant of Frederick, the report would be the most plausible account of what happened, since he might have witnessed the emperor's death.

Jacques de Vitry, a historian of the Crusades, outlined Frederick's endeavors and Saladin's dilemma, in which he reported:

While these were the varied fortunes of the first in the field, Frederick, the Roman emperor, set out on his journey by land with great power and a countless host of warriors. Passing over the borders of Germany, he crossed Hungary, Macedonia, and Greece and marched through the land of the Saracens with a mighty hand and a stretched-out arm. He took Iconium, Philomena, and many other cities, and reached Armenia, where, during great heat, he went into the river, which the natives call the Iron River, to bathe, and therein for our sins was miserably drowned, and so died to the loss of all Christendom. Saladin so greatly feared his approach that he ordered the walls of Laodicia, Gibelet, Tortosa, Biblium and Beyrout, to be pulled down, sparing only the fortresses, that is the citadels and towers.

Frederick's death caused several thousand German soldiers to leave the force and return home through the Cilician and Syrian ports. The German-Hungarian army was struck with an onset of disease near Antioch, weakening it further. Only 5,000 soldiers, a third of the original force, arrived in Acre. Barbarossa's son, Frederick VI of Swabia, carried on with the remnants of the German army, along with the Hungarian army under the command of Prince Géza, with the aim of burying the emperor in Jerusalem, but efforts to preserve his body in vinegar failed. Hence, his flesh was interred in the Cathedral of Saint Peter in Antioch, his bones in the Cathedral of the Holy Cross, Tyre, and his heart and inner organs in Saint Paul's Church, Tarsus.

The unexpected demise of Frederick left the Crusader army under the command of Leopold V during the siege at Acre. They then came under the command of Frederick's rivals Philip II and Richard, who had traveled to Palestine separately by sea, and this ultimately led to its dissolution. Richard continued to the East where he fought Saladin, winning territories along the shores of Palestine, but ultimately failed to win the war by conquering Jerusalem itself before he was forced to return to his own territories in north-western Europe, known to modern historians as the Angevin Empire. He returned home after he signed the Treaty of Ramla agreeing that Jerusalem would remain under Muslim control while allowing unarmed Christian pilgrims and traders to visit the city. The treaty also reduced the Latin Kingdom to a geopolitical coastal strip extending from Tyre to Jaffa.

== Frederick and the Justinian code ==
The increase in wealth of the trading cities of northern Italy led to a revival in the study of the Justinian Code, a Latin legal system that had become extinct centuries earlier. Legal scholars renewed its application. It is speculated that Pope Gregory VII personally encouraged the Justinian rule of law and had a copy of it. The historian Norman Cantor described Corpus Juris Civilis (Justinian Body of Civil Law) as "the greatest legal code ever devised". It envisaged the law of the state as a reflection of natural moral law, the principle of rationality in the universe. By the time Frederick assumed the throne, this legal system was well established on both sides of the Alps. He was the first to use the availability of the new professional class of lawyers. The Civil Law allowed Frederick to use these lawyers to administer his kingdom in a logical and consistent manner. It also provided a framework to legitimize his claim to the right to rule both Germany and northern Italy. In the old days of Henry IV and Henry V, the claim of divine right of kings had been severely undermined by the Investiture controversy. The Church had won that argument in the common man's mind. There was no divine right for the German king to also control the church by naming both bishops and popes. The institution of the Justinian code was used, perhaps unscrupulously, by Frederick to lay claim to divine powers.

In Germany, Frederick was a political realist, taking what he could and leaving the rest. In Italy, he tended to be a romantic reactionary, reveling in the antiquarian spirit of the age, exemplified by a revival of classical studies and Roman law. It was through the use of the restored Justinian code that Frederick came to view himself as a new Roman emperor. Roman law gave a rational purpose for the existence of Frederick and his imperial ambitions. It was a counterweight to the claims of the Church to have authority because of divine revelation. The Church was opposed to Frederick for ideological reasons, not the least of which was the humanist nature found in the revival of the old Roman legal system. When Pepin the Short sought to become king of the Franks in the 8th century, the church needed military protection, so Pepin found it convenient to make an ally of the pope. Frederick, however, desired to put the pope aside and claim the crown of old Rome simply because he was in the likeness of the great emperors of old, who tended to have a domineering role over the church, Caesaropapism. Pope Adrian IV was naturally opposed to this view and undertook a vigorous propaganda campaign designed to diminish Frederick and his ambition. To a large extent, this was successful.

== Economic policy ==
Frederick did little to encourage economic development in Germany prior to the autumn of 1165. In that year he visited the lower Rhineland, the most economically advanced region in Germany. He had already travelled to northern Italy, the most economically advanced region in the Empire, three times. From 1165 on, Frederick pursued economic policies to encourage growth and trade. There is no question that his reign was a period of major economic growth in Germany, but it is impossible now to determine how much of that growth was owed to Frederick's policies.

The number of mints in Germany increased ninefold in the reign of Frederick and his son Henry, from about two dozen mints at the start of his reign to 215 mints in 1197 and from a mere two (Note: Those of Goslar and Nuremberg were the only royal mints operating in the reign of Conrad III.) royal mints to 28. Frederick himself established at least twelve royal mints, including those of Aachen, Donauwörth, Ulm, Hagenau, Duisburg, Kaiserswerth, Frankfurt, Gelnhausen and Dortmund. He also granted privileges exempting the merchants of Aachen, Gelnhausen, Hagenau, Monza, Rome, Pisa and Venice (Note: All of these were cities of the Empire except for Venice.) from all tolls within the Empire.

== Cultural depictions ==
=== Charismatic leader ===
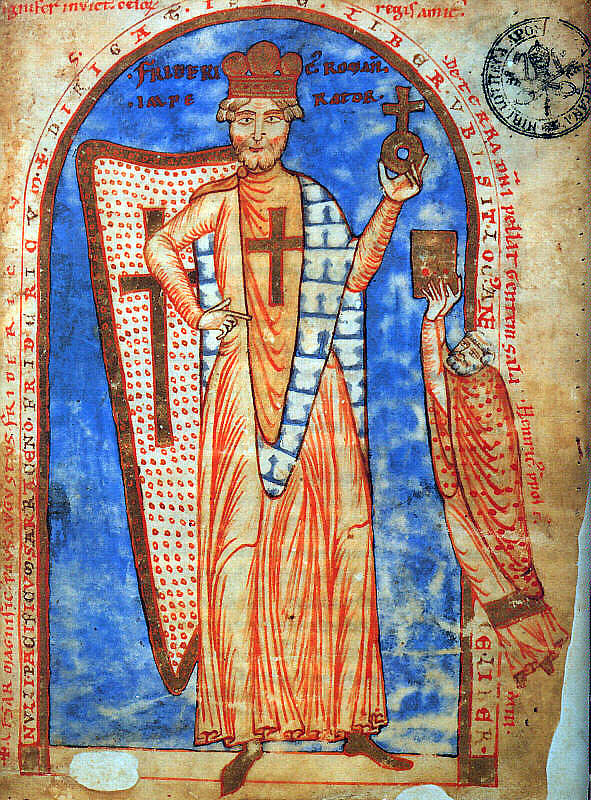
Frederick Barbarossa as a crusader, miniature from a copy of the Historia Hierosolymitana, 1188

Otto of Freising, Frederick's uncle, wrote an account of his reign entitled Gesta Friderici I imperatoris (Deeds of the Emperor Frederick), which is considered to be an accurate history of the king. Otto's other major work, the Chronica sive Historia de duabus civitatibus (Chronicle or History of the Two Cities) had been an exposition of the Civitas Dei (The City of God) of Augustine of Hippo, full of Augustinian negativity concerning the nature of the world and history. His work on Frederick is of opposite tone, being an optimistic portrayal of the glorious potentials of imperial authority. Otto died after finishing the first two books, leaving the last two to Rahewin, his provost. Rahewin's text is in places heavily dependent on classical precedent, although it "was 'typical of medieval writers' to embellish their texts with choice quotations from earlier authors". For example, Rahewin's physical description of Frederick reproduces word-for-word (except for details of hair and beard) a description of another monarch, Theodoric II written nearly eight hundred years earlier by Sidonius Apollinaris:

His character is such that not even those envious of his power can belittle its praise. His person is well-proportioned. He is shorter than very tall men, but taller and more noble than men of medium height. His hair is golden, curling a little above his forehead ... His eyes are sharp and piercing, his beard reddish [barba subrufa], his lips delicate ... His whole face is bright and cheerful. His teeth are even and snow-white in color ... Modesty rather than anger causes him to blush frequently. His shoulders are rather broad, and he is strongly built

In the opinion of Norman Cantor, Frederick's charisma led to a fantastic juggling act that, over a quarter of a century, restored the imperial authority in the German states. His formidable enemies defeated him on almost every side, yet in the end he emerged triumphant. When Frederick came to the throne, the prospects for the revival of German imperial power were extremely thin. The great German princes had increased their power and land holdings. The king had been left with only the traditional family domains and a vestige of power over the bishops and abbeys. The backwash of the Investiture controversy had left the German states in continuous turmoil. Rival states were in perpetual war. These conditions allowed Frederick to be both warrior and occasional peace-maker, both to his advantage.

=== Legend ===
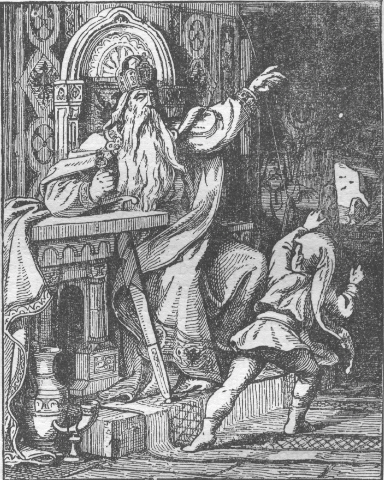
Frederick sends out the boy to see whether the ravens still fly.

Frederick is the subject of many legends, including that of a Kyffhäuser legend. Legend says he is not dead, but asleep with his knights in a cave in the Kyffhäuser mountains in Thuringia or Mount Untersberg at the border between Bavaria, Germany, and Salzburg, Austria, and that when the ravens cease to fly around the mountain he will awake and restore Germany to its ancient greatness. According to the story, his red beard has grown through the table at which he sits. His eyes are half closed in sleep, but now and then he raises his hand and sends a boy out to see if the ravens have stopped flying. A similar story, set in Sicily, was earlier attested about his grandson, Frederick II. To garner political support the German Empire built atop the Kyffhäuser the Kyffhäuser Monument, which declared Kaiser Wilhelm I the reincarnation of Frederick; the 1896 dedication occurred on 18 June, the day of Frederick's coronation.

In medieval Europe, the Golden Legend became refined by Jacopo da Voragine. This was a popularized interpretation of the Biblical end of the world. It consisted of three things: (1) terrible natural disasters; (2) the arrival of the Antichrist; (3) the establishment of a good king to combat the anti-Christ. These millennial fables were common and freely traded by the populations on Continental Europe. End-time accounts had been around for thousands of years, but entered the Christian tradition with the writings of the Apostle Peter. German propaganda played into the exaggerated fables believed by the common people by characterizing Frederick Barbarossa and Frederick II as personification of the "good king".

Another legend states that when Barbarossa was in the process of seizing Milan in 1158, his wife, the Empress Beatrice, was taken captive by the enraged Milanese and forced to ride through the city on a donkey in a humiliating manner. Some sources of this legend indicate that Barbarossa implemented his revenge for this insult by forcing the magistrates of the city to remove a fig from the anus of a donkey using only their teeth. Another source states that Barbarossa took his wrath upon every able-bodied man in the city, and that it was not a fig they were forced to hold in their mouth, but excrement from the donkey. To add to this debasement, they were made to announce, "Ecco la fica" (meaning "behold the fig"), with the feces still in their mouths. It used to be said that the insulting gesture (called fico), of holding one's fist with the thumb in between the middle and forefinger came by its origin from this event.

Frederick's legend was further reinforced in the early twentieth century, when Adolf Hitler named Nazi Germany's invasion of the Soviet Union after him.

=== Historiography ===
Scholarly evaluations of Frederick began in the nineteenth century, but have been hampered by the unfortunate deaths of key researchers who did not have the chance to complete their works (such as Henry Simonsfeld who died in 1913, Wilhelm von Giesebrecht who died in 1889 and Johannes Laudage who died in an accident in 2008). Nevertheless, the two volumes about Frederick (that focus on his relationship with the Welfs and the Papacy) in Wilhelm von Giesebrecht's Geschichte der Deutschen Kaiserzeit (1855–88), completed by his student Bernhard von Simson in 1895, later became the scholarly standard work on the emperor's life.

In 1975, Frederick's charters were published. This and the postwar abandonment of the Kyffhäuser myth have led to the publications of several new biographies. The notable recent authorities among German-speaking historians include Ferdinand Opll, Johannes Laudage, and Knut Görich. Opll's Friedrich Barbarossa (1990) presents the emperor as a pragmatic leader with a capacity of adaptation and recovery after defeat. Laudage investigates the important role of the concept of honour in Frederick's decisions while explaining the far-reaching visions of the emperor and his advisers, while Görich (who also emphasizes the honour, or honor imperii factor) questions whether traditional researchers have overemphasized the intentional side of Frederick's politics and instead highlights his flexibility and consensus-building capability as a leader.

In Italy, the scholarly attention towards Frederick's person and his reign is also considerable, with notable contributions including Franco Cardini's sympathetic 1985 biography or the 1982 work Federico Barbarossa nel dibattito storiografico in Italia e in Germania, edited by Manselli and Riedmann, considered by Schumann to be a definite synthesis of non-nationally oriented historiography approaches (combining German and Italian research results) of the last forty years.

=== Artistic depictions ===
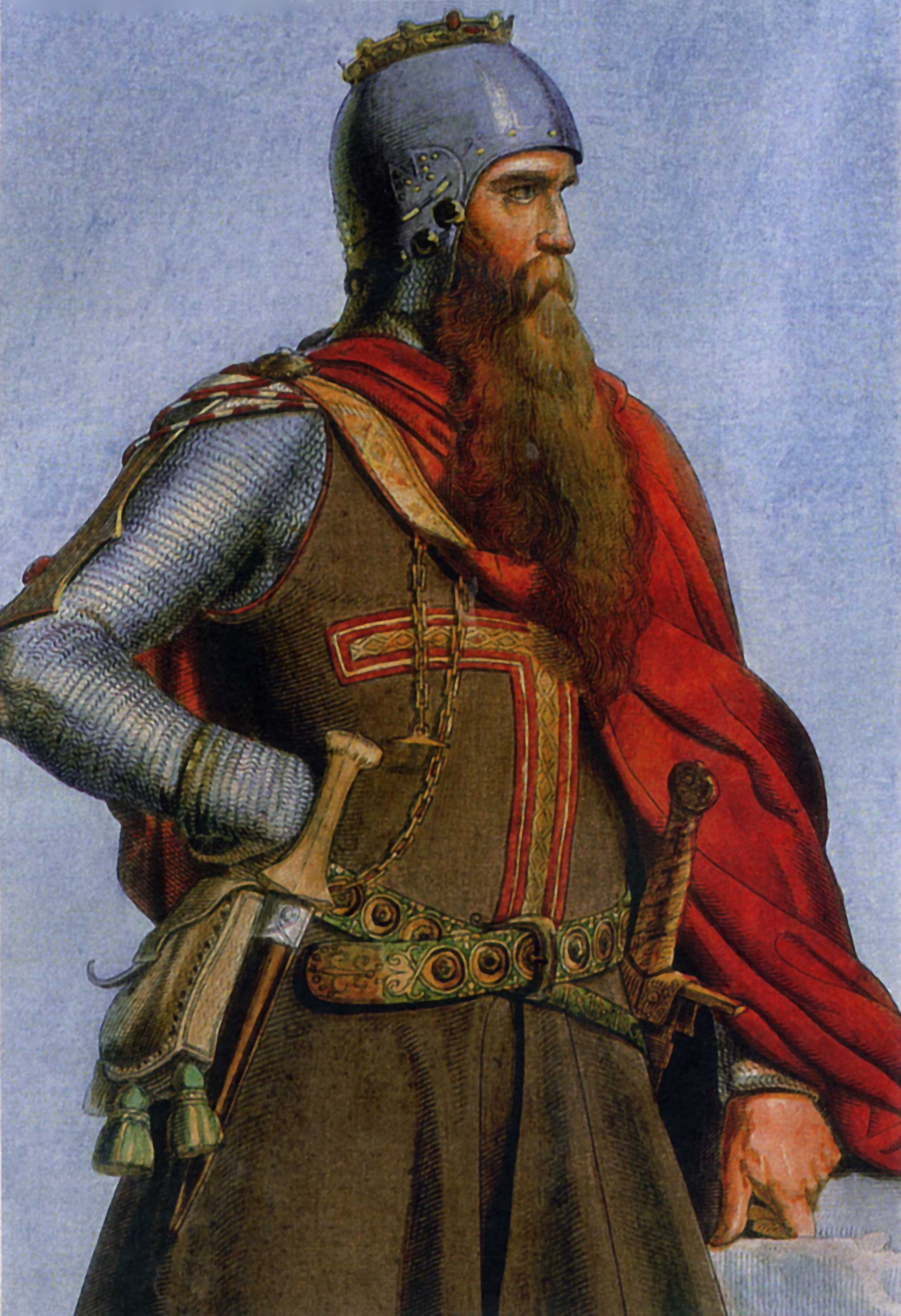
Painting of Friedrich I. Barbarossa (Christian Siedentopf, 1847)

- In Victor Hugo's romantic play Les Burgraves (1843), Frederick (as character Frédéric de Hohenstaufen) returns many years after he was presumed dead, as expected by some medieval legends.
- Cyrus Townsend Brady's Hohenzollern; a Story of the Time of Frederick Barbarossa (1901) begins with a dedication to "the descendants of the great Germanic race who in Europe, in America, and in the Far East rule the world".
- Land of Unreason (1941), by L. Sprague de Camp and Fletcher Pratt, mentions the castle of the Kyffhäuser.
- Umberto Eco's novel Baudolino (2000) is set partly at Frederick's court, and also deals with the mystery of Frederick's death. The imaginary hero, Baudolino, is the Emperor's adopted son and confidant.
- In the 2009 movie Barbarossa (also titled Sword of War and Barbarossa: Siege Lord), Barbarossa is one of the main characters, played by Rutger Hauer.
- The German broadcaster ZDF documentary Die Deutschen (The Germans), featured Frederick I in season 1, episode 3 Barbarossa und der Löwe (Barbarossa and the Lion, 2008).
- The German broadcaster Deutsche Welle (DW) 2018 documentary (The Germans), featured Frederick I in its 3rd of 6 episodes.
- Recently, to commemorate the emperor, the Supply Battalion 131 (called "Battalion Barbarossa") of the Kyffhäuser barracks (Kyffhäuser-Kaserne, Bundeswehr) built a huge ground artwork in Bad Frankenhausen, which uses among other things 300 roles of fabric (each 100 meters long). The mission was named Rotbart ("Redbeard").
- In the video game series, Sid Meier's Civilization, Barbarossa makes an appearance as a playable leader in Civilization VI.
- The video game Age of Empires II and its remasters feature Barbarossa as a leader in playable campaign missions.

== Children ==
Frederick's first marriage, to Adelheid of Vohburg, did not produce any children and was annulled.

From his second marriage to Beatrice of Burgundy, he had the following children:

1. Beatrice (end 1162/early 1163 – at least early 1174/1179). King William II of Sicily first asked for her hand, but the marriage negotiations never came through.
2. Frederick V, Duke of Swabia (Pavia, 16 July 1164 – 28 November 1170).
3. Henry VI, Holy Roman Emperor (Nijmegen, November 1165 – Messina, 28 September 1197).
4. Conrad (Modigliana, February 1167 – Acre, 20 January 1191), later renamed Frederick VI, Duke of Swabia after the death of his older brother.
5. ?Judith (October/November 1168 – end 1184). She was betrothed to Richard, Count of Poitou (later King of England) but died before they could be married.
6. Otto I, Count of Burgundy (June/July 1170 – killed, Besançon, 13 January 1200).
7. Conrad II, Duke of Swabia and Rothenburg (February/March 1172 – killed, Durlach, 15 August 1196).
8. Rainald (October/November 1173 – before April 1174/soon after October 1178), buried in Lorch Abbey.
9. William (June/July 1175 – soon after October 1178), buried in Lorch Abbey.
10. Philip (February/March 1177 – killed, Bamberg, 21 June 1208) King of Germany in 1198.
11. Agnes (early 1179 – 8 October 1184). She was betrothed to King Emeric of Hungary, but died before they could be married.

Some modern authorities list a daughter named Sophia, who was betrothed to William VI of Montferrat but died before the marriage in 1187. Her existence is first recorded the Thesaurus rerum Suevicarum of Johann Reinhard Wegelin in 1757. If she really existed, she was born between about 1168 and 1180 and was an illegitimate child.

== See also ==
- German monarchs family tree
- Dukes of Swabia family tree
- Operation Barbarossa, the codename of the German invasion of the Soviet Union in 1941, named after the emperor by Hitler

== Notes ==
Frederick Barbarossa House of Hohenstaufen Born: 1122 Died: 1190
Regnal titles
Preceded by Conrad III	King of Germany; 1152–1190	Succeeded by Henry VI
Preceded by Conrad III	King of Italy; 1155–1190	Succeeded by Henry VI
Preceded by Lothair III	King of Arles; 1152–1190	Succeeded by Henry VI
Preceded by Lothair III	Holy Roman Emperor; 1155–1190	Succeeded by Henry VI
Preceded by Frederick II	Duke of Swabia; 1147–1152	Succeeded by Frederick IV
Preceded by Beatrice I as sole ruler	Count of Burgundy; 1156–1190 with Beatrice I	Succeeded by Otto I
