= Beatrice I of Burgundy =

Holy Roman Empress (1156–1184) and Countess of Burgundy (r. 1148–1184)

Beatrice I
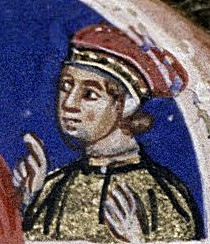

Holy Roman Empress Queen consort of Germany, Italy, and Burgundy
- Reign: 9 June 1156 – 15 November 1184
- Coronation: 1 August 1167, Rome; August 1178, Vienne

Countess of Burgundy
- Reign: 22 January 1148 – 15 November 1184
- Predecessor: Renaud III
- Successor: Frederick I & Otto I
- Co-ruler: Frederick I (1156–1184)
- Born: 1143/5
- Died: 15 November 1184; Jouhe, near Dole
- Burial: Speyer Cathedral
- Spouse: Frederick I, Holy Roman Emperor (m. 1156)
- Issue among others...: Frederick V, Duke of Swabia; Henry VI, Holy Roman Emperor; Frederick VI, Duke of Swabia; Otto I, Count of Burgundy; Conrad II, Duke of Swabia; Philip, King of Germany
- House: Ivrea
- Father: Renaud III, Count of Burgundy
- Mother: Agatha of Lorraine

Beatrice I (1143 – 15 November 1184) was countess of Burgundy from 1148 until her death, and was also Holy Roman Empress by marriage to Frederick Barbarossa. She was crowned empress by Antipope Paschal III in Rome on 1 August 1167, and as Queen of Burgundy at Vienne in August 1178.

== Life ==
Beatrice was the only surviving child of Reginald III, Count of Burgundy and Agatha of Lorraine. She was named after her grandmother. As the only child of her father, she was the heiress of the County of Burgundy, and at the death of her father in 1148 she inherited the vast County of Burgundy and became countess palatine. As such, she was one of the most desired brides in the Empire. Her uncle, William III of Mâcon, who acted as her regent, attempted to deprive her of her rights, and had her imprisoned. A marriage was suggested to Emperor Frederick I, who stopped William.

=== Wedding ===
Frederick I likely suggested the marriage because the County of Burgundy would give him an alternative to the Brenner Pass and a strategically valuable position against Milan, and because of the additional troops of Burgundian knights available for his war.

The wedding between Beatrice and Frederick took on 9 June 1156 at Würzburg. After the wedding, the Bishop of Trier anointed Beatrice queen.

The poem Carmen de gestis Frederici I imperatoris in Lombardia, written about 1162, describes Beatrice upon her wedding day:

"Venus did not have this virgin's beauty,
Minerva did not have her brilliant mind
And Juno did not have her wealth.
There never was another except God's mother Mary
And Beatrice is so happy she excels her."

After the death of William III, Frederick created titles as compensations for his sons Stephen and Girard, and Stephen attended the wedding of Beatrice.

=== Empress ===
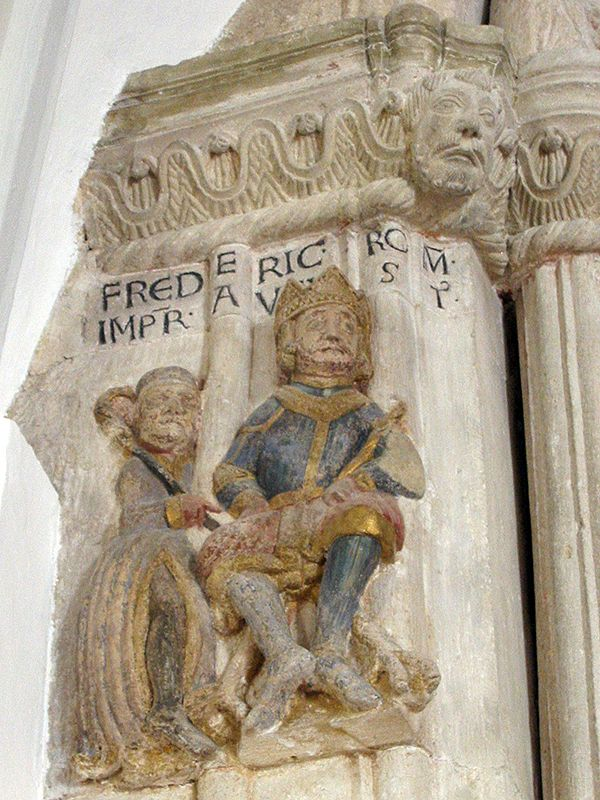
Relief of c. 1161 in Freising Cathedral depicting Beatrice and Frederick.

After their marriage, Frederick took control of the County of Burgundy by the right of his wife and became her co-ruler. Although formally co-rulers, Beatrice's name was seldom included in the charters managing the affairs of Burgundy before the year of 1166, after which more charters were issued in the name of both Beatrice and Frederick as joint rulers of Burgundy. Her actual involvement in the rule of Burgundy is unknown. Her younger son Otto was named the heir to Burgundy, rather than her elder son.

Beatrice accompanied Frederick on his travels and campaigns across his empire. A legend states that in 1158 Beatrice visited Milan where was just conquered by Frederick, but was taken captive in a sally by the enraged Milanese and forced to ride backwards through the city on a donkey in a humiliating manner until getting out. Some sources of this legend indicate that Barbarossa implemented his revenge for this insult by forcing the magistrates of the city to remove a fig from the anus of a donkey using only their teeth. Another source states that Barbarossa took his wrath upon every able-bodied man in the city, and that it was not a fig they were forced to hold in their mouth, but excrement from the donkey. To add to this debasement, they were made to announce, "Ecco la fica" (meaning "behold the fig"), with the faeces still in their mouths. It used to be said that the insulting gesture (called fico), of holding one's fist with the thumb in between the middle and forefinger came by its origin from this event.

Beatrice at least once played a role in warfare: during the Siege of Crema in July 1159, she was able to provide the emperor with badly needed reinforcements from her own county of Burgundy, and arrived to Crema on 20 July of that year in the company of Henry the Lion, archbishop Conrad of Augsburg and 1,200 knights, providing him with the reinforcements he needed.

After Frederick conquered Milan in 1162, the Milanese begged him for mercy, but in vain, so they turned to Beatrice. While Beatrice did not see them, they dropped a cross at her window. According to the Annals of Genoa, while the city of Milan had been destroyed, at the suggestion of Beatrice the lives and properties of the Milanese were saved.

In 1162, Italian chronicler Acerbo Morena, having seen Beatrice at her hometown Lodi, said of Beatrice that she was:

"of medium height, with shining golden hair, a most beautiful face, and white, well shaped teeth; her posture was upright, her mouth small, her countenance modest, her eyes sparkled; she was bashful when charming and flattering words was addressed to her; she had most beautiful hands and a slender figure; she was completely submissive to her husband, feared him as her lord and loved him in every way as her husband; she was literate and devoted to God; and just as she was named Beatrix, so she was in fact happy ['Beata']".

Beatrice was crowned Holy Roman Empress by Antipope Paschal III in Rome on 1 August 1167, after Frederick took Rome. Then there was a plague in the army. When retreating, the emperor and empress were attacked by their enemies at Pontremoli. The empress armed herself with two shields and could hardly escape the arrow rain. It is also said that she held a single shield and a sword in self-defence against them. After they reached Pavia, they were attacked again. The emperor having escaped, the empress stayed in hostile Susa until 1168, presumably imprisoned until permitted to depart, while there is no detailed record of how she was treated during this period.

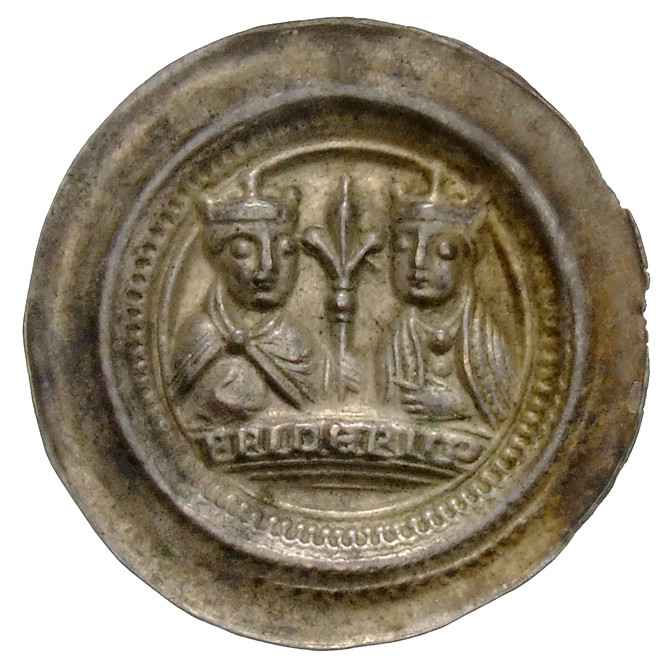
Frederick and Beatrix on a coin, around 1170–1180. The joint depiction of emperor and empress was a novelty in medieval coin iconogaphy in Germany, and apparently introduced under Frederick Barbarossa. Jasperse suggests that the coinage was intended to show the couple as co-rulers.

During the disputed Cambrai episcopal election of 1168, Beatrice supported the election of bishop Peter of Cambrai and at his request successfully blocked the attempt of the archbishop Philip to transfer the bishopric of Cambrai from the metropolitan province of Reims to Cologne, supported by archbishop Christian of Mainz and Henry the Lion.

The relationship between Beatrice and Frederick is traditionally described as happy, and there is nothing to indicate that he was ever unfaithful to her. The English chronicler Ralph of Diceto noted about their relationship, that "Although Frederick was always most constant in adversity, he was nevertheless reputed by many to be uxurious... and seeking how to please her in all things." There is no information about her dower or economy, but it is noted that the recipients of Imperial favours and all individuals who were restored to favor were required to give not only Frederick himself but also Beatrice personal gifts, many of which are recorded, as well as shares of gifts in gold and silver given to the emperor. Archbishop Conrad II of Salzburg promised money and gifts in hope that the empress would help him regain imperial favour through mediation.

For all the five times Frederick set expeditions to Italy, Beatrice was still with the army, but staying in cities rather than barracks, for Frederick wanted to keep her away from murder and violence. In 1174, Frederick plundered Susa as an avengement. According to Godfrey of Viterbo, the empress was pleased for the destruction of the hostile city.

After conquering Tortona, Beatrice saved the city's personal property. During Battle of Legnano, after Henry the Lion refused to help, Frederick turned to Beatrice, but he was finally defeated. The escaped knights assembled at Pavia and told the news of death of the emperor to Beatrice. Beatrice and the whole empire mourned the death of the emperor with herself in mourning clothes, but the emperor came back three days later.

After the Peace of Venice of 1177, according to the treaty, Beatrice would no longer be referred to as Imperatrix ('empress') in the chancery productions, as her coronation as such had been made by an anti-pope and was thus declared nullified. The peace treaty also stipulated that if Frederick died and young Prince Henry succeeded to the throne with the empire actually ruled by Beatrice, Beatrice and her son should still observe it. There is no record about the actual implementation of this provision.

On 30 July 1178, Frederick was crowned king of Burgundy in Arles in Provence. Beatrice was present, but she was not crowned with him. On 15 August 1178, however, Beatrice was crowned queen of Burgundy in Vienne. The reason as to why Beatrice was crowned in Vienne is unknown: it is speculated that this was made as a compensation because the Peace of Venice had formally nullified her coronation as empress, as it had been performed by an anti-pope, but it could also have been to signal her new role as that of resident ruling Palatine Countess of Burgundy, as she seems to have stayed to govern Burgundy from this year forward rather than continue to follow Frederick.

The event signified a change in the life of Beatrice. Frederick left Burgundy later that year, but there is no indication that Beatrice accompanied him back to Germany, or continued to follow him around the Empire. She is confirmed to have visited Germany on only three occasions after this: at feast of St Peter and Paul in 1179, and at the Pentecost courts of 1182 and 1184. Instead, Beatrice seems to have stayed in Burgundy, for the first time governing the county by herself: there are extant charters of her own before 1181, but nine between that year and her death, all of them concerning Burgundian affairs. Many of her Burgundian charters were witnessed by her younger son Otto, who was her designated heir to her own title, Count Palatine of Burgundy, and his teacher, who was evidently there with her. This was in fact an effective separation from Frederick, a reason for the discord hinted in the fact that Beatrice, in contrast to her spouse, continued to refer to herself as empress in her charters. Living in the Middle Ages with strict hierarchy, Beatrice was not indifferent to fame and wealth; like other contemporary empresses, she had strict view of hierarchy and valued reputation.

=== Patron of arts ===
Beatrice was known as a cultivated princess in her lifetime.

Acerbo Morena wrote a praiseful description of Beatrice in 1163, which praised her as a litterata (a woman learned in Latin). According to a sixteenth century account, the author of the Latin epitaph, composed of eight verses, on her tombstone was herself. She was a bibliophile, as shown by the rich psalter she gave Dauphiness Clemence-Margaret.

The early development of the German tradition of minnesang is associated with Beatrice and the French troubadours she brought to Barbarossa's court, especially Guyot de Provins. Gautier d'Arras dedicated the long version of his Ille et Galeron to her.

=== Death ===
In 1184, Beatrice fell ill with an unknown illness at Jouhe and quickly died, aged about 40. She was buried in Speyer Cathedral, but her heart was buried in Jouhe's old Benedictine abbey. Frederick grieved for her early death, and in April 1189, a month before joining the Crusade, he donated to the Church of St. Etienne in Besançon.

== Issue ==
Beatrice and Frederick had the following children:

1. Beatrice (end 1162/early 1163 – at least early 1174/1179). King William II of Sicily first asked for her hand but the marriage negotiations never came through.
2. Frederick V, Duke of Swabia (Pavia, 16 July 1164 – 28 November 1170).
3. Henry VI, Holy Roman Emperor (Nijmegen, November 1165 – Messina, 28 September 1197).
4. Conrad (Modigliana, February 1167 – Acre, 20 January 1191), later renamed Frederick VI, Duke of Swabia after the death of his older brother.
5. ?Judith (October/November 1168 – end 1184). She was betrothed to Richard, Count of Poitou (later King of England) but died before they could be married.
6. Otto I, Count of Burgundy (June/July 1170 – killed, Besançon, 13 January 1200).
7. Conrad II, Duke of Swabia and Rothenburg (February/March 1172 – killed, Durlach, 15 August 1196).
8. Renaud (October/November 1173 – before April 1174/soon after October 1178).
9. William (June/July 1175 – soon after October 1178).
10. Philip (February/March 1177 – killed, Bamberg, 21 June 1208) King of Germany in 1198.
11. Agnes (early 1179 – 8 October 1184). She was betrothed to King Emeric of Hungary but died before they could be married.

== Reception ==
Materials recording Beatrice's political activities are relatively scarce, especially in comparison with those of the Ottonian and Salian empresses and queens. Nevertheless, recent research shows that the empress's role in the contemporary political life was much more important than previously estimated. This is partly demonstrated through the efforts of contemporaries to influence the emperor's decisions through the empress. For example, when Barbarossa refused to listen to Milan's appeal for mercy in 1162, the city turned to Beatrice. She tended to intervene on behalf of people personally connected to her, as well as churches, monasteries, hospitals. Her status as Barbarossa's trusted political partner was also shown in various contemporary representations, including on coins.

== In popular culture ==
Beatrice is a character in Umberto Eco's novel Baudolino, whose (fictional) protagonist is deeply in love with her - a love never consummated except for a single kiss.

In the 2009 movie Barbarossa (also titled Sword of War and Barbarossa: Siege Lord), Beatrice is one of the main characters, played by Cécile Cassel.

== Sources ==
- Commire, Anne; Klezmer, Deborah, eds. (1999). Women in World History: Ba-Brec. Yorkin Publications.
- Freed, John B. (2016). Frederick Barbarossa: The Prince and the Myth. Yale University Press.
- Kinkade, Richard P. (2020). Dawn of a Dynasty: The Life and Times of Infante Manuel of Castile. University of Toronto Press.
- Novobatzky, Peter; Shea, Ammon (2001). Depraved and Insulting English. Orlando: Harcourt. ISBN 9780156011495.
- Walford, Edward; Cox, John Charles; Apperson, George Latimer (1885). "Digit folklore, part II". The Antiquary. XI: 119–123.

Beatrice I of Burgundy House of Ivrea Born: c. 1143 Died: 15 November 1184
Regnal titles
Preceded by Renaud III	Countess Palatine of Burgundy; 22 January 1148 – 15 November 1184 with Frederick I (1156-1184)	Succeeded by Frederick I & Otto I
Royal titles
Vacant Title last held by Richenza of Northeim	Empress consort of the Holy Roman Empire; Queen consort of Italy; 9 June 1156 – 15 November 1184	Vacant Title next held by Constance of Sicily
Vacant Title last held by Adelheid of Vohburg	Queen consort of Arles and Germany; 9 June 1156 – 15 November 1184	Vacant Title next held by Constance of Sicily
