= Frederick V of Swabia =

German noble (1164– c. 1170)

Frederick V of Hohenstaufen (Pavia, 16 July 1164 – c. 1170) was Duke of Swabia from 1167 to his death. He was the eldest son of Frederick I Barbarossa and Beatrice I, Countess of Burgundy.

== Life ==
In April 1165 Frederick was betrothed to Eleanor, daughter of King Henry II of England and his wife Eleanor of Aquitaine. The marriage, however, never took place due to Frederick´s early death.

In August 1167, Duke Frederick IV of Swabia died on an Italian campaign. As the only living son of King Conrad III of Germany (uncle and predecessor of Barbarossa) and without any offspring from his short-lived marriage with Gertrude of Bavaria, with him his line died out and his domains were devolved to Barbarossa. The Emperor appointed the three-year-old Frederick as the new Duke of Swabia, becoming Frederick V.

In June 1169 during the Hoftag in Bamberg, Frederick V's younger brother Henry was elected King of the Romans and crowned on 15 August at Aachen Cathedral. It can be assumed that Frederick V was bypassed from the royal succession because he had a weak constitution since birth and was not expected to survive infancy.

Two medieval sources confirms that Frederick V was still alive when his brother was elected King of the Romans. Since his fiancée Eleanor was married to King Alfonso VIII of Castile in 1170, is assumed that he died in mid-1169 or early 1170.

Frederick V was buried in Lorch Abbey, the royal necropolis of the Staufen dynasty, donated by his great-grandfather Frederick I, Duke of Swabia. In 1475 Abbot Nikolaus Schenk von Arberg had the remains of all the members of the Staufen dynasty buried in Lorch transferred to a late Gothic tombstone, which is now in the central nave of Lorch Abbey.

After his death, Frederick V's name passed to Barbarossa's third son, who was originally called Conrad, who succeeded his late brother as Frederick VI, Duke of Swabia; in this way, the familiar and leading Staufen name Frederick was preserved. Since Otto, the next son of Barbarossa born after Conrad/Frederick VI, was probably born during June–July 1170, Frederick V must have died some time before, otherwise the rather unusual renaming of Conrad would have been without purpose, because the Emperor could simply have called his next son Frederick (instead of Otto).

== Bibliography ==
- Gerhard Baaken: Die Altersfolge der Söhne Friedrich Barbarossas und die Königserhebung Heinrichs VI. in: Deutsches Archiv für Erforschung des Mittelalters, vol. 24 (1968), pp. 46–78.
- Hansmartin Decker-Hauff: Das Staufische Haus. in: Württembergisches Landesmuseum (Hrsg.): Die Zeit der Staufer. Geschichte – Kunst – Kultur. Stuttgart 1977, vol. III, pp. 339–374, p. 355.
- Erwin Assmann: Friedrich Barbarossas Kinder. in: Deutsches Archiv für Erforschung des Mittelalters, vol. 33 (1977), pp. 435–472.
- Tobias Weller: Die Heiratspolitik des deutschen Hochadels im 12. Jahrhundert. Köln 2004, pp. 99–108.

== Ancestry ==
Ancestors of Frederick V of Swabia

8. Frederick I, Duke of Swabia
4. Frederick II, Duke of Swabia
9. Agnes of Germany
2. Frederick I, Holy Roman Emperor
10. Henry IX, Duke of Bavaria
5. Judith of Bavaria
11. Wulfhild of Saxony
1. Frederick V, Duke of Swabia
12. Stephen I, Count of Burgundy
6. Renaud III, Count of Burgundy
13. Beatrix of Lorraine
3. Beatrice I, Countess of Burgundy
14. Simon I, Duke of Lorraine
7. Agatha of Lorraine
15. Adelaide of Leuven

== See also ==
- Dukes of Swabia family tree

Preceded by Frederick IV	Duke of Swabia; 1167–1170	Succeeded by Frederick VI
