= Battle of Iconium (1190) =

Battle of the Third Crusade

- Part of the Third Crusade
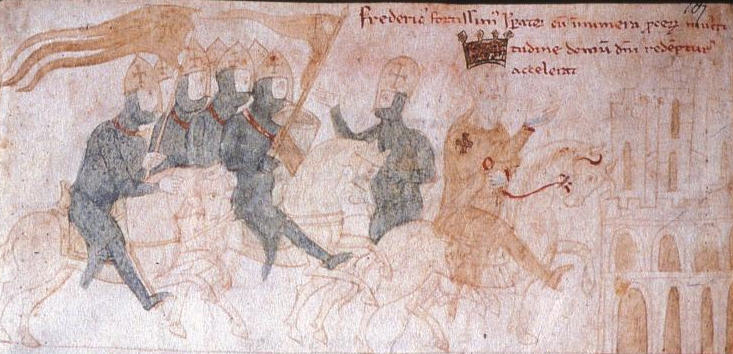
- Barbarossa and Crusaders on the Third Crusade; Liber ad honorem Augusti, 1195
Date	18 May 1190
Location	Iconium (modern day Konya, Turkey) 37.8667°N 32.4833°E
Result	Crusader victory; Main Seljuk army routed; Sultanate of Rûm's capital city sacked; Crusaders take a massive amount of loot; Qutb al-Din replaced by his father, who agrees to let the Germans pass through and sends them hostages

Belligerents
Holy Roman Empire: Duchy of Bohemia; Duchy of Swabia; Kingdom of Hungary	Sultanate of Rûm

Commanders and leaders
Frederick I Holy Roman Emperor; Frederick VI Duke of Swabia; Děpolt II Bohemian Nobleman; Géza; Prince of Hungary	Qutb al-Din

Strength
12,000–20,000; 2,000	Larger than the Crusaders (Note: "After desperate fighting involving the Emperor himself, the Turks outside the city were defeated, apparently against numerical odds, leaving Iconium at the mercy of German pillaging and looting".)

Casualties and losses
Unknown	Field army: 3,000 killed Garrison: all killed or captured 20 nobles taken hostage

The Battle of Iconium (sometimes referred as the Battle of Konya) took place on May 18, 1190, during the Third Crusade, in the expedition of Frederick Barbarossa to the Holy Land. As a result, Iconium, the capital city of the Sultanate of Rûm under Kilij Arslan II, fell to the Imperial forces.

== Background ==
After the disastrous Battle of Hattin and the Siege of Jerusalem in 1187, much of the Crusader states had been seized by Saladin's forces. Pope Gregory VIII called for the Third Crusade to restore the city to Christian hands and help the remaining crusader strongholds. Frederick I, Holy Roman Emperor responded to the call after setting his affairs of state in order and urging Philip Augustus to join as well. He took up the Cross at an imperial diet in Mainz Cathedral on 27 March 1188 and was the first to set out for the Holy Land in May 1189 with an army of 30,000–600,000 men, including 15,000–20,000 knights, according to contemporary accounts. However, most historians think the higher troop estimates are exaggerated and propose 12,000–20,000 men, including 4,000 knights. He was also joined by a contingent of 2,000 men from the Hungarian prince Géza, the younger brother of the king, Béla III of Hungary.

== Crusader army ==
Primary source	Year	Frederick's troop strength	Citation
Gesta Federici I Imperatoris in Expeditione Sacra	1190–1200	90,000	
Itinerarium Peregrinorum et Gesta Regis Ricardi	1189–1192	80,000	
Annales Reicherspergenses	1194	80,000	
Chronica regia Coloniensis	1220	30,000, including 15,000 knights	
Chronicon Montis Sereni	1225–1230	100,000, including 20,000 knights	
Annales Stadenses	1232–1264	600,000	

Modern author	Year	Frederick's troop strength	Citation
Ekkehard Eickhoff	1977	12,000–15,000	
Rudolf Hiestand	1992	13,000, including 4,000 knights	
Bernard and David Bachrach	2016	20,000	

== Prelude ==
After passing through today's Hungary, Serbia, Bulgaria and the Byzantine Empire, the forces arrived in Anatolia, held by the Seljuk Sultanate of Rûm. The Seljuk continuously harassed the Crusader forces, laying ambushes and using hit-and-run tactics. The Crusaders, in turn, launched attacks against whatever Seljuk forces they could find. On 7 May, a 10,000-strong Seljuk army was destroyed by a 2,000-strong mixed infantry-cavalry Crusaders detachment under Frederick VI, Duke of Swabia and the Duke of Dalmatia in the Battle of Philomelion (1190), resulting in 4,174–5,000 deaths for the Seljuks according to the Seljuks' own body count and loss estimates. On 9–10 May, the Crusaders killed 64 Seljuk soldiers. On 12 May, the Crusaders crossed a narrow bridge that left them highly vulnerable, but the Seljuks interfered only minimally, with 20 Seljuks slain that day. More important than the battles was the logistical situation; supplies were running out, and morale was very low. Desertion was frequent among the foot soldiers, as was death from dehydration. Despite this, the crusaders continued their march until they reached the Seljuk capital city of Iconium on 13 May.

On 14 May, the Crusaders found and defeated the main Seljuk army, putting it to rout. Seljuk records attribute the Crusader victory to a devastating heavy cavalry charge which supposedly consisted of 7,000 lancers in white clothing and mounted on snow-white horses. On 15 May, the Crusaders replenished their surviving horses at a bog, but the next day, 60 Crusaders were killed in a Seljuk attack. That same day, the Seljuks offered to let Barbarossa and his army pass through their territory for the price of 300 pounds of gold and "the lands of the Armenians" (the Armenian Kingdom of Cilicia). Barbarossa refused, supposedly saying "Rather than making a royal highway with gold and silver, with the help of our Lord Jesus Christ, whose knights we are, the road will have to be opened with iron".

== Battle ==
While some German commanders advised heading directly through Cilician Armenia to the Levant, Emperor Frederick insisted on taking Iconium to assure his army's food and horse shortage, so on 17 May the Crusaders camped in the "garden and pleasure ground of the sultan" outside the city, where they found plenty of water. Meanwhile, Qutb al-Din regrouped and rebuilt his forces after the first defeat, and retaliated on 18 May. Barbarossa divided his forces into two: one commanded by his son the Duke Frederick of Swabia leading the assault to the city, and the other commanded by himself facing the Turkish field army. The city fell easily; Duke Frederick was able to assault and take the walls with little resistance, and the garrison failed to put up much of a fight before surrendering altogether. The Germans proceeded to massacre the citizenry.

The pitched battle was a much harder fight, and required the presence of the Emperor to defeat the larger Turkish force. He is reported to have said to his soldiers: "But why do we tarry, of what are we afraid? Christ reigns. Christ conquers. Christ commands". Although the fighting was intense, the Germans managed to crush the Turks with relative ease. (Note: "Even an enfeebled and decimated German army had managed to dispose of [the Seljuks of Iconium] with comparative ease") The Seljuks were routed yet again, leaving the city at the mercy of the crusaders. The Germans did not pursue, partly because they had been weakened by a food shortage for the previous two weeks.

== Aftermath ==
After the victory, the Crusaders took booty amounting to 100,000 marks in the city and renewed themselves and their horses with wheat and barley. They rested for five days in the city and camped in the sultan's park on 23 May. There they bought over 6,000 horses and mules at steep prices, as well as an unknown number of donkeys, and stocked themselves with bread, meat, butter and cheese. They continued their march on 26 May, taking 20 high-ranking Turkish nobles as hostages to safeguard themselves. The success of the Imperial army greatly alarmed Saladin, who was forced to weaken his army at the Siege of Acre and send detachments to the north to block the arrival of the Germans. Saladin even dismantled the walls of the Syrian ports lest they be used by the crusaders against him.

But this proved unnecessary as, on 10 June, Barbarossa drowned while crossing the Saleph river. Much of his army disbanded and sailed home through the Cilician and Syrian ports. Barbarossa's son, Frederick VI of Swabia, carried on with the remnants of the German army, along with the Hungarian army under the command of prince Géza, with the aim of burying the emperor in Jerusalem, but efforts to conserve his body in vinegar failed. Hence, his flesh was interred in the Church of Saint Peter in Antioch, his bones in the cathedral of Tyre, and his heart and inner organs in Saint Paul's Church in Tarsus. The German army was then struck with an onset of disease near Antioch and a large number of them died. About 5,000 Imperials and Hungarians under Duke Frederick joined the siege of Acre in October.

=== Casualties ===
The Turks lost 3,000 killed at the field battle on 18 May according to the History of the Expedition of the Emperor Frederick (Historia de Expeditione Friderici Imperatoris), a contemporary German chronicle relying on eyewitness accounts from the participating Crusaders and completed by an Austrian cleric called Ansbert no later than 1200.

== Sources ==
- Asbridge, Thomas (2004). The First Crusade: A New History. Oxford. ISBN 0-19-517823-8.
- Bachrach, Bernard S.; Bachrach, David S. (2017). Warfare in Medieval Europe c.400 – c.1453. Abingdon, Oxon: Routledge. ISBN 978-1138887664.
- Freed, John B. (2016). Frederick Barbarossa : a prince and the myth. New Haven. p. 471. ISBN 978-0-300-22116-9. OCLC 950613726.
- Johnson, Edgar N. (1969). "The Crusades of Frederick Barbarossa and Henry VI". In Setton, Kenneth M.; Wolff, Robert Lee; Hazard, Harry W. (eds.). A History of the Crusades. Vol. II: The Later Crusades, 1189–1311. The University of Wisconsin Press.
- Konstam, A. (2004). Historical Atlas of The Crusades. Mercury Books.
- Loud, G. A. (2010). The Crusade of Frederick Barbarossa: The History of the Expedition of the Emperor Frederick and Related Texts. Farnham, Surrey: Ashgate Publishing. ISBN 9780754665755.
- Phillips, Jonathan (2002). The Crusades 1095-1197. Routledge.
- Tyerman, Christopher (2006). God's War: A New History of the Crusades. Harvard University Press. ISBN 9780674023871.
