= Frederick IV of Swabia =

German noble (1145–1167)

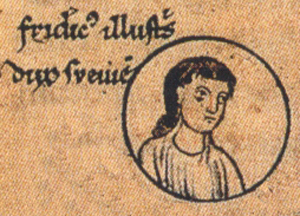
Frederick from a detail of the German royal family tree in the 12th-century Chronica sancti Pantaleonis

Frederick I (1145–1167) was duke of Swabia, succeeding his cousin Frederick Barbarossa in 1152.

He was the son of King Conrad III of Germany and his second wife Gertrude von Sulzbach and thus the direct heir of the crown, had there been true heredity. However, on his death bed, Conrad III allegedly advised the only two persons present, his nephew Frederick Barbarossa and the bishop of Bamberg, to nominate Frederick Barbarossa; and handed the Imperial insignia to him.

Barbarossa wasted no time in getting the Bavarian clerics to endorse him, and had the archbishop of Cologne convene a hurried election. There the electors of the Empire (minus their "primus inter pares", Archbishop Henry of Mainz, an ally of the pope) elected Frederick Barbarossa to be king, instead of his six-year-old cousin Frederick. The younger man became duke of Swabia instead.

Frederick participated in Barbarossa's campaigns in Italy, becoming one of the many casualties of the Imperial army. He succumbed to disease after occupying Rome in 1167. Barbarossa then gave Swabia to his own three-year-old son, Frederick V.

== Marriage ==
Frederick IV married Gertrude of Bavaria. She was a daughter of Henry the Lion and his first wife Clementia of Zähringen. They had no known children.

Gertrude survived him and married Canute VI of Denmark. She died childless.

== See also ==
- Dukes of Swabia family tree

Frederick IV of Swabia House of Hohenstaufen Born: c. 1144 Died: 1167
Preceded by Frederick III Barbarossa	Duke of Swabia; 1152–1167	Succeeded by Frederick V
