= Anscarids =

Noble family of medieval Europe

House of Ivrea Casa di Ivrea Anscarids
- Royal family
- Parent house: Unruochings
- Country: Holy Roman Empire; Kingdom of Italy; Frankish Empire; Papal States; County of Burgundy; Kingdom of Castile, Galicia, León and Kingdom of Aragon
- Founded: 9th century
- Founder: Anscar I
- Final ruler: Italy: Arduin; Burgundy: Joan II; Castile, Galicia and León: Peter (Spain) Union of Castile and Aragon: Joanna the Mad (illegitimate line); Orange: Philibert
- Titles: Pope (elective); King of Italy; King of (Crown of) Castile; King of León; King of Galicia; King of (Crown of) Aragon; Margrave of Ivrea; Count of Burgundy; Count of Galicia; Count of Ponthieu; Count of Mâcon; Holy Roman Empress; Queen of France (Regent)
- Dissolution: 1369; 657 years ago (Castile, Galicia and León); 1555; 471 years ago (Spain)
- Cadet branches: House of Chalon-Arlay, House of Candia; Castilian House of Ivrea; House of Ponce de León (illegitimate); House of Arcos (illegitimate); House of La Cerda; House of Trastámara (illegitimate); House of Noronha (illegitimate); House of Enríquez (illegitimate)

Coat of arms of the count of Burgundy (up to 1231)

The Anscarids (Latin: Anscarii) or the House of Ivrea were a medieval dynasty of Burgundian and Frankish origin which rose to prominence in Northern Italy in the tenth century, briefly holding the Italian throne. The main branch ruled the County of Burgundy from the eleventh to fourteenth centuries and it was one of their members who first declared himself a count palatine. The cadet Castilian branch of Ivrea ruled the Kingdom of Galicia from 1111 and the Kingdoms of Castile and León from 1126 until 1369. The Spanish House of Trastámara, which ruled in Castile, Aragon, Naples, and Navarre at various points between the late 14th and early 16th centuries, was an illegitimate cadet branch of that family.

== Ivrea ==
The founder of the family's fortunes was a petty Burgundian count named Anscar, who, with the support of the powerful archbishop of Rheims, Fulk the Venerable, brought Guy III of Spoleto to Langres to be crowned King of France in 887. Their plot failing, Anscar and his brother accompanied Guy back to Italy with 500 Burgundian troops to seek the throne of Berengar I. In gratefulness to Anscar, Guy created the March of Ivrea to bestow on his Burgundian faithful. Anscar's descendants held the march until 1030. Perhaps the most illustrious scion of the house was his grandson Berengar, the first of three Anscarids to be crowned king of Italy.

Berengar seized the throne in 950 after the death of Lothair II. He was opposed, immediately, by Lothair's widow Adelaide, whom he imprisoned after his attempt to force her marriage to his son, Adalbert II, failed. Emperor Otto I came down the peninsula and forced him to do homage in 952. For the next eleven years, Berengar and his co-crowned son governed Italy until Otto finally formally deposed them in 963.

From 1002 to 1014 Arduin of Italy held the Italian throne in opposition to the German Henry II.

== Counts of Burgundy ==
Adalbert was eventually forced to flee to Burgundy, where he died at Autun. His widow remarried to Otto-Henry, Duke of Burgundy and her son by Adalbert, Otto William, was adopted by the duke. In 982, the County of Burgundy (which will later be known as Free County) is created. Otto-Henri supported Otto-William to be the first count of Burgundy. At the death of the duke, the count inherited the duchy of Burgundy. After the council of Héry (1015), Robert II of France and his son, Henry I of France, confiscated the duchy, leaving only a small portion around Dijon to Otto-William.

The greatest of the free counts was Renaud III, who, from 1127, used the title franc-comte as a sign of independence of German or Imperial authority, but was forced to submit to Conrad III. His daughter and heiress, Beatrice, married Frederick Barbarossa and united the Anscarid inheritance with that of the Hohenstaufen. Burgundy was inherited by her son Otto I, who had an Anscarid name. Thus the county was lost for the House of Ivrea, but it came back when Hugh of Chalon married to Adelaide countess of Burgundy, daughter of Beatrice II of Hohenstaufen (Otto I's daughter). However, in 1303 died Otto IV, Count of Burgundy, last male of the main line and the county inherited to the Dampierre family and finally to the Capetian-Valois dukes of Burgundy.

John I of Chalon-Arlay, a younger brother of Hugh of Chalon, became the founder of the line of Chalon-Arlay. His descendant, John III of Chalon-Arlay married Mary de Beaux princess of Orange, thus the principality was acquired by the family. The last male offspring was Philibert of Chalon who died in 1530. The possessions inherited to son of his sister Claudia of Chalon, i.e. René of Nassau.

== Castilian branch of Ivrea ==
Raymond, fourth son of Count William I of Burgundy, travelled to Castile-León in the late eleventh century and there married Urraca, the future monarch. She was succeeded by their son, Alfonso VII. Subsequent monarchs of Castile and León were their agnatic descendants until the 16th century, although the crown had passed to an illegitimate cadet branch, the House of Trastámara, in the late 14th century.

== Family tree of House of Ivrea ==
Anscar I margrave of Ivrea; House of Ivrea	Fulk; Archbishop of Reims
Adalbert I margrave of Ivrea
Berengar II margrave of Ivrea, king of Lombards in Italy	Anscar II duke of Spoleto
Gerberga of Chalon	Adalbert II co-king of Lombards in Italy	Guy margrave of Ivrea	Conrad margrave of Ivrea	Dado count of Pombia
Otto William count of Burgundy	Arduin margrave of Ivrea, king of Lombards in Italy
Reginald I count of Burgundy
William I count of Burgundy	Guy count of Brionne
Reginald II count of Burgundy	Stephen I count of Burgundy	(Guy); Pope Callixtus II	Raymond count of Galicia	Urraca queen of Castile & León; House of Jiménez
William II count of Burgundy	Reginald III count of Burgundy	William III count of Mâcon	Castilian House of Ivrea
William III count of Burgundy	Beatrice I countess of Burgundy	Stephen II count of Auxonne
Otto I of Hohenstaufen count of Burgundy	Stephen III count of Auxonne
Beatrice II of Hohenstaufen countess of Burgundy	John count of Chalon
Adelaide of Andechs countess of Burgundy	Hugh; Count of Chalon	John I count of Auxerre	John I lord of Arlay; House of Arlay	Hugh archbishop of Besançon
Otto IV count of Burgundy	Reginald
Philip V of France	Joan II countess of Burgundy	Othenin count of Montbéliard
Margaret I Countess of Burgundy
Louis II, Count of Flanders, Count of Burgundy
Margaret II; Countess of Burgundy

== See also ==
- House of Chalon-Arlay, the second ruling house of the Principality of Orange, also a cadet branch of the Anscarids.
- Portuguese House of Burgundy, a cadet branch of the House of Capet, which ruled Portugal contemporaneously with the Castilian House of Ivrea.

== Sources ==
- De Manteyer, Georges. Les origines de la maison de Savoie en Bourgogne (910-1060). Mélanges d'archéologie et d'histoire: 1899.
- Wickham, Chris. Early Medieval Italy: Central Power and Local Society 400–1000. MacMillan Press: 1981.

— Royal house — House of Ivrea
Preceded by (founder)	counts of Burgundy; 982–1190	Succeeded by House of Hohenstaufen
— Royal house — House of Ivrea
Preceded by House of Andechs	counts of Burgundy; 1279–1330	Succeeded by House of Capet
