= Adelaide, Countess of Auxerre =

Adelaide of Auxerre

Countess of Auxerre
- Reign: 1262–1290
- Predecessor: Matilda II, Countess of Nevers
- Successor: William of Chalon
- Born: 1251
- Died: 1290 (aged 38–39)
- Noble family: Burgundy
- Spouse: John I, Count of Auxerre
- Issue: William of Chalon
- Father: Odo, Count of Nevers
- Mother: Matilda II, Countess of Nevers

Adelaide of Auxerre (1251–1290) was ruling Countess of Auxerre in 1262–1290.

== Life ==
Adelaide (also known as Alix or Alais) was a daughter of Eudes of Burgundy and Mathildis II of Bourbon.Mathildis died in 1262 while Adelaide was still a child.

Yolandes husband, John Tristan, Count of Valois , who held the titles in jure uxoris had driving force behind this claim that his wife had a superior right to all her mothers lands as the oldest daughter. However, in 1273 the arbitrators at the Parlement de Paris decided that the inheritance would be split among the sisters.

Yolande received Nevers and the Château de Druyes, while her sister Margaret inherited Tonnerre and Adelaide became Countess of Auxerre, Saint-Aignan and Montjai.

== Marriage ==
On November 1, 1268 at the church in Lantenay, she married John I of Chalon, Lord of Rochefort, son of John and nephew of Guigues VI of Viennois. He had previously been married to Isabelle of Lorraine.

The marriage was most likely arranged by Adelaides grand-father Hugh IV, Duke of Burgundy and was part of a complex political move to gain control over prosperous County of Burgundy which was under control over the Chalon family. The territory was under the control of Johns sister-in-law and widow of his brother Hugh of Chalon, Alix of Meran who had controlled the county on behalf of her your son Otto since the death of her husband in 1266.

Hugh IV was taking advantage of the division within the Chalon family which originated in an inheritance dispute between the numerous offspring of Johns father. By marrying his grand-daughter Hugh IV pledged himself in support of John de Chalons claims.

The couple had one son, William(died 1304).

Adelaide is remembered for her piousness and charity.

Adelaide's husband had a disagreement with the cardinal Erhard de Lessines, which led to her and her husbands excommunication and prohibition on their lands in Auxerre sometime around 1276/77. John sent a complaint to Rome, but the matter was resolved by the death of de Lessines in 1278.

== Death ==
Adelaide died in 1290.
