= Otto I of Merania =

Otto I
- Duke of Merania
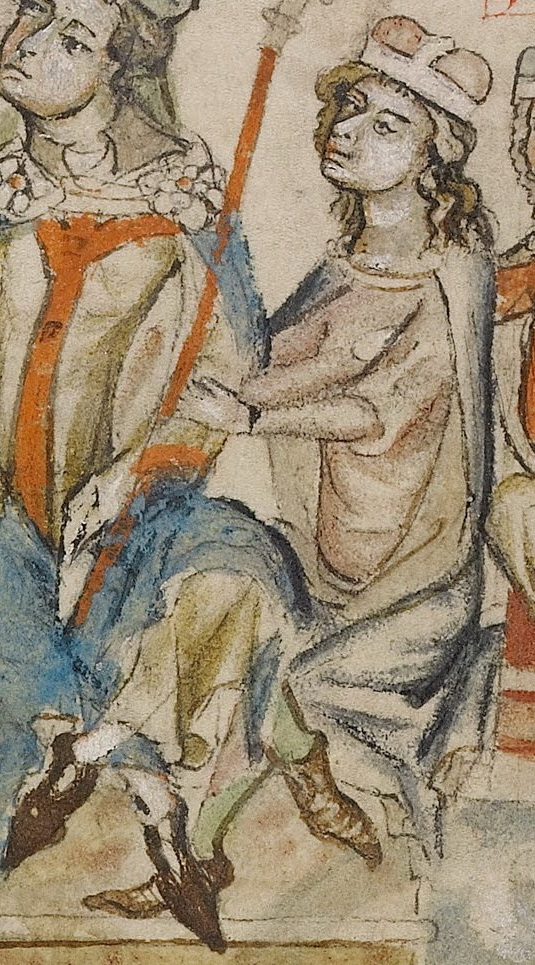
- Otto I of Andechs, Hedwig Codex, 1353
- Born: c. 1180
- Died: 7 May 1234; Besançon, County of Burgundy
- Buried: Langheim Abbey
- Noble family: House of Andechs
- Spouse: Beatrice II, Countess of Burgundy
- Issue: Otto III, Count of Burgundy; Agnes; Beatrix of Andechs-Merania; Margaret; Adelaide, Countess of Burgundy; Elisabeth
- Father: Berthold, Duke of Merania
- Mother: Agnes of Rochlitz

Otto I (c. 1180 – 7 May 1234), a member of the House of Andechs, was Duke of Merania from 1204 until his death. He was also Count of Burgundy (as Otto II) from 1208 to 1231, by his marriage to Countess Beatrice II, and Margrave of Istria and Carniola from 1228 until his death.

== Life ==
He was born about 1180 the eldest son of Duke Berthold of Merania and his wife Agnes of Rochlitz. On the death of his father in 1204, he succeeded him as Duke of Merania, while the margravial titles in Istria and Carniola were inherited by his younger brother Henry II.

On 21 June 1208, Otto married Countess Beatrice II of Burgundy. At the wedding ceremony in Bamberg, her uncle King Philip was murdered, whereafter Otto approached his Welf rival Otto IV. However, the position of the Andechs dynasty was significantly weakened. Otto's brother Henry II was accused of having been involved in Philip's assassination and his estates were seized by Duke Louis I of Bavaria.

Otto assumed the rule in the County of Burgundy, which was contested by the local counts of Auxonne and in the long-time struggle, Otto even had to give the Burgundian lands in pawn to Count Theobald IV of Champagne.

In 1217 Otto had joined Duke Leopold VI of Austria and his brother-in-law King Andrew II of Hungary in the Fifth Crusade. In 1222, a dispute arose with Gerard I de Rougemont, the archbishop of Besançon over the building of a castle which violated a vow taken by his predecessor, Otto I (d.1200). When Otto failed to raze the castle or give an explanation for his actions, the archiepiscopal court excommunicated him and placed his lands under interdict. He immediately turned to his brother Ekbert, bishop of Bamberg, for help in Bamberg. On 20 October 1223, Otto issued five charters consisting of lavish donations to religious communities. In 1228 he inherited the Marches of Istria and Carniola, which his brother Henry II had regained shortly before.

On Beatrice's death in 1231, he ceased to be Count and was succeeded by their son, Otto II. On his own death in 1234, he was also succeeded by Otto.

== Marriage and children ==
Otto firstly married Beatrice of Hohenstaufen and produced the following children with her:

- Otto III of Merania, (c. 1226 – 19 June 1248), succeeded his mother as Count of Burgundy (as Otto III) in 1231, and his father as Duke of Merania as well as Margrave of Istria and Carniola in 1234. He married Elizabeth of Tyrol, daughter of Albert IV, Count of Tyrol. With his death, the House of Andechs became extinct in the male line.
- Agnes of Merania (d. 1260/63), married firstly, Frederick II, Duke of Austria, divorced, and married secondly, Ulrich III, Duke of Carinthia
- Beatrix of Merania (d. after 1265), married Herman II, Count of Weimar-Orlamünde.
- Margaret of Merania (d. 1271), married firstly, Přemysl of Bohemia, a younger son of King Ottokar I of Bohemia, and married secondly, Frederick, Count of Truhendingen.
- Adelaide of Merania (d. 1279), heiress of the County of Burgundy upon her brother's death in 1248, married firstly, Hugh III, Count of Burgundy, married secondly, Philip I, Count of Savoy.
- Elisabeth of Merania, married Frederick III, Burgrave of Nuremberg

After Beatrice's death in 1231, Otto secondly married Sophia of Anhalt, daughter of Henry I, Count of Anhalt. There was no issue from this marriage.

== Sources ==
- Cox, Eugene L. (1974). The Eagles of Savoy: The House of Savoy in Thirteenth-Century Europe. Princeton University Press.
- Kroonen, Guus; Langbroek, Erika; Quak, Arend; Roeleveld, Annelies, eds. (2014). Amsterdamer Beiträge zur älteren Germanistik. Vol. 72. Editions Rodopi.
- Lechner, Karl (1976). Die Babenberger: Markgrafen und Herzoge von Österreich 976–1246. Vienna: Böhlau. ISBN 978-3205085089.
- Lyon, Jonathan R. (2013). Princely Brothers and Sisters: The Sibling Bond in German Politics, 1100-1250. Ithaca and London: Cornell University Press. ISBN 978-0801451300.
- Oliver of Paderborn (1971). Peters, Edward (ed.). Christian Society and the Crusades, 1198-1229: Sources in Translation. Translated by Gavigan, John J. University of Pennsylvania Press.

Otto I of Merania House of Andechs Born: c. 1180 Died: 7 May 1234
Preceded by Berthold	Duke of Merania; 1204–1234	Succeeded by Otto II
Preceded by Beatrice II	Count of Burgundy; 1208–1231 with Beatrice II	Succeeded by Otto II
Preceded by Henry II	Margrave of Istria and Carniola; 1228–1234	Succeeded by Otto II
