= Agnes of Merania (1215–1263) =

German noblewoman

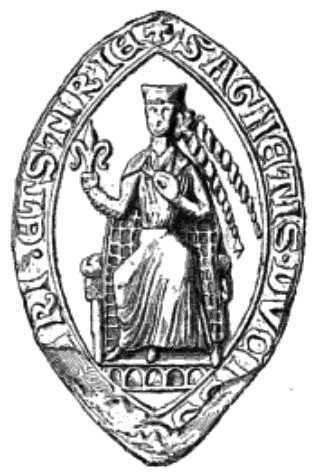
- Anges's effigy on her seal
- Born: c. 1215
- Died: 7 January 1263
- Buried: Stična Abbey
- Noble family: House of Andechs
- Spouses: Frederick II, Duke of Austria; Ulrich III, Duke of Carinthia
- Father: Otto I, Duke of Merania
- Mother: Beatrice II, Countess of Burgundy

Agnes of Merania (c. 1215 – 7 January 1263) was a member of the House of Andechs and an Austrian royal consort. By her two marriages, she was Duchess of Austria from 1230 until 1243 and Duchess of Carinthia from 1256 until her death.

== Family ==
Agnes was a daughter of Duke Otto I of Merania and Countess Beatrice II of Burgundy, a member of the Imperial House of Hohenstaufen. By her father, she was a granddaughter of Agnes of Wettin. Her aunts were Agnes Maria of Andechs-Merania, Queen consort of France, Gertrude of Merania, Queen consort of Hungary, and Hedwig of Silesia, duchess consort of Poland, later canonized as saint. By her mother, Agnes was also a great-grandchild of Emperor Frederick Barbarossa.

Her brother Otto II (d. 1248) succeeded their father as Duke of Merania and Count of Burgundy, while her sister Beatrix (d. 1271) married the Ascanian count Herman II of Weimar-Orlamünde. Her younger sister Adelaide (d. 1279) married Count Hugh III of Chalon and succeeded her brother Otto as Countess of Burgundy.

== Marriages ==
In 1229 she married Frederick of Babenberg, son and heir of Duke Leopold VI of Austria. Her husband, who was known as "the Quarrelsome", had just divorced his first wife Eudokia Laskarina ("Sophia"), a daughter of the Byzantine emperor Theodore I Laskaris, due to childlessness. He succeeded his father as Austrian duke in 1230. Based on the dowry of his wife including large Andechs estates in the March of Carniola and the Windic March, he also began to call himself a "Lord of Carniola" from 1232.

However, Frederick II also divorced Agnes due to childlessness in 1243. The haughty Austrian ruler hurled himself into a fierce border conflict with King Béla IV of Hungary and was killed in the 1246 Battle of the Leitha River. As he left no surviving children, the male line of the Babenberg dynasty became extinct with him. The inheritance fell to his sister Margaret and his niece Gertrude.

From 1250 Agnes is documented as consort of Ulrich of Sponheim, son of Duke Bernhard of Carinthia. Ulrich could succeed Agnes' late husband as Lord in Carniola and became Carinthian duke upon his father's death in 1256. The couple had two children, who nevertheless died young. Agnes died in 1263 and was buried at Stična Abbey in the Windic March (now in Slovenia). After her second husband's death in 1269, her dowry passed to King Ottokar II of Bohemia.
