= Reginald of Burgundy (disambiguation) =

Reginald of Burgundy (died 1321) was the count of Montbéliard from 1283.

Reginald of Burgundy may also refer to:

- Reginald I, Count of Burgundy (r. 1026–57)
- Reginald II, Count of Burgundy (r. 1087–97)
- Reginald III, Count of Burgundy (r. 1127–48)
