= Cherlieu Abbey =

Former Cistercian monastery in France

Coordinates: 47°46′52″N 5°49′32″E

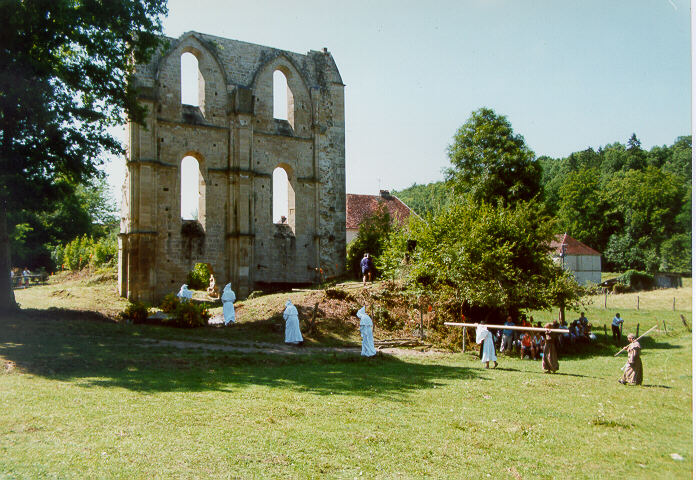
Remains of the abbey church

Cherlieu Abbey (French: Abbaye de Cherlieu; Latin: Carus locus) is a former Cistercian monastery in the commune of Montigny-lès-Cherlieu in Haute-Saône, France, about 37 kilometres west-north-west of Vesoul and about 6 kilometres south-east of Vitrey-sur-Mance in the Forest of Cherlieu (Forêt de Cherlieu).

== History ==
The abbey was founded in 1131 by a community of monks from Clairvaux. With the support of Renaud III, Count of Burgundy, it soon flourished, the monks numbering several hundred. Cherlieu was the mother house of two abbeys in what is now Switzerland - Hauterive (1132) and Haut-Crêt (1143) - as well as others in France: Acey (1136), Le Gard (1137) and Beaulieu-en-Bassigny (1166). Cherlieu owned several granges, wine cellars, mills and ovens.

Adelaide, Countess of Burgundy, was buried here in 1279.

In the 15th century the abbey was attacked by the Écorcheurs; in 1569 it was set on fire by Protestants under Wolfgang von Zweibrücken. It was rebuilt under Abbot Ferdinand de Rye at the beginning of the 16th century. In 1637 it was occupied by Swedish troops. In 1773 the abbot's house was rebuilt.

It was suppressed in 1790 during the French Revolution and the premises were used as a source of building materials.

== Buildings ==
Of the buildings, the kitchen and refectory of the 17th and 18th century survive, although without their roofs, as do some ruins of the cloister from the 15th century. Of the 105-metre-long church, built in transitional style in the 13th century, all that remains is an imposing fragment of the wall of the northern transept. The floor of the church is hidden under a layer of debris.
