= William III of Mâcon =

French nobleman (1088–1156)

William III
- Count of Mâcon
- Coats-of-arms of Mâcon
- Born: 1088
- Died: 1156 (aged 67–68)
- Noble family: House of Ivrea
- Spouse: Adelaide/Alice of Traves
- Issue: Stephen II of Auxonne
- Father: Stephen I, Count of Burgundy
- Mother: Beatrice of Lorraine

William III of Mâcon (1088–1156), also known as William IV of Burgundy, was Count of Mâcon (1102–1156), count of Auxonne (1127–1156), count of Vienne (1148–1156) and regent of the county of Burgundy (1148–1156). He was a younger son of Stephen I, Count of Burgundy and Beatrice of Lorraine. After the death of his brother, Renaud III, he took control of the county of Burgundy in the name of his niece Beatrice. He effectively imprisoned Beatrice and was recognized as count by the emperor Frederick Barbarossa by 1152. He died in 1156 while on Crusade in the Holy Land, and Frederick married Beatrice and took over the county.

William married Adelaide-Pontia (Poncette), heiress of Lord Theobald of Traves, and had the following issue:

- Stephen II, who succeeded to Auxonne, Trier and the title Count of Burgundy. His son was:
  - Stephen III of Auxonne
- Girard I, who succeeded to Mâcon, Vienne. Among his many children were:
  - Beatrice of Viennois (died 8.4.1230) married c. 1175 to Umberto III, Count of Savoy (born 1136 - died 1189).
- Malaspina, possibly illegitimate.
