= Beatrice of Burgundy =

Beatrice of Burgundy (or Beatrix of Burgundy) may refer to:

- Beatrice I, Countess of Burgundy (1143–1184), Countess Palatine of Burgundy (1148–1184) and Holy Roman Empress
- Beatrice II, Countess of Burgundy (1193–1231), Countess Palatine of Burgundy (1205–1231)
- Beatrice of Burgundy, Lady of Bourbon (1257–1310), heiress of all Bourbon estates
