= Robert of Burgundy (died 1317) =

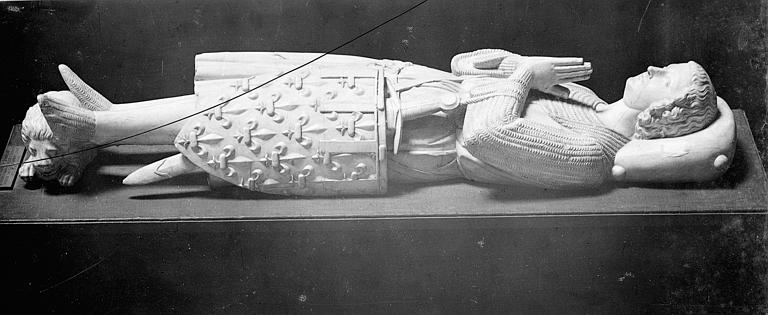
- Born: c.1300
- Died: 3 or 4 September 1317; Paris
- Noble family: House of Ivrea
- Father: Otto IV of Burgundy
- Mother: Mahaut of Artois

Robert of Burgundy (c. 1300 – 3 or 4 September 1317) was the only son of Otto IV, Count of Burgundy and Mahaut, Countess of Artois.

== Life ==
Robert of Burgundy was disinherited before being born. Indeed, by a treaty signed on 2 March 1295, Otto IV had offered his eldest daughter Joan in marriage to Philip, the second son of Philip IV of France, and granted her with a dowry including all his Burgundian possessions.

On 8 May 1306 Robert was betrothed to Eleanor, the youngest daughter of Edward I of England. On 4 October of the same year, Pope Clement V granted a dispensation allowing the union of Robert and Eleanor. Eleanor died prematurely in 1311, putting abruptly an end to the marriage project.

Robert of Burgundy died on 3 or 4 September 1317 at the Hôtel d'Artois in Paris and was buried in the church of the Cordeliers, before his tomb was transferred to the royal necropolis of the Basilica of Saint-Denis during the 19th century.
