= List of counts of Mâcon =

This article is a list of the counts of Mâcon. In medieval France, the county of Mâcon was a county centred on the town called Mâcon in the southern half of medieval Burgundy, in what is now Saône-et-Loire (Mâconnais).

== Carolingian counts ==
- fl. 834–845: Guerin of Provence
- 869–883: Theodoric († 883), son of Guerin
- ???-877: Ecchard of Mâcon († 877) (Carolingian Nibelungids family)
- 877–887: Boso of Provence († 887) (family of the Bosonid counts of Provence)
- 884–886: Bernard Plantevelue († 886) (family of the comtes d'Auvergne)
- 886–918: William I of Aquitaine, known as the Pious († 918), son of the former, count of Auvergne and duke of Aquitaine
- 918–926: William II of Aquitaine († 926), nephew of the former, count of Auvergne and duke of Aquitaine
- 926–928: Acfred of Aquitaine († 928), brother of the former, count of Auvergne and duke of Aquitaine

The counts of Auvergne installed the viscounts at Mâcon. The centre of power of the dukes of Aquitaine, then the struggles for control of Aquitaine on Acfred's death, made the viscounts take a comtal title.

- 884-???: Liétald, viscount of Mâcon
- ???-915: Ranoux, viscount of Mâcon, probably a close relation of the former
- 915-943: Aubry I of Mâcon († 943), viscount of Narbonne, entitled comte de Mâcon in 932, married Atallana, daughter of Racon
- 943–966: Liétald II of Mâcon († 966), son of the former, married Ermengearde, sister of Gilbert of Chalon, comte principal of Burgundy
- 966–982: Aubry II of Mâcon († 982), son of the former, married Ermentrude of Roucy

== Comtal house of Burgundy ==
- 982–1002: Otto-William of Burgundy (958 † 1026) count of Burgundy, son of Adalbert of Italy and of Gerberge of Chalon
- 1002–1004: Guy I of Mâcon († 1004), count of Mâcon, son of the former
- 1004–1049: Otto II of Mâcon († 1049), count of Mâcon, son of the former: married Elisabeth of Vergy
- 1049–1065: Geoffroy of Mâcon († 1065), count of Mâcon, son of the former: married Béatrice
- 1065–1078: Guy II of Mâcon († 1109), count of Mâcon, son of the former. In 1078, he became a monk at Cluny Abbey and ceded Macon to his cousin William I of Burgundy
- 1078–1085: William I of Burgundy († 1087), count of Burgundy and of Macon, cousin of the former, son of Renaud I of Burgundy and of Alice of Normandy, grandson of Otto-William

- 1085–1097: Renaud II of Burgundy († 1097), count of Burgundy and of Macon, eldest son of the former.
- 1097–1125: William II of Burgundy (c. 1075 – 1125), known as the German, de facto count of Burgundy (1097–1125), count of Mâcon (1097), son of the former
- 1125–1127: William III of Burgundy, known as the Child (died in 1127 before having ruled), son of the former
- 1085–1102: Stephen I of Burgundy († 1102), count of Mâcon and of Vienne, second son of William I, married Béatrice of Lorraine
- 1102–1148: Renaud III of Burgundy († 1148), count of Mâcon and of Burgundy, eldest son of the former, married Agatha of Alsace
- 1102–1155: William III of Mâcon († 1155), count of Mâcon, of Auxonne and of Vienne, second son of Stephen I, married Poncette of Trèves

- 1157–1184: Géraud I of Mâcon (1142 † 1184), count of Mâcon and of Vienne, son of William III of Mâcon, married Maurette de Salins
- 1184–1224: William IV of Mâcon († 1224), count of Mâcon, of Auxonne and of Vienne, eldest son of the former, married Poncia of Beaujeu, then married Scholastique, daughter of Henry I of Champagne
- 1224–1224: Géraud II of Mâcon († 1224), count of Mâcon and of Vienne, son of the former and of Scolastique de Champagne, married Alix Guigonne, daughter of Guigues III of Forez
- 1224–1239: Alix of Mâcon († 1260), countess of Mâcon and of Vienne, daughter of the former, married John of Dreux († 1239)
- 1239: on the death of her husband, countess Alix of Mâcon sold the counties of Vienne and Mâcon to the crown of France.
