= Odo I of Champlitte =

Odo/Eudes I de Champlitte the so-called Champenois, (1123 - d. 1187) of the House of Blois and its cadet branch, the house of Champlitte. was Lord of Champlitte, Viscount of Dijon, and also a claimant to the title of Count of Champagne. He was the son of Hugh, Count of Champagne, Count of Champagne and Isabella of Burgundy, daughter of Stephen I, Count of Burgundy.

== Biography ==
At his birth in 1123, Hugh, Count of Campagne did not recognize his legitimacy and persecuted him and his mother. In 1125 Hugh decides to become a Knight Templar. He then rejected Odo I and bequeathed the county of Campagne to his nephew Thibaut/Theobald II, Count of Champagne.

Odo I was then taken over by his maternal family and became lord of Champlitte, which he probably inherited from his mother Isabella, or from the generosity of his uncle Renaud III, Count of Burgundy. It is also in the possession of Por-sur-Chaon and Champvans.

He will be nicknamed Eudes le Champenois in memory of his birth place and the claims he had in the county of Campagne.

Around 1137, his marriage to Symbille de La Ferte brought the title of Viscount of Dijon to the branch of Champlitte-Potagier.

In 1143 his claims seem to have been realized: Louis VII of France was at war with Theobald II, Count of Campania. The king captured the city of Vitry and gave Odo I possession of that city, probably with the aim of subsequently granting him the whole county of Campagne. However, peace between the king and the count was restored, and Odo I was forced to surrender the city.

In 1148, with the death of his uncle Renaud III of Burgundy, the county of Burgundy returned to Beatrice I of Burgundy, who eight years later married Emperor Frederick I of Germany. Odo I became then cousin by marriage of the German emperor, who granted him the usufruct of three fiefs from the estate of Renaud III: Quingey, Isle-sur-le-Doubs and Loye.

In 1171 he accompanied the Hugh III Duke of Burgundy and the Count of Sancers Etienne/Stephen I Count of Sancers on a pilgrimage to the Holy Land.

== Family and issue ==
Around 1137 he married Sibylle de La Ferte, daughter of Hugh of Beaumont and Mathilde de La Ferte (and niece of Josper II de La Ferte, Viscount of Dijon, and possibly granddaughter of Josper I Seneschal of Hugh I Count of Campanias), by whom he has six known children [1]:

- Odo/Eudes II (d. 1204), lord of Champlitte.
- William (1160s-1209), lord of Champlitte, 1st prince of Achaia.
- Pons born d. 1151.
- Louis Rev. d. 1202.
- Hugh av. d. 1196.
- Beatrice d. c. 1218, married firstly in 1170 to Simon IV de Clermont, and secondly in 1196 to Geofroi de Baudemon, lord of Deuilly.

== Sources ==
- Marie Henry d'Arbois de Jubainville, History of the Dukes and Counts of Champagne, 1865.
- Ernest Petit, Histoire des ducs de Bourgogne de la race capétienne, 1888.
