= William I of Burgundy =

Count of Burgundy (1020–1087)

William I
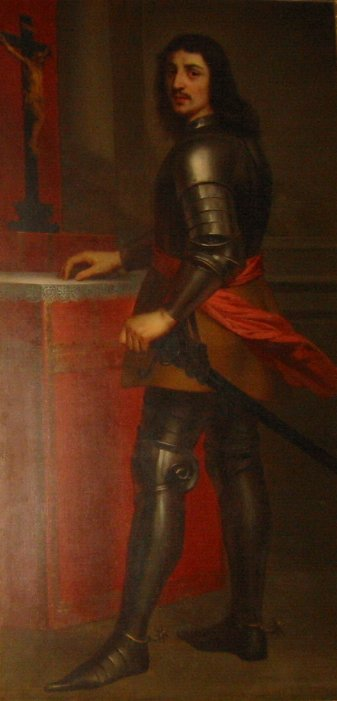
- Born: 1020
- Died: 12 November 1087; Besançon
- Buried: Besançon Cathedral
- Noble family: Ivrea
- Spouse: Stephanie (a.k.a. Etiennette)
- Issue: Renaud II, Count of Burgundy; Stephen I, Count of Burgundy; Raymond of Burgundy; Sybilla of Burgundy; Gisela of Burgundy; Clementia of Burgundy; Guy of Vienne, (became Pope as Callixtus II)
- Father: Renaud I, Count of Burgundy
- Mother: Alice of Normandy

William I (1020 – 12 November 1087), called the Great (le Grand or Tête Hardie, "the Stubborn"), was Count of Burgundy from 1057 to 1087 and Mâcon from 1078 to 1087. He was a son of Reginald I, Count of Burgundy and Alice of Normandy, daughter of Richard II, Duke of Normandy. William was the father of several notable children including Pope Callixtus II.

In 1057, William succeeded his father and reigned over a territory larger than that of the Franche-Comté itself. In 1087, he died in Besançon, Prince-Archbishopric of Besançon, Holy Roman Empire—an independent city within the County of Burgundy. He was buried in Besançon's Cathedral of St John.

William married a woman named Stephanie (a.k.a. Etiennette).

William and Stephanie had:

- Renaud II, William's successor; died on First Crusade
- Stephen I, successor to Renaud II; died on the Crusade of 1101
- Raymond of Burgundy, who married Urraca of León and Castile and thus was given the government of Galicia (Spain)
- Sibylla of Burgundy, Duchess of Burgundy
- Gisela of Burgundy, Marchioness of Montferrat
- Clementia married Robert II, Count of Flanders and was regent during his absence. She married, secondly, Godfrey I, Count of Leuven
- Guy of Vienne, elected pope, in 1119 at the Abbey of Cluny, as Callixtus II
- William
- Eudes
- Hugh III, Archbishop of Besançon
- Stephanie married Lambert, lord of Peyrins (brother of Adhemar of Le Puy)
- Ermentrude, married (in 1065) Theodoric I, Count of Montbéliard

== Sources ==
- Bouchard, Constance Brittain (1987). Sword, Miter, and Cloister: Nobility and Church in Burgundy, 980-1198. Cornell University Press. ISBN 0-8014-1974-3.
- Cate, James Lea (1969). "The Crusade of 1101". In Setton, Kenneth Meyer; Baldwin, M. W. (eds.). A History of the Crusades: The First Hundred Years. The University of Wisconsin Press.
- Keats-Rohan, K. S. B. (1993). "The Prosopography of Post-Conquest England: Four case studies". Medieval Prosopography. 14 (1 (Spring)): 1–52.
- Stroll, Mary (2004). Calixtus II (1119-1124): A Pope Born to Rule. Brill. ISBN 90 04 13987 7.
- Portail sur Histoire Bourgogne et Histoire Franche-Comté, Gilles Maillet.

Regnal titles
| Preceded by Reginald I | Count of Burgundy; 1057–1087 | Succeeded by Reginald II |
| Preceded by Guy II | Count of Mâcon; 1078–1087 | Succeeded by Reginald II |
