= William II of Burgundy =

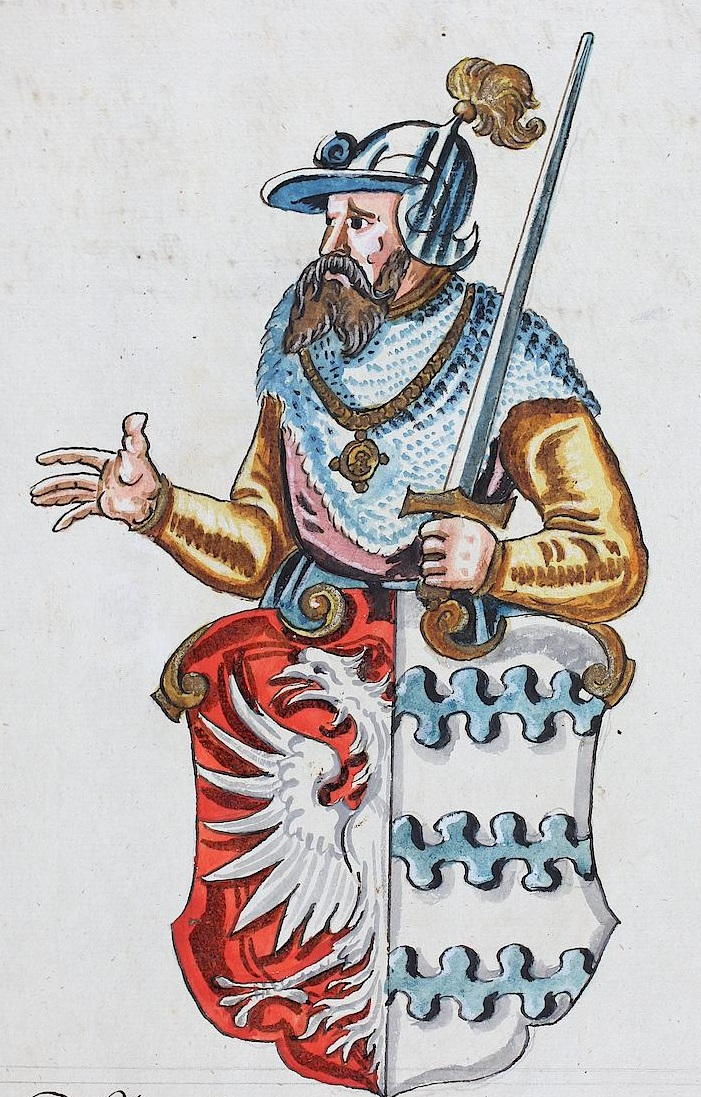
William II of Burgundy

William II of Burgundy (c. 1085 – 1125), known as the German, was a nobleman.

== Life ==
William was the only son of Reginald II, Count of Burgundy, and nephew of Pope Callixtus II via his father, whilst his mother, Countess Régine of Oltingen, was the daughter of Conon, Count of Oltingen, Bale in Swiss-Germany. He was brought up by his maternal grandfather and was given a German education, hence his nickname.

On Reginald's death in 1095 during the First Crusade aged 41, William succeeded him jointly with his uncle Stephen as count of Burgundy and count of Mâcon. He married Agnes, daughter of Berthold II of Zahringen. His son William III was assassinated during his youth in 1127, and Stephen I's son Renaud was made count.

William II died in 1125, the victim of a plot against him by his barons.
