= Reginald II =

Reginald II may refer to:

- Reginald II of Burgundy (1061–1097), Count Palatine of Burgundy and Count of Mâcon from 1087
- Reginald II of Bar (died 1170), Count of Bar and Lord of Mousson from 1149
- Reinald II of Guelders (c. 1295–1343), called "the Black", Count of Guelders from 1318, Duke of Guelders from 1339, and Count of Zutphen from 1326 to 1343
