= Hugh III of Broyes =

12th-century nobleman and crusader

Hugh III, Lord of Broyes (c. 1120 – c. 1199) was Lord of Broyes at the end of the 11th century. He was the son of Simon I of Broyes and his wife Félicité de Brienne, daughter of Erard I, Count of Brienne.

Simon, Hugh's father, had three castles: at Broyes, Châteauvillain, and Beaufort. Hugh received the castles at Broyes and Chateauvillan, with the other going to his brother, who adopted the toponym of the lordship he received, and is known as Simon of Beaufort.

Hugh III participated in the Second Crusade.

== Marriage and children ==
Hugh III favored his residence at Châteauvillain. His first wife was Stephanie de Bar, Lady of Commercy, daughter of Renaud I Count de Bar et de Mousson and his second wife Gisèle of Vaudémont. His second wife was Elisabeth (Isabelle) de Dreux, Lady of Baudémont, daughter of Robert I, Count of Dreux and his third wife was Agnes de Baudemont.

Elizabeth was in her mid-teens when they married, and their marriage lasted 21 years. She did not remarry and lived to at least 1228.

With his first wife, Hugh had four children:

- Simon de Broyes (1145-after May 1208). Married Nicole of Salins.
- Emmeline de Broyes
- Sophie de Broyes
- Agnes de Broyes, married first Simon of Brixey, Lord of Bourlémont, and second, Henry of Fouvent

With his second wife, Hugh had two children:

- Emmeline de Broyes (-d perhaps July 1248 or April 1249). Married Odo II of Champlitte and second Erard II of Chacenay
- Simon de Broyes (−1260), married Alix of Luzy, daughter of Dalmas of Luzy and his wife Beatrix de Vignory (Beatrix later married Enguerrand III, Lord of Coucy).
