= Hézelon de Liège =

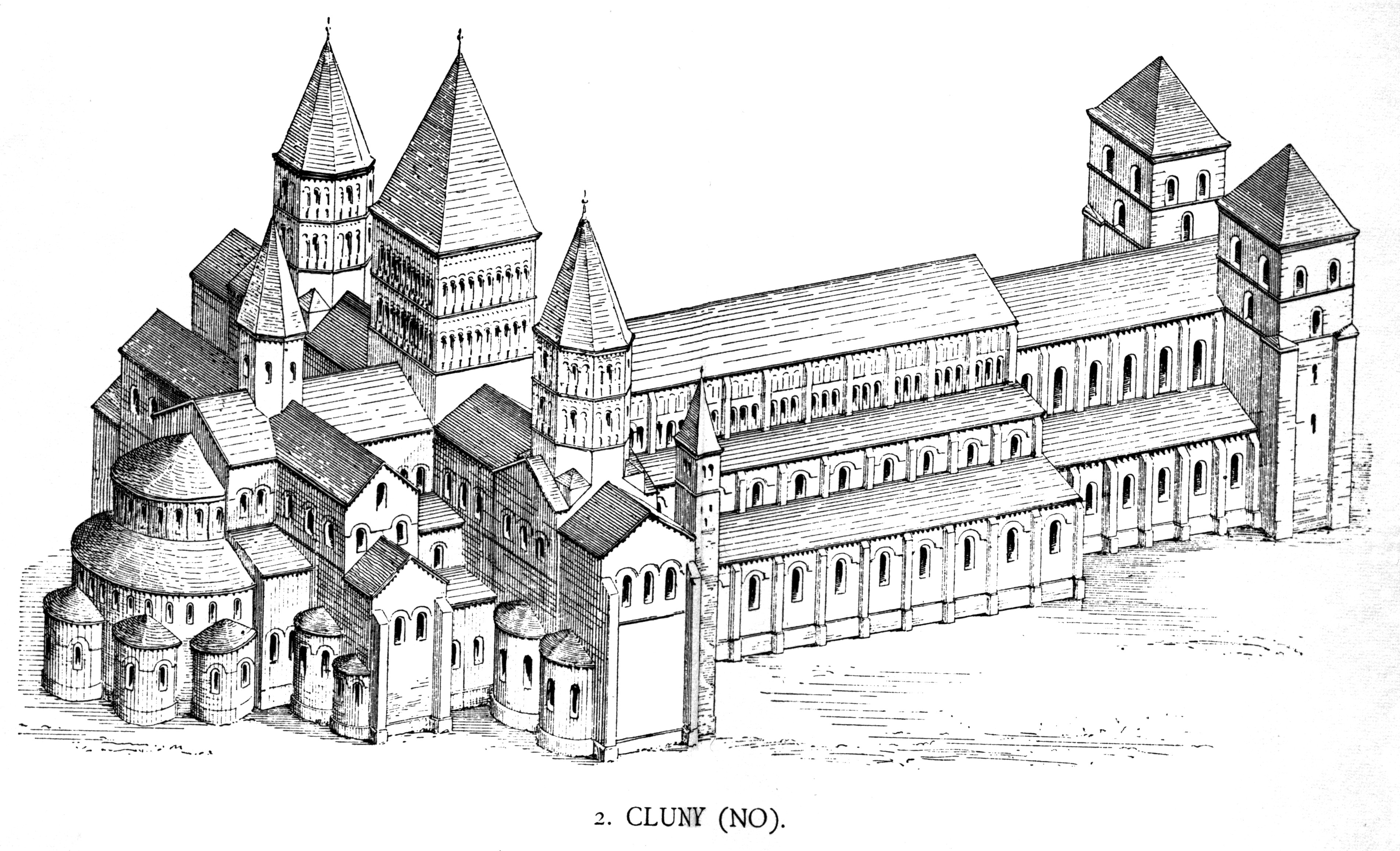
Reconstruction of the now vanished church (Cluny III) of Cluny Abbey for which Hézelon was the architect.

Hézelon de Liège (also Etzelo; floruit second half of the 11th century – first half of the 12th century) was a church official and architect, who at Cluny Abbey oversaw the construction of the abbey church begun in 1088. He came from an aristocratic background and probably received a formal education, in addition to being trained well enough in mathematics and technical skills to be able to work as an architect.

== Biography ==
Hézelon came from an aristocratic family. His father was a count and his uncle on his mother's side was Conrad I, Count of Luxembourg. His sister appears to have been Regina of Oltingen; she married the Count of Burgundy, Reginald II, who was the brother of Pope Callixtus II.

Hézelon was a canon at either Liège Cathedral or one of the seven collegiate churches of Liège. He is mentioned by Peter the Venerable, who in a letter to Prince-Bishop Albero I of Louvain calls him by the Latin title magister, indicating a certain level of formal education. He may have embraced Benedictine observance while in Liège, and in the city also clearly achieved training in mathematics and technical skills which enabled him to work as an architect. Hildebert of Lavardin further mentions that Hézelon wrote a text on the life of Saint Hugh of Cluny, further indication of a certain level of education.

He was called to Cluny Abbey to oversee the construction of the third abbey church Cluny III which was begun in 1088. It is also possible that he contributed to the building project by collecting funds.
