= Erard II =

Erard II may refer to:

- Erard II, Count of Brienne (died in 1191)
- Erard II of Chacenay (died in 1236)
- Erard II von der Mark (1365–1440)
