= Hugh of Champagne =

Late 11th century French Nobleman

Hugh
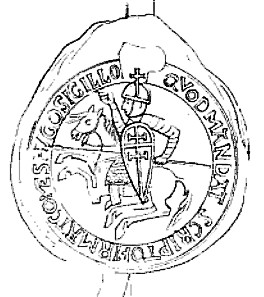
- Seal of Hugh

Count of Champagne
- Tenure: 1102 - 1125
- Successor: Theobald II
- Born: c. 1074
- Died: c. 1130 (aged 56)
- Noble family: House of Blois
- Spouses: Constance of France; Isabelle de Bourgogne-Comté
- Issue: Odo (disowned)
- Father: Theobald III
- Mother: Adele of Valois

Hugh (c. 1074 – c. 1130) was a French noble who was the first count of Champagne. He was known for donating the valley that was used as the site for the Clairvaux Abbey and going on several pilgrimages to the Holy Land. During his second visit, Hugh de Paynes, a knight in his service, stayed in Jerusalem and established the Knights Templar. Hugh later gave up his wealth and lands to join the Templar Order.

== Biography ==
Hugh was the third son of Count Theobald III of Blois and Countess Adele of Valois, bearing the title count of Bar-sur-Aube. His older brother Count Odo died in 1093, leaving him master of Troyes, where he centred his court, Bar-sur-Aube and Vitry-le-François. In this way the three contiguous countships that formed the core of an emerging Champagne were united in his person, and though he preferred "Count of Troyes", the oldest of his lordships and site of the only bishopric in his domains, many contemporary documents call him the count of Champagne, the title preferred by his descendants.

His first recorded act, a monastic gift in 1094, became the oldest document of the comital archive. The act of his that resonated longest in history was his grant of lands in 1115 to the monk Bernard of the reformed Benedictines at Cîteaux—the Cistercians—in order to found Clairvaux Abbey, a Cistercian monastery at Clairvaux (in the present Ville-sous-la-Ferté), in a wild valley of a tributary of the Aube, where Bernard was appointed abbot and became famous as Bernard of Clairvaux. Hugh's charter makes over to the new foundation Clairvaux and its dependencies, fields, meadows, vineyards, woods and water. A deeply affectionate letter from Bernard to Hugh survives, written in 1125, as Hugh went off for a third time to fight in the Holy Land, joining the Knights Templar, leaving his pregnant wife, and disinheriting his son Odo – according to later sources, Hugh believed himself impotent and never acknowledged his son. Instead, he transferred his titles to his nephew, who became Theobald II of Champagne. Odo's two sons, Odo II of Champlitte and William of Champlitte were important figures in the Fourth Crusade.

Hugh married first Constance, daughter of King Philip I of France and Bertha of Holland. Their only child, a son called Manasses, died young. He married second Isabella, daughter of Stephen I, Count of Burgundy and niece of Pope Callixtus II and they had issue:

- Eudes/Odo I, married to Sibylle de La Ferte-sur-L'Aube and had two sons:
  - Odo II of Champlitte died 1204, one of the leaders of the IV Crusade.
  - William I 1160s - 1209, prince of Achaea and founder of the Principality.

When Hugh became a Knight Templar himself in 1125, the Order comprised few more than a dozen knights, and the first Grand Master of the Templars was a vassal of his, Hugues de Payens, who had been with him at Jerusalem in 1114. While in the kingdom of Jerusalem, Hugh appeared with the king, Baldwin II, in two documents, but there is no trace of him after 1130.

Hugh was also the generous patron of the abbeys of Montieramey Abbey and of Molesme, making grants from his castle of Isle-Aumont, south of Troyes. In a surviving letter to him from Ivo of Chartres (Letter CCCXLV), the Bishop of Chartres reminds him of his obligations of marriage, perhaps to deter him from making vows of continence.

== Sources ==
- Evergates, Theodore, ed. (1999). Aristocratic Women in Medieval France. University of Pennsylvania Press.

Preceded by Odo V	Count of Champagne; 1093–1125	Succeeded by Theobald II
