= County of Burgundy =

Medieval county of the Holy Roman Empire (982-1678)

Free County of Burgundy Comitatus Burgundiae (Latin) Franche Comté de Bourgogne (French) Freigrafschaft Burgund (German)
- 982–1678
- Heraldic flag since the 16th century Coat of arms

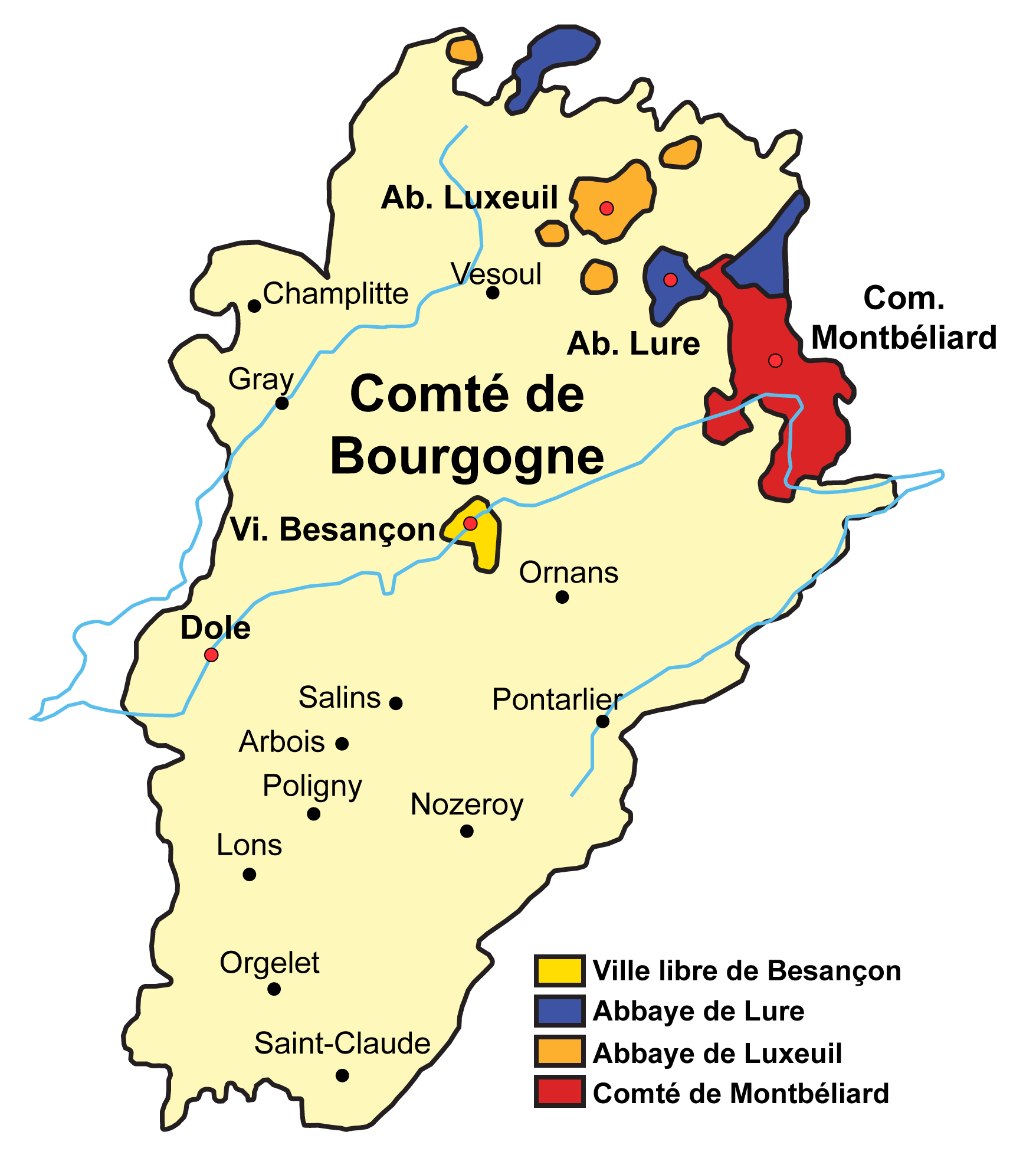
- County of Burgundy at the end of the 15th century.
- Status: Part of Upper Burgundy and the Kingdom of Arles, then state of the Holy Roman Empire
- Capital: Dole
- Religion: Catholicism
- Government: Feudal monarchy (County)
- Historical era: Middle Ages; Early modern period
  - Otto-William, Count of Burgundy: 982
  - Emperor Conrad II, King of Burgundy (Arelat): 1033
  - Personal union of Philip the Bold with Duchy of Burgundy: 1384
  - Ceded to Habsburgs: 1493
  - Joined Burgundian Circle: 1512
  - Ceded to France: 1678
Preceded by	Succeeded by
Kingdom of Arles	Franche-Comté (France); Free Imperial City of Besançon

The Free County of Burgundy (Latin: Comitatus Burgundiae); French: Franche Comté de Bourgogne; German: Freigrafschaft Burgund) was a medieval and early modern feudal polity ruled by a count from 982 to 1678. It became known as Franche-Comté (the Free County) (Note: from French: franc comte meaning 'free count') and was located in the modern region of Franche-Comté. It belonged to the wider historical region of Upper Burgundy, and bordered the Duchy of Burgundy to the west.

Its territory had initially been part of the Kingdom of Upper Burgundy (888–933) and then the united Kingdom of Burgundy, later known as the Kingdom of Arles. The county was formed in 982 by count Otto-William, encompassing his domains in northern parts of the Burgundian realm. In 1032, the Kingdom of Arles was inherited by Conrad II, Holy Roman Emperor, who incorporated the Kingdom, including the County of Burgundy, into the Holy Roman Empire (HRE).

As a state of the Holy Roman Empire, the county was granted a high degree of autonomy. The largest city, Besançon, was granted the status of free imperial city. The rest of the county was given imperial immediacy (making it an imperial county) and its rulers were given the title of Freigraf (German for 'free count') from which the French and English names of the county are derived.

From 1295 the county began to fall under the increasing influence of France and the House of Burgundy, which ruled the neighboring duchy of the same name. From 1330 to 1361 and again from 1405 to 1477, there was a personal union between the county (part of the HRE) and the adjacent duchy (part of France). In 1477, it was occupied by France, but already in 1493 the county was transferred to the House of Habsburg, which ruled it until it was finally conquered by France in 1674. French rule was made permanent by the Treaties of Nijmegen in 1678.

== Formation within the Kingdom of Arles ==
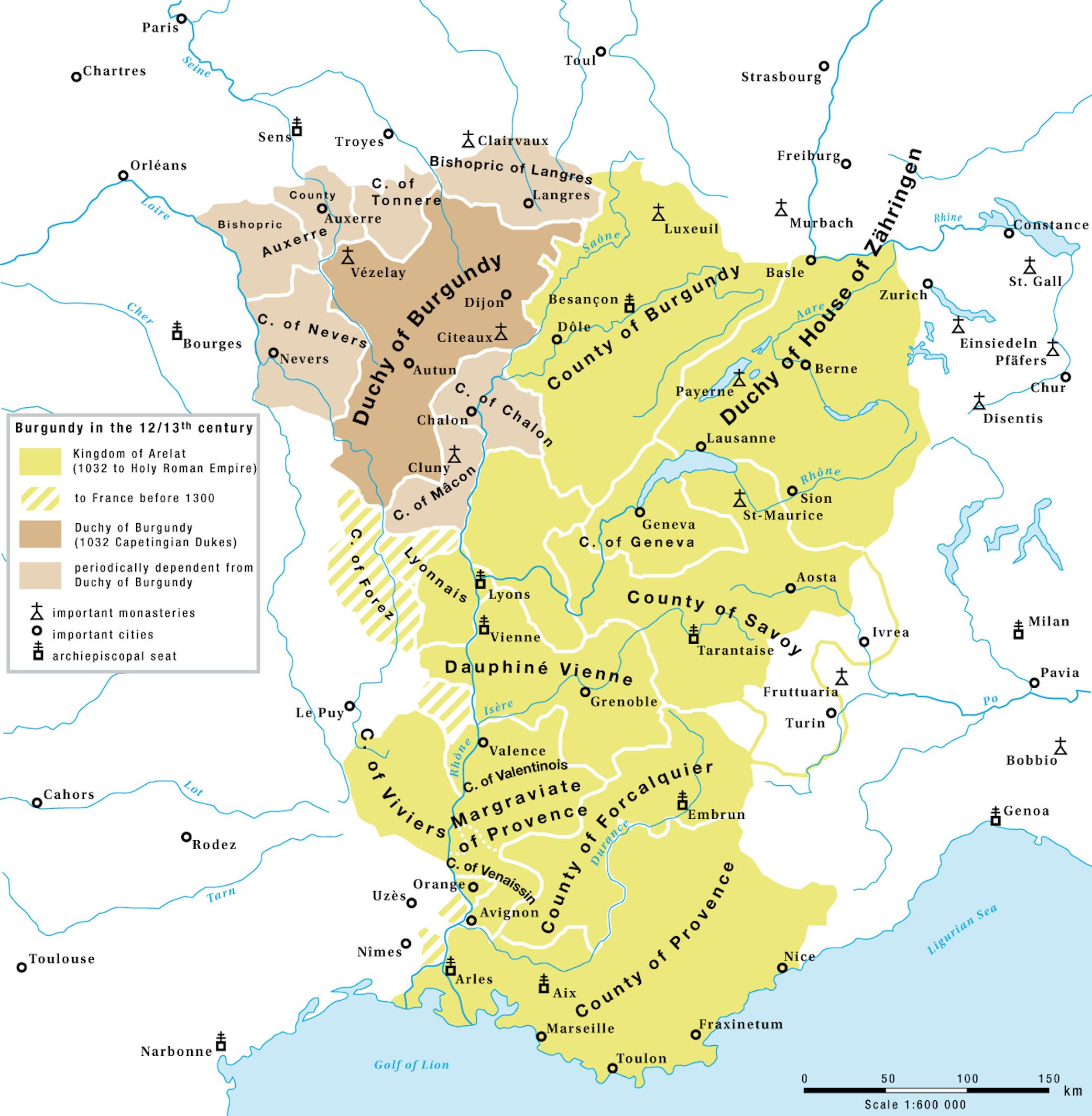
The Kingdom of Arles (yellow) from 1002–1032. The County of Burgundy is in the upper centre. The adjacent duchy is also shown (brown).

The area previously formed part of the Kingdom of the Burgundians, which had been annexed by the Franks in 534 and incorporated into the Kingdom of the Franks. The Frankish Empire was partitioned in 843 by the Treaty of Verdun, with the area west of the Saône river being allotted to West Francia, and later formed the Duchy of Burgundy, while the southern and eastern parts of the former Burgundian kingdom fell to Middle Francia under Emperor Lothair I. This Middle Frankish part became the two independent entities of southern Lower Burgundy in 879 and northern Upper Burgundy in 888. The region that would later become the Free County of Burgundy was then included in Upper Burgundy, centred around the city of Besançon. In 933, with the collapse of the Carolingian Empire, Lower and Upper Burgundy were re-united under King Rudolph II, thus forming the united Burgundian kingdom, that became known as the Kingdom of Arles (Arelat).

In 981-982, Otto-William (son of Adalbert of Lombardy) married Ermentrude of Roucy. Ermentrude was a widow, whose previous husband had been count of Mâcon (in the Duchy of Burgundy) and controlled additional lands around Besançon and Dole. These lands were then ruled by Otto-William in right of his wife. Otto-William was already the adopted heir of Henry I, Duke of Burgundy, so expected to inherit the entire duchy when Henry died. The lands outside the duchy, that Otto-William had acquired through Ermentrude, were organised as the new County of Burgundy.

Henry I died in 1002, at which point Otto-William claimed the Duchy of Burgundy. However, king Robert II of France refused to recognise the adoption and claimed the duchy as the nephew of Henry I. This started a war between the two claimants. After a few years of conflict, Robert II prevailed in the duchy; he would later grant it to his son Robert I, Duke of Burgundy, keeping the Crown of his elder son Hugues. Otto-William remained in control of the county of Mâcon, and therferore strengthened its grip in the County, fief of the Kingdom of Burgundy.

Otto-William and Ermentrude became the progenitors of the Anscarid dynasty. The development of commercial routes across the Jura Mountains and the development of salt mines assured the prosperity of the county, and for several decades its towns preserved their freedom and neutrality.

== As part of the Holy Roman Empire ==
Coat of arms of the county of Burgundy before c. 1280

The Arelat kingdom collapsed with the extinction the ruling line in 1032. The Kingdom of Burgundy was inherited by the Holy Roman Emperor Conrad II of the Salian dynasty, while the Duchy of Burgundy returned to a cadet branch of the French Capetian dynasty. As a result, the County of Burgundy became a fief of the Holy Roman Empire.

At the end of the 11th century Conrad's son Emperor Henry III elevated the Archbishop of Besançon to the dignity of an archchancellor and conferred upon Besançon the rank of a Reichsstadt (imperial city) under the Emperor's direct patronage. Guy of Burgundy, brother of Renaud II, later became pope and negotiated the Concordat of Worms with Emperor Henry V. In the 12th century, Imperial protection allowed for the development of Besançon, but in 1127, after the assassination of William III, his cousin Renaud III shook off the Imperial yoke and refused to pay homage to Lothair III (at the time still Lothair II of Germany). After 10 years of conflict, Renaud was victorious. Burgundy was from then on called Franche-Comté, the "free county".

Emperor Frederick Barbarossa re-established imperial influence. Frederick took the brother of Count William IV prisoner, then when William died Frederick married William's niece and heir, Beatrice I (daughter of Renaud III). Upon Emperor Frederick's death in 1190, his younger son Otto I received the county of Burgundy and assumed the rare (possibly unique) title of archcount. He was succeeded by his daughter, Beatrice II, and her husband Otto I, Duke of Merania; they were in turn followed by their son, Otto III, Count of Burgundy (r. 1231–1238), and their daughter, Adelaide (alias Alix of Méran, r. 1248–1279).

The Counts Palatine for many years had to share power with the greater feudal families of the county, notably with the family of Chalon, which was descended from Stephen III, count of Auxonne, grandson of William IV and Beatrice of Thiern, the heir of the county of Chalon. In 1237, count John "the Old" of Chalon, transferred his possessions under the French Crown (including Chalon and Auxerre) to the Duke of Burgundy in exchange for wealthy possessions in the County of Burgundy, including the salt mines of Salins-les-Bains (which became the autonomous Seigneurie of Salins). The authority of John the Old was re-established only by the marriage (around 1239) of his oldest son Hugh of Chalon with Adelaide, the sister of Otto III (died 1248) and heiress of Burgundy. However, this did not prevent a younger son, John I of Chalon-Arlay, from taking control of the vassal states.

Otto IV, son of Hugh and Adelaide, was the last of the feudal counts of Burgundy. He married first the daughter of the Count of Bar, but the marriage was childless. His second marriage was to the grandniece of King Louis IX of France, Countess Mahaut of Artois. This marriage brought the county under French influence. The daughters of Otto IV and Mahaut, Joan II and Blanche, married respectively Philip V and Charles IV of France, sons of King Philip IV. Jeanne became Queen of France after having been involved in the Tour de Nesle Affair. In that same affair, Blanche was found guilty of adultery and was imprisoned for the rest of her life.

== Burgundian unions ==
The Duchy of Burgundy and the County of Burgundy in the 14th century

After quarrelling with his barons, and after a new revolt against the French carried out by John of Chalon-Arlay, Otto IV ceded the county to his daughter as a dowry and designated the King of France as administrator of the dowry in 1295. By marrying their daughter and heir Joan, Duke Odo IV of Burgundy reunited the duchy and the county under his rule, followed by his grandson Duke Philip I. The personal union was again broken when Philip died without heirs in 1361: the Duchy of Burgundy was seized as a reverted fief by King John II of France, while the Imperial county was inherited by Philip's great aunt Margaret I, a granddaughter of Count Otto IV. In 1382, she bequeathed her estates to her son Count Louis II of Flanders. During the reign of Phillip the Bold, the County was organized into having a council and a parlement—centered in the capital Dole.

Louis II died in 1384 leaving no male heirs, so the County of Burgundy formed part of the immense dowry of his daughter Margaret, which in 1405 was inherited by her son, the Burgundian duke John the Fearless. The county and the duchy were again ruled in personal union by his descendants from the House of Valois-Burgundy until the death of Duke Charles the Bold at the 1477 Battle of Nancy.

== Succession crisis ==
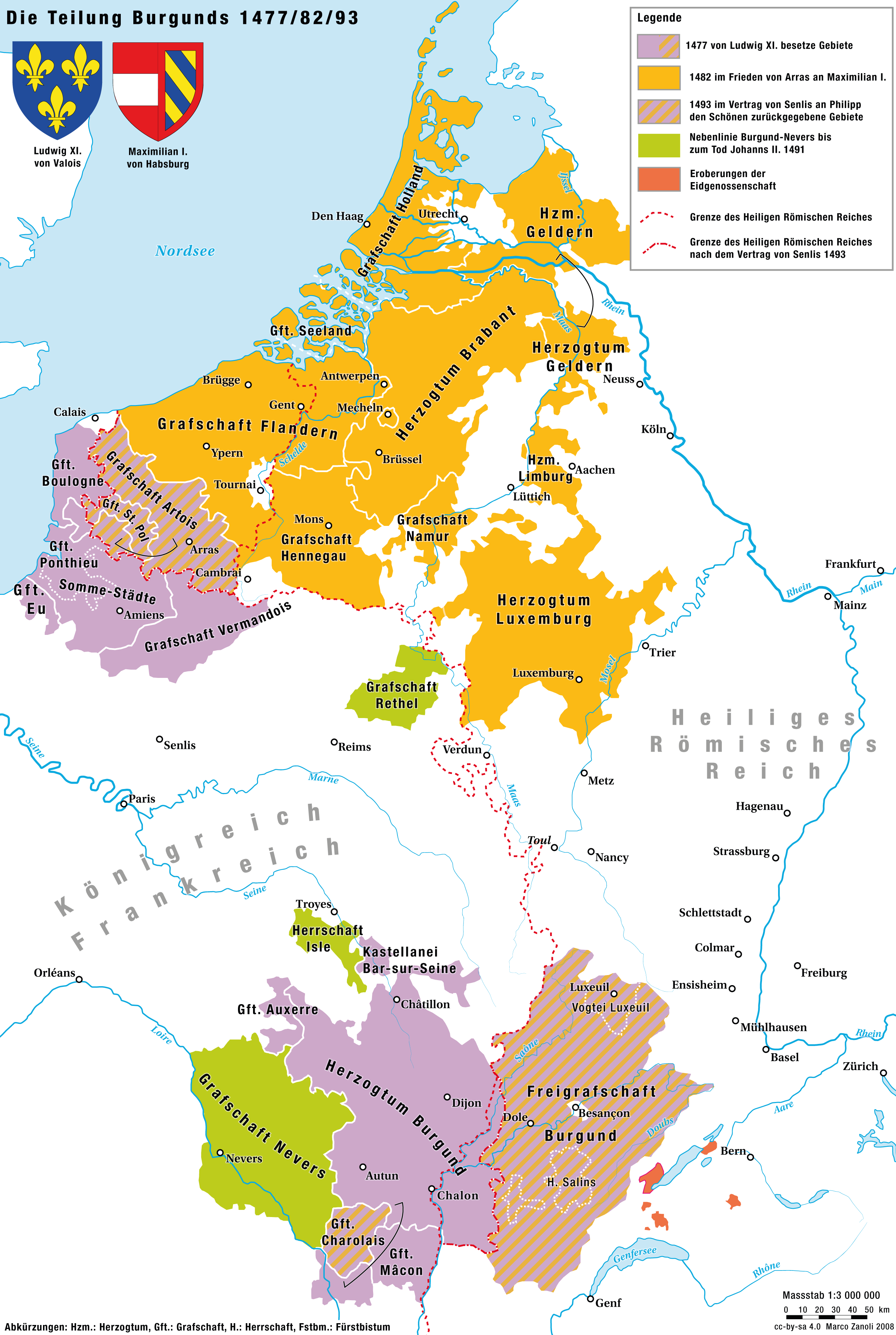
War of the Burgundian Succession (1477–1482–1493) Taken by France in 1477 Kept by Mary of Burgundy, and secured for her son Philip, by the Treaty of Arras (1482) Returned to Philip in 1493, by the Treaty of Senlis Domains of John II, Count of Nevers

Since Duke Charles the Bold died without the male heir, his daughter Mary of Burgundy, supported by her husband Archduke Maximilian of Austria, tried to secure inheritance over all of her fathers domains, including the County of Burgundy. That was opposed by the French King Louis XI of France, who immediately occupied the Duchy of Burgundy, and also took possession of the County. Though defeated at the 1479 Battle of Guinegate, the French retained the County by the Treaty of Arras in 1482. By that time, Mary of Burgundy died and her claims passed to her son Philip, who was styled as Philip IV in Burgundy, although at that time he was still a minor and thus under guardianship of his father Maximilian. Territorial disputes were settled by the Treaty of Senlis in 1493. The County was returned to Philip, while France kept the Duchy.

== Habsburg possession ==
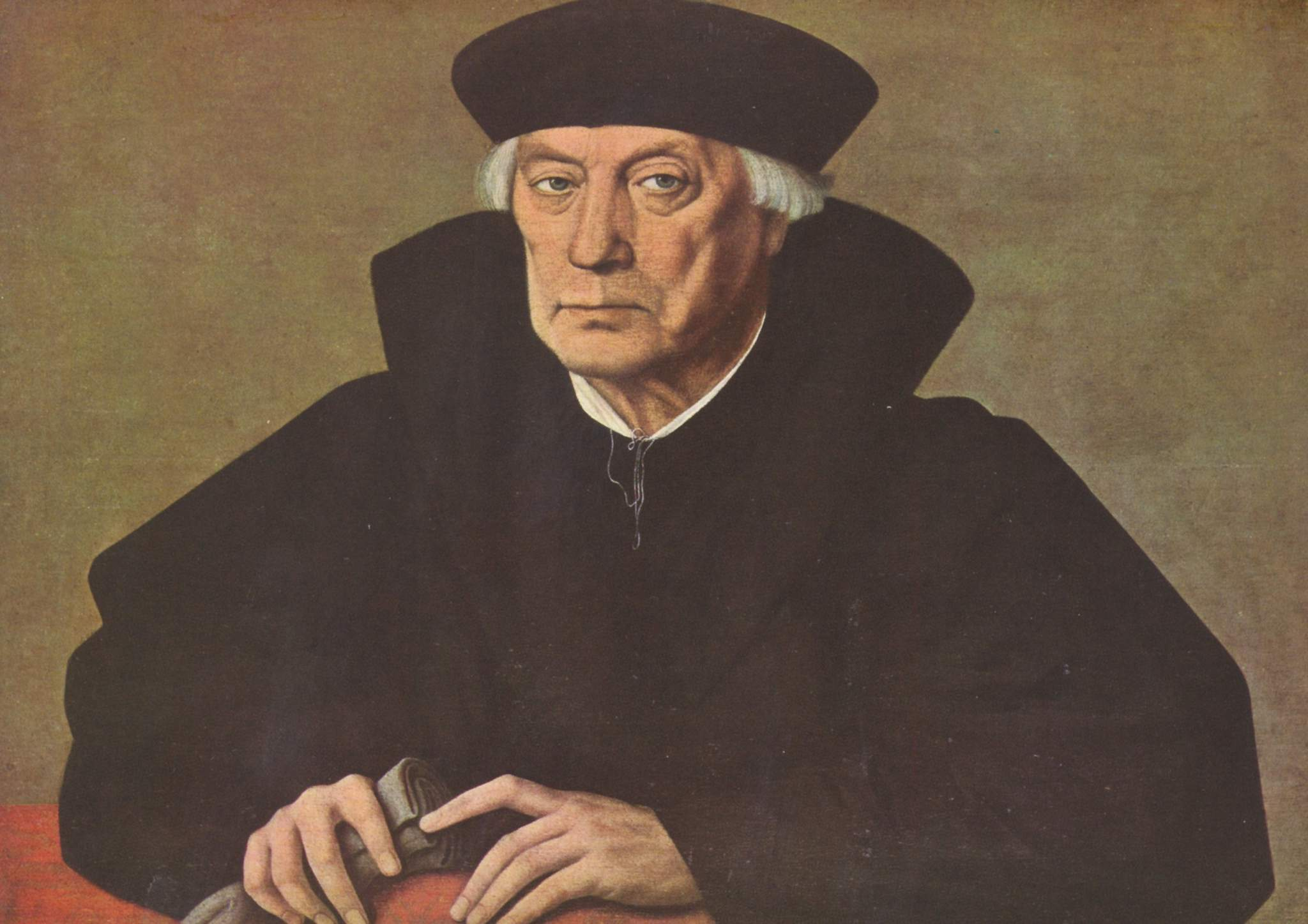
Mercurino di Gattinara (d. 1530), who served as President of the County Parliament of Burgundy from 1508 to 1518

Since the Treaty of Senlis (1493), the County of Burgundy was ruled by the Habsburgs. In 1512, it was included into the newly formed Burgundian Circle and administered as part of the Habsburg Netherlands. By that time, Philip died (1506) and was succeeded by his son Charles who was styled as Charles II in Burgundy. In 1508, Charles appointed an able administrator Mercurino di Gattinara as President of the County Parliament of Burgundy, and entrusted him with governance of the province. Gattinara remained at that post until 1518, when he succeeded Jean le Sauvage as the Grand Chancellor of Burgundy.

In 1516, Charles became the King of Spain and in 1519 he succeeded his grandfather Maximilian as the Holy Roman Emperor, thus becoming known as Charles V. In 1521, Charles decided to relinquish direct rule over old Austrian domains to his brother Ferdinand, but without Burgundian lands, that were kept by Charles as his own domain within the Empire. All of his Burgundian lands were later passed to his son Philip II of Spain, thus solidifying the political ties between Habsburg domains in Burgundy and the Habsburg Spain. Although ruled by Spanish Habsburgs, the County was never annexed into the Kingdom of Spain, and thus remained a domain within the Holy Roman Empire.

Since that time, the County gained geopolitical and military importance, since it was situated between Habsburg possessions in the Low Countries and Italy. The Spanish Road trade route ran through the County, connecting those Habsburg domains. During Habsburg rule, the County was prosperous and had autonomy. Dole's parliament was the political center, and a governor was chosen from the local nobility. Taxes were low, and there was not much conscription either. The city of Besancon had many fairs and many renaissance structures were constructed.

== Conquest by France ==
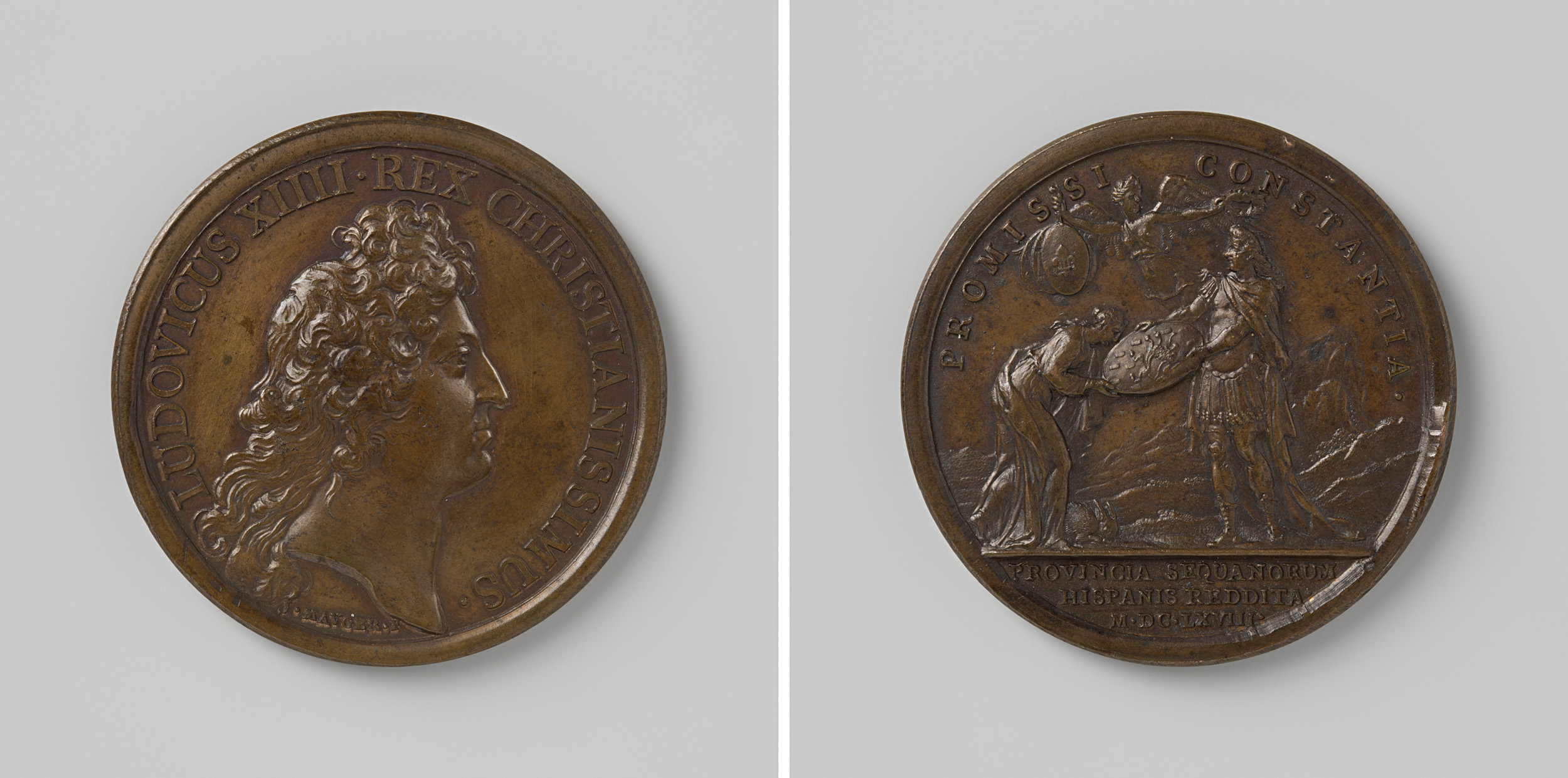
Medal of Louis XIV, commemorating the Treaty of Aix-la-Chapelle (1668), depicting the return of the County of Burgundy to the Spanish Habsburgs

The County was captured by France in 1668, during the War of Devolution. Multiple cities surrendered to the French after little fighting, but later in the same year the County was returned to the Spanish Habsburgs under the Treaty of Aix-la-Chapelle.

During the Franco-Dutch War, the County was invaded again in 1674, and overrun by French forces without much resistance. The Treaties of Nijmegen ended the war in 1678; as part of the third treaty (between France and Spain), the county was transferred to France in exchange for the return of French-occupied territory in the Spanish Netherlands.

The territory of the County, known as the Franche-Comté has remained part of France uninterrupted ever since; it now forms part of the administrative region Bourgogne-Franche-Comté.

== See also ==
- List of counts of Burgundy
- Kingdom of Burgundy
  - Kings of Burgundy
- Duchy of Burgundy
  - Duke of Burgundy
  - Dukes of Burgundy family tree
- Free Imperial City of Besançon

== Sources ==
- Bouchard, Constance B. (1987). Sword, Miter, and Cloister: Nobility and the Church in Burgundy, 980-1198. Ithaca and London: Cornell University Press. ISBN 0-8014-7526-0.
- Bouchard, Constance B. (1999). "Burgundy and Provence, 879–1032". The New Cambridge Medieval History. Vol. 3. Cambridge: Cambridge University Press. pp. 328–345. ISBN 978-0-521-36447-8.
- Dee, Darryl (2009). Expansion and Crisis in Louis XIV's France: Franche-Comté and Absolute Monarchy, 1674-1715. Rochester, NY: University of Rochester Press. ISBN 978-1-58046-303-4.
- Headley, John M. (1983). The Emperor and His Chancellor: A Study of the Imperial Chancellery Under Gattinara. New York: Cambridge University Press. ISBN 978-0-521-24444-2.
- Hauff, Andrea (2017). "The Kingdom of Upper Burgundy and the East Frankish Kingdom at the beginning of the 10th century". History Compass. 15 (8) e12396: 1–12. doi:10.1111/hic3.12396.
- Parker, Geoffrey (2019). Emperor: A New Life of Charles V. New Haven and London: Yale University Press. ISBN 978-0-300-19652-8.
- Potter, David L. (1995). A History of France, 1460–1560: The Emergence of a Nation. Basingstoke: Macmillan. ISBN 978-0-333-54123-4.
- Prevenier, Walter; Blockmans, Wim (1986). The Burgundian Netherlands. New York: Cambridge University Press. ISBN 978-90-6153-155-5.
- Riché, Pierre (1993). The Carolingians: A Family Who Forged Europe. Philadelphia: University of Pennsylvania Press. ISBN 0-8122-1342-4.
- Saenger, Paul (1977). "Burgundy and the Inalienability of Appanages in the Reign of Louis XI". French Historical Studies. 10 (1): 1–26. doi:10.2307/286114. JSTOR 286114.
- Stein, Robert (2017). Magnanimous Dukes and Rising States: The Unification of the Burgundian Netherlands, 1380–1480. Oxford: Oxford University Press. ISBN 978-0-19-875710-8.
