= Stephen II of Auxonne =

Count of Auxonne (1173–1237)

Stephen II
- Count of Auxonne
- Coats-of-arms of Auxonne
- Died: after 22 July 1173
- Noble family: House of Ivrea
- Spouse: Judith of Lorraine
- Issue: Stephen III of Auxonne
- Father: William III of Mâcon
- Mother: Poncette (or Adelheid/Alice) of Traves

Stephen (or Étienne) II (died after 22 July 1173) from the House of Ivrea was Count of Auxonne (1173–1237). He was Stephen II in his House and Stephen I as count of Auxonne.

He was the son of William III, count of Mâcon, Vienne and Auxonne and Adelaide-Pontia, heiress of Trier.

His brother was Geraud; the two brothers succeeded their father on 1156. Geraud inherited the counties of Mâcon and Vienne and Stephen II received the county of Auxonne from William III and the lordship of Traves from his mother.

He died after 22 July 1173 and he succeeded by his only child, Stephen III.

== Issue ==
He married c. 1170 to Judith, daughter of Matthias I, Duke of Lorraine and he had:

- Stephen III of Auxonne (d. 1241) married Beatrix, countess of Chalon

== Sources ==
- Bouchard, Constance Brittain (1987). Sword, Miter, and Cloister: Nobility and the Church in Burgundy, 980-1198. Cornell University Press.
