= William III of Burgundy =

French noble (died 1127)

William III, Count of Burgundy (died 1127) was a 12th-century French noble. He inherited his father William II's counties Burgundy and Mâcon as his only son, following William II's assassination by his barons in 1125.

He demonstrated his piety by founding a priory of the Order of Cluny on the island of Saint-Pierre, and married the daughter of Berthold II.

William III was himself then assassinated, as was his son William IV, at the church of Payerne on 1 March 1127.

He was succeeded by Renaud III, son of William III's great-uncle Stephen.
