= Alice of Normandy =

Countess consort of Burgundy (c.1002–1038)

Alice
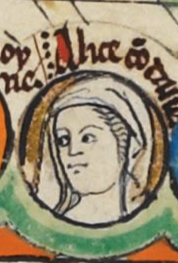

Countess consort of Burgundy
- Tenure: 1016–1026
- Born: c. 1002
- Died: 1038
- Spouse: Reginald I, Count of Burgundy
- Issue: William I, Count of Burgundy; Guy of Burgundy
- House: House of Normandy
- Father: Richard II, Duke of Normandy
- Mother: Judith of Brittany

Alice (Adeliza, Adelaide) (c. 1002 – 1038) was a daughter of Richard II, Duke of Normandy (c. 980–1026) and Judith of Brittany.

She married Reginald I, Count of Burgundy and had the following children:

- William I, Count of Burgundy (1020-12 Nov 1087)
- Guy (c. 1025–1069)
- Hugh (c. 1037 – c. 1086), Viscount of Lons-le-Saunier, sire Montmorot, Navilly and Scey married to Aldeberge Scey. They had a son Montmorot Thibert, founder of the house Montmorot (or Montmoret).
- Falcon or Fouques of Burgundy
