= John, Count of Chalon =

French nobleman (1190–1267)

John
- Count of Chalon
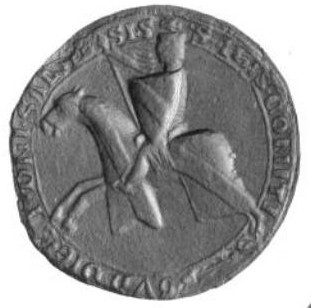
- John, Count of Chalon
- Born: 1190
- Died: 30 September 1267
- Noble family: House of Ivrea
- Spouses: Mahaud of Burgundy; Isabeau or Isabel of Courtenay; Laurette de Commercy
- Issue: Hugh III, Count of Burgundy; John I, Count of Auxerre; John I of Chalon-Arlay; Hugh of Chalon (archbishop of Besançon)
- Father: Stephen III of Auxonne
- Mother: Beatrice, Countess of Chalon

John (1190 – 30 September 1267), called the Old (l'Antique), was a French nobleman, the Count of Auxonne and Chalon-sur-Saône in his own right and regent in right of his son, Hugh III, Count of Burgundy. In contemporary documents, he was sometimes called "Count of Burgundy", as by King William of Germany in 1251.

He was the son of Stephen III of Auxonne and Beatrice, Countess of Châlon.

On June 5, 1237, he exchanged his inherited patrimony of Auxonne and Chalon with Hugh IV, Duke of Burgundy for the following territories: Salins (which was at the time the second city of the County of Burgundy), Belvoir, Vuillafans, Ornans, Montfaucon, Arlay, the castle of Clées in Vaud, Chaussin and Orgelet. He thus became one of the most powerful nobles in the county.

Although he gave charters to the towns in his territory, he also welcomed the Dominican friars as inquisitors.

The possession of Salins, with its salt production, gave John the fortune necessary to extend his territories. To protect the trade routes, he built the following fortresses: Le Pin, Montmahoux, Saint-Anne, Arguel and Nozeroy. He usually resided in Nozeroy.

To avoid the customs imposed by the Count of Pontarlier, he bought the forests in the region around Pontarlier and Jougne, which he logged, creating new roads. He founded the towns of Châtelblanc, Chaux-Neuve and Rochejean, the last of which contains his name.

== Family ==
He had three wives and 16 children.

He married Mahaud (or Mahaut) of Burgundy, the daughter of Hugh III, Duke of Burgundy and Beatrice of Albon. She died March 26, 1242. They had the following children:

- Elisabeth of Burgundy (1210–1277). In 1248, she married Henry I de Vergy.
- Blanche de Chalon (died 1306). In 1260, she married Guichard V de Beaujeu, and Béraud IX de Mercœur in 1268.
- Hugh III (1220–1267), who became Count of Burgundy by his marriage to Adelaide I of Burgundy.
- Margaret (died 1262) married Henry de Brienne.

He remarried to Isabeau (or Isabel) of Courtenay (1219-1256), the daughter of Robert I of Courtenay. They had the following children:

- John (1243–1309), seigneur de Rochefort. He became Count of Auxerre by his marriage to Alix de Bourgogne-Auxerre.
- Stephen (died 1302), Seigneur de Rouvres.
- Peter (died 1272) Seigneur de Châtel-Belin, in 1268, he married Beatrice, the daughter of Amadeus IV of Savoy

Upon Isabeau's death September 22, 1257, he remarried to Laurette de Commercy, the daughter of Simon II, Seigneur de Commercy, and Matilda, Countess of Saarbrücken. They had the following children:

- John I of Châlon (1259–1316), seigneur d'Arlay. Founder of the Châlon-Arlay branch of the house of Ivrea. In 1272, he married Margaret, daughter of Hugh IV, Duke of Burgundy.
- Hugh (died 1312), prince-bishop of Liège (1295–1301), and Archbishop of Besançon .
- Margaret (died 1328), who married Hugh of Burgundy.
- Agnes (died 1350). In 1285, she married Amedeus II, Count of Geneva

== Sources ==
- Kinkade, Richard P. (2004). "Beatrice "Contesson" of Savoy (c. 1250-1290): The Mother of Juan Manuel". La corónica: A Journal of Medieval Hispanic Languages, Literatures, and Cultures. 2 (3, Summer): 163–225.
- Kinkade, Richard P. (2020). Dawn of a Dynasty: The Life and Times of Infante Manuel of Castile. University of Toronto Press.
