= Beatrice of Lorraine, Countess of Burgundy =

French noble and Countess consort of Burgundy (12th century)

Beatrice of Lorraine (French: Béatrice; died 1116/1117) was a French noble and a Countess consort of Burgundy. Her grandchild-namesake was Beatrice I, Countess of Burgundy.

Béatrice was a daughter of Gerard, Duke of Lorraine and Hedwige of Namur. Spouse of Béatrice was Stephen I, Count of Burgundy. The couple had at least four children:

- Isabelle/Elisabeth
- Reginald III, Count of Burgundy
- William III of Mâcon
- Clemence/Margaret
