= Otto III of Burgundy =

Duke of Merania

Otto III
- Count of Burgundy
- Born: c. 1218
- Died: 19 June 1248; Niesten Castle, Franconia
- Buried: Langheim Abbey
- Noble family: House of Andechs
- Spouse: Elizabeth of Tyrol
- Father: Otto I, Duke of Merania
- Mother: Beatrice II, Countess of Burgundy

Otto III (c. 1218 – 19 June 1248), a member of the House of Andechs, was Count of Burgundy from 1231 and the last duke of Merania (numbered Otto II) from 1234 until his death.

== Family ==
Otto was the only son of Duke Otto I of Merania and Countess Beatrice II of Burgundy. He succeeded his mother as the count of Burgundy on her death in 1231, and his father as the duke of Andechs and Merania on his death in 1234. In the same year, he married Elizabeth, daughter of Count Albert IV of Tyrol. The marriage remained childless.

== Rule ==
Still a minor, Otto remained under the tutelage of his Andechs relative Bishop Ekbert of Bamberg until 1236. When he came of age, he left the administration of the County of Burgundy (Franche-Comté) to King Theobald I of Navarre to engage in the struggle around his Bavarian possessions against the ducal House of Wittelsbach. He lost his position as a vogt of Tegernsee Abbey as well as the ancestral seat in Andechs, but retained the possession of Innsbruck, which he elevated to a town in 1239 and put under the administration of his father-in-law Count Albert IV of Tyrol. In 1242 he gave Franche-Comté in pawn to Duke Hugh IV of Burgundy.

In his later years, Otto concentrated on his family's estates in Franconia. In the fierce controversy between Emperor Frederick II and Pope Innocent IV, he sided with his feudal lord, the bishop of Bamberg, which earned him an Imperial ban and a large-scale loss of his possessions. Like his Andechs ancestors, he benefitted the Cistercian abbey in Langheim, Franconia, where he was buried upon his death in 1248. He also had vested neighbouring Lichtenfels with city rights in 1231. Childless, he was succeeded in Burgundy by his sister Adelaide and her husband Count Hugh of Chalon, while the Duchy of Merania expired. With the death of Otto's uncle Patriarch Berthold of Aquileia in 1251, the House of Andechs became extinct.

Otto III of Burgundy House of Andechs Born: c. 1218 Died: 19 June 1248
Preceded by Beatrice II; Otto II	Count of Burgundy; 1231–1248	Succeeded by Adelaide; Hugh
Preceded by Otto I	Duke of Merania; 1234–1248	Duchy dissolved
