= Otto I of Burgundy =

Count of Burgundy and Luxembourg

Otto I
- Count of Burgundy
- Born: Between 1167 and 1171
- Died: 13 January 1200
- Buried: St Stephen's Cathedral (Citadel of Besançon)
- Noble family: Hohenstaufen Dynasty
- Spouse: Margaret of Blois
- Issue: Joanna I, Countess of Burgundy; Beatrice II, Countess of Burgundy
- Father: Frederick I, Holy Roman Emperor
- Mother: Beatrice I, Countess of Burgundy

Otto I (in French, Otton I, between 1167 and 1171 – 13 January 1200) was Count of Burgundy from 1190 to his death and briefly Count of Luxembourg from 1196 to 1197. He was the fourth son of Frederick I, Holy Roman Emperor, and his second wife Beatrice I, Countess of Burgundy, daughter of Count Renaud III.

== Rule ==
Upon the death of his mother, Countess Beatrice I of Burgundy, in 1184, Otto was granted the Burgundian county by his father, Emperor Frederick Barbarossa, elevating him to the rank of a count palatine. Haughty Otto however soon entered into several feuds: not only with the Anscarid lords of Auxonne and Mâcon, who claimed Beatrice's heritage, but also with the counts of Montbéliard, Duke Odo III of Burgundy and Duke Berthold V of Zähringen. In the course of negotiations in 1195, he killed Count Amadeus II of Montfaucon with his own hands, followed by the assassination of Alsatian Count Ulric of Ferrette in 1197 and the execution of a brother of Konrad von Hüneburg, bishop of Strasbourg, in 1198.

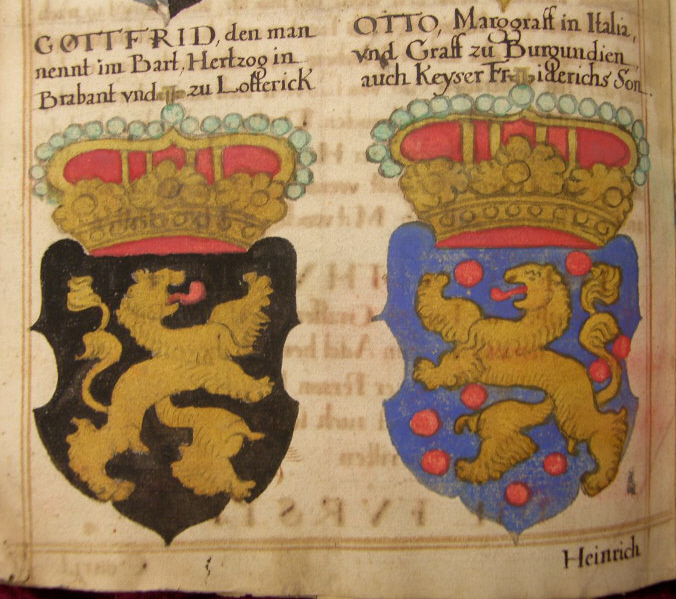
Otto's coat of arms (right), Georg Rüxner c. 1530, 17th century reprint

When Count Henry IV of Luxembourg died without male heirs in 1196, his county escheated to his overlord, Otto's brother Emperor Henry VI. Henry then granted it to Otto. Count Theobald I of Bar, son-in-law of Count Henry IV, negotiated the renunciation of Luxembourg with Otto the next year.

Meanwhile, Count Palatine Otto's regional conflicts had become a severe threat to the power politics of his Hohenstaufen relatives. Considered to be inefficient and busy solving problems in his own fief, upon the death of Henry VI in 1197, it was his younger brother Philip, whom he faithfully supported, chosen to be the successor rather than him. After Philip had been elected King of the Romans in 1198, rivaling with the Welf Duke Otto of Brunswick, he tried to settle the numerous quarrels picked by his brother. In 1200 Otto was assassinated at Besançon. His death came in useful to many political actors. Otto was buried at St Stephen's Cathedral, today the site of the Citadel of Besançon.

== Family ==
Otto had married Margaret, daughter of Count Theobald V of Blois, in 1190. After her husband's death her brother-in-law King Philip enfeoffed her with the Burgundian county, as regent for her minor daughter Joanna I. Upon Joanna's death in 1205, Otto's second daughter, Beatrice II, became countess and Philip had her marry Duke Otto I of Merania.

Otto was said to have an illegitimate son, Hugo, who in 1203 surrendered any claim to the county to his stepmother, Margaret. The charter recording this is known only from a 16th-century work by Guillaume Paradin.

== Sources ==
- Allemand-Gay, Marie-Thérèse (1988). Le pouvoir des comtes de Bourgogne au XIIIe siècle (in French). Vol. 368. Annales Litteraires de l'Universite de Besancon.
- Bouchard, Constance Brittain (1987). Sword, Miter, and Cloister: Nobility and the Church in Burgundy, 980-1198. Cornell University Press.
- Bumke, Joachim (1991). Courtly Culture: Literature and Society in the High Middle Ages. Translated by Dunlap, Thomas. University of California Press. ISBN 9780520066342.
- Gislebertus of Mons (2005). Chronicle of Hainaut. Translated by Napran, Laura. Boydell Press.
- Mariotte, Jean-Yves (1986). "Othon »Sans Terre«, comte palatin de Bourgogne et la fin des Staufen en Franche-Comté". Francia. 14: 83–102. doi:10.11588/fr.1986.0.52590.
- Sturner, Wolfgang (1992). Friedrich II:Teil 1 Die Konigscheffschaft in Sizilien un Deutschland 1194-1220 (in German). Wissenschaftliche Buchgesellschaft.

Otto I of Burgundy House of Hohenstaufen Born: c.1167-1171 Died: 13 January 1200
Regnal titles
Preceded by Frederick	Count of Burgundy; 1190–1200	Succeeded by Joan I
Preceded by Henry IV	Count of Luxemburg; 1196–1197	Succeeded by Ermesinde and Theobald
