= Montigny-lès-Cherlieu =

- Commune
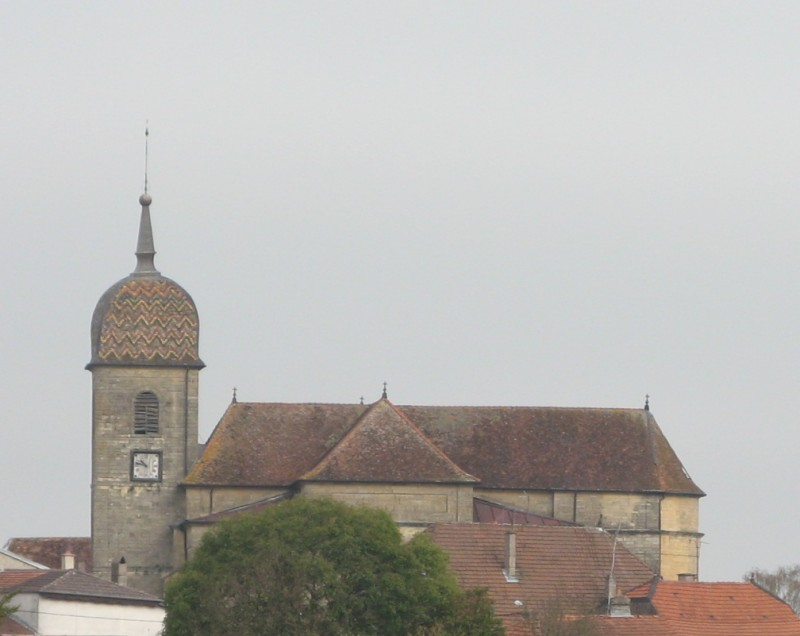
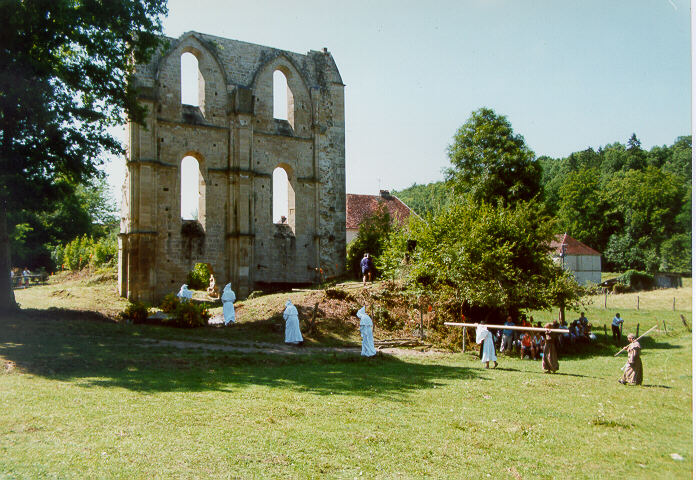
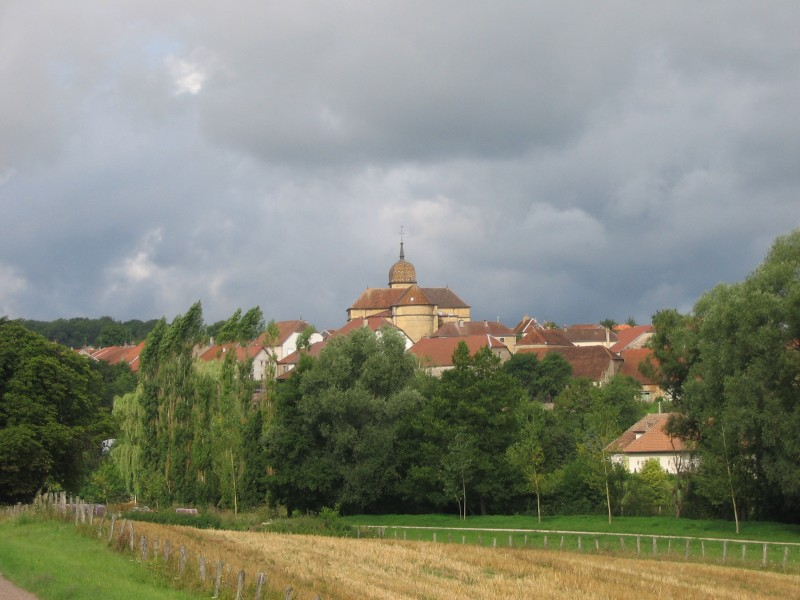
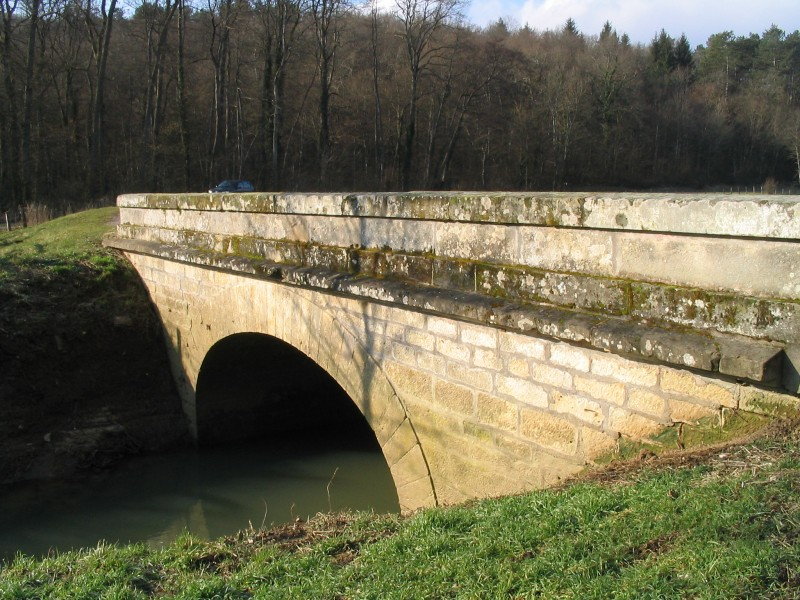

- Coat of arms
- Location of Montigny-lès-Cherlieu
- Location within France Location within Bourgogne-Franche-Comté
- Coordinates: 47°47′59″N 5°48′44″E
- Country: France
- Region: Bourgogne-Franche-Comté
- Department: Haute-Saône
- Arrondissement: Vesoul
- Canton: Jussey

Government
  - Mayor (2021–2026): André Aubry
- Area^{1}: 20.98 km^{2} (8.10 sq mi)
- Highest elevation: 369 m (1,211 ft)
- Lowest elevation: 227 m (745 ft)
- Population (2023): 118
  - Density: 5.62/km^{2} (14.6/sq mi)
- Time zone: UTC+01:00 (CET)
  - Summer (DST): UTC+02:00 (CEST)
- INSEE/Postal code: 70362 /70500
- ^{1} French Land Register data, which excludes lakes, ponds, glaciers > 1 km^{2} (0.386 sq mi or 247 acres) and river estuaries.

Montigny-lès-Cherlieu (French pronunciation: [mɔ̃tiɲi lɛ ʃɛʁljø]) is a commune in the Haute-Saône department in the region of Bourgogne-Franche-Comté in eastern France.

The Cistercian Cherlieu Abbey was sited here.

== See also ==
- Communes of the Haute-Saône department
