= John I of Auxerre =

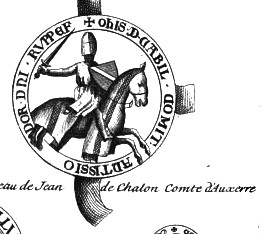
Seal of John I of Chalon-Auxerre

John I of Chalon-Auxerre (1243–1309) was a son of John, Count of Chalon and his second wife, Isabella van Courtenay - his brother was bishop Hugo III of Chalon. John I married Adelaide of Auxerre and they ruled jointly as Count of Auxerre. John was the father of William of Chalon.
