= Guy of Burgundy =

Norman noble

Guy of Burgundy, also known as Guy of Brionne, was born into the Anscrids, specifically the House of Ivrea with a distant claim via the female line to the Duchy of Normandy, though his cousin William the Conqueror was the preferred choice. He ruled over extensive lands and castles gifted to him by his cousin, which would later be reclaimed following a failed rebellion led by Guy. Though not much can be historically said of Guy of Burgundy/Guy of Brionne with there being no direct secondary sources on his life and primary sources scarce, the story of his life can be explained by the circumstances surrounding him, especially his familial lineage in relation to William the Conqueror. His life shows the importance of the duchy and its system in the 11th century.

== Early life ==
Guy was born to Reginald I, Count of Burgundy, and Alice of Normandy, also referred to as Adeliza by William himself via the writing of Orderic Vitalis. As a younger son, he did not stand to inherit anything. As his mother was the daughter of Richard II, Duke of Normandy, Guy was sent to be raised at the Norman court in the early 1040s. It was hoped that the guardians of his young cousin, William the Bastard, would provide a future for Guy that would produce a fruitful outcome, with a possible title later in life. Guy was William's household companion for a time. and as such did not have the resources needed to challenge ducal authority. As documented by Orderic Vitalis' Historia Ecclesiastica, William welcomed Guy from a different province, treating him with the likeness of a brother. William also remarks in the work of how he gifted Guy the lordship of Brionne in benefice, as well as a large portion of Normandy to control. He was granted Vernon as well. Like his predecessor and cousin, Gilbert, Guy was a notable benefactor of the Abbey of Bec.

== Rebellion ==
In the late autumn of 1046 leading into 1047, the disorder in Normandy which had ravaged the duchy for several years began to crystallize into a coordinated assault upon the young William. William of Jumieges wrote that William stated he feared the idea of being thrown down from the summit of his ducal power and replaced by a rival, and William of Poitiers wrote that Guy wished to receive the principatus of Normandy. As one of the possible successors to the duchy in 1035, Guy became the prime mover in this revolt, and was able to rally the support of a very powerful group of Norman magnates. The plan for this revolt was based in the form of conspiracy, making his group of men those with grievances against William. Though the entirety of the claim for the throne came from William’s illegitimacy, in traditional Norman custom, duke Robert the Magnificent, his father, declared William to be the heir for his position and made royals swear loyalty to the young William. According to William of Poitiers, Guy either aimed at the ducal throne, which would have been unusually ambitious considering the late Duke Robert’s declaration of William as heir, or wanted to secure the greater part of the duchy for himself. Whether Guy merely felt sidelined at William's court or thought himself a better heir than his illegitimate cousin is ultimately unclear. He then began to slander the name of his cousin William, declaring him a bastard and unfit for the throne.

Guy was defeated by William and his overlord, King Henry I of France, at the Battle of Val-ès-Dunes. He retreated to his castle at Brionne, where the Duke besieged him there for three years before finally subduing him in 1049. William of Poitiers wrote that the Duke subsequently allowed Guy to remain at his court; while contrarily William of Jumièges describes this as house arrest. As a punishment for his rebellion, Guy lost his castles and land that was once given to him under benefice. As written by Orderic Vitalis in his Historia Ecclesiastica in another similar history, during this time, the castle in which Guy resided was the Castle of Brionne, where he lived until the aftermath of the rebellion when William took it back under his control. After his defeat and several losses of his land and power, Guy’s historiography seems to end. What happens in his later life is unknown, with the last documentation of his presence being when he was under house arrest.
