= Stephen of Burgundy =

French nobleman (1065–1102)

Stephen
- Born: 1065
- Died: 17 May 1102 (aged 36–37); Ramla
- Noble family: Ivrea
- Spouse: Beatrice of Lorraine, Countess of Burgundy
- Issue: Reginald III of Burgundy; William III of Mâcon
- Father: William I of Burgundy
- Mother: Stephanie

Stephen (1065 – 17 May 1102), known as the Rash, was Count of Burgundy, Mâcon and Vienne from 1097 until his death.

Born into a powerful and influential family, Stephen was the son of William I, Count of Burgundy and his wife Stephanie. Stephen’s younger brother Guy of Burgundy later became Pope Callixtus II.

Stephen succeeded to the county in 1097, following the death in the First Crusade of his elder brother Reginald II. Stephen participated in the Crusade of 1101, as a commander in the army of Stephen of Blois, helping with the capture of Ancyra and fighting in the disastrous Battle of Mersivan. Stephen later died at the Battle of Ramla in 1102. He was succeeded by his eldest son, Reginald III.

== Family ==
Stephen was married to Beatrice of Lorraine. Beatrice and Stephen’s children were:

- Isabella, who married Hugh, Count of Champagne, who later renounced her and their son Eudes
- Reginald III, Count of Burgundy
- William III of Mâcon
- Clemence/Margaret, d. 1163, who married Guigues IV of Albon, Dauphin de Viennois. They were the parents of Guigues V of Albon.

Stephen of Burgundy House of Ivrea Born: 1065 Died: 1102
Regnal titles
Preceded by Reginald II	Count Palatine of Burgundy; 1097–1102	Succeeded by Reginald III
