= Otto IV of Burgundy =

Otto IV
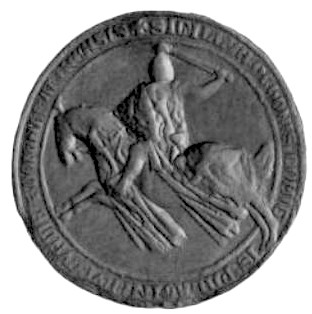
- Seal of Otto IV

Count of Burgundy
- Reign: 8 March 1279 – 17 March 1303
- Predecessor: Adelaide
- Successor: Joan II
- Born: c. 1248; Ornans
- Died: 17 March 1303; Melun
- Spouse: Philippa of Bar; Mahaut of Artois
- Issue: Joan II, Countess of Burgundy; Blanche, Queen of France; Robert of Burgundy
- House: House of Ivrea
- Father: Hugh de Châlon
- Mother: Adelaide, Countess Palatine of Burgundy

Otto IV (c. 1248, in Ornans – 17 March 1303, in Melun) was the count of the Free County of Burgundy from 1279 until 1303.

== Life ==
Otto was the son of Hugh of Châlons and Adelaide, Countess Palatine of Burgundy. Upon his father's death in 1266/7, he became Count of Châlons. In 1267, the pro-French Otto IV got in conflict with his half-uncle John I of Chalon-Arlay, who was supported by his vassals. His mother, Adelaide, died on 8 March 1279, and Otto inherited her county. However, he was unable to secure real power in the county until 1295. His elder daughter Joan II succeeded in the County of Burgundy, which was later given as dowry on her marriage to Philip.

His wife Mahaut drew up a contract on 4 June 1312 with the famous tomb maker Jean Pépin de Huy to make a tomb. The contract specifies a tomb made of stone and alabaster. Otto was to be shown as an armed knight with a shield, sword and armor. A lion was shown beneath his feet with two angels to support the pillow under his head. The tomb no longer exists, but the designs have been preserved.

== Marriage and children ==
Otto married Philippa of Bar in 1271. The marriage was childless.

In 1285, Otto married his second wife, Mahaut, Countess of Artois. They had:

- Joan II, Countess of Burgundy (c.1291 - 1330) married Philip, Count of Poitiers (later King of France) in 1307
- Blanche (c.1296 - 1326) married Charles, Count of La Marche (also later King of France).
- Robert (c.1300 – 1317).

== Sources ==
- Brown, Elizabeth A.R. (2009). "Blanche of Artois and Burgundy, Chateau-Gaillard, and the Baron de Joursanvault". In Smith, Katherine Allen; Wells, Scott (eds.). Negotiating community and difference in medieval Europe: gender, power, patronage, and the authority of religion in Latin Christendom. BRILL.
- Cox, Eugene L. (1974). The Eagles of Savoy. Princeton: Princeton University Press. ISBN 0691052166.
- Cox, Eugene (1999). "The kingdom of Burgundy, the lands of the house of Savoy and adjacent territories". In Abulafia, David (ed.). The New Cambridge Medieval History: Volume 5, C.1198-c.1300. Cambridge University Press.
- Frisch, Teresa G. (1987). Gothic Art 1140-c. 1450:Sources and Documents. University of Toronto Press.
- Funck-Brentano, Frantz (1888). "Philippe le Bel et la Noblesse Franc-Comtoise". Bibliothèque de l'École des chartes. 49. Librairie Droz: 5–40.
- Gauthier, M. Jules (1903). "Services Funebres du Comte Othon IV de Bourgogne celebres en Franche-Comte en 1303". Bulletin Historique et Philologique. Imprimerie Nationale.
- Jackson-Laufer, Guida Myrl (1999). Women Rulers Throughout the Ages: An Illustrated Guide. ABC-CLIO.

Otto IV of Burgundy House of Ivrea Born: c. 1248 Died: 17 March 1303
Regnal titles
Preceded by Adelaide	Count of Burgundy; 1279–1303	Succeeded by Joan II
