= Erard II of Chacenay =

Erard II (died 16 June 1236) was the Sire de Chacenay (Chassenay) from 1190/1. (Note: His name and title appear in charters as: dominus Erardus de Cachenaio; Airardus dominus de Chassenay; Erardus dominus Chacenaii) He was the eldest son of Erard I of Chacenay and Mathilde de Donzy.

== Life ==
In 1209 Erard, with the consent of his unnamed wife, confirmed a donation to Basse-Fontaine by a certain Agnete, specified as domina of Chacenay, probably his grandmother Agnes de Brienne.

During the succession crisis of Champagne, Erard was the strongest support of Erard of Brienne-Ramerupt and was the last to reconcile with Blanche of Navarre.

Uneasy with the result in Champagne, Erard took part in the Fifth Crusade (1217), but was back in Europe by 1220. In July 1219 Erard's cousin, Hervé, Count of Nevers, confirmed a donation Erard had made to the Teutonic Knights, while Erard was at the siege of Damietta. Upon his return, Erard paid homage to Theobald, Count of Champagne and made a donation to the convent of Argensolles, which had been founded by Blanche of Navarre.

He was a patron of the trouvère Guiot de Dijon. He was buried in the Abbey of Clairvaux, 16 June 1236.

== Marriage and children ==
Erard was the second husband of Emmeline (Emelina) de Broyes (died 1249, before April), widow of Odo II of Champlitte. They were married in 1205. In 1218 she made a joint donation with her husband to the Abbey of Moutier-la-Celle. Erard was faced with a possible divorce when he sold his step-daughter, Oda's, inheritance to the Knights Templar. Erard and Emeline had:

- Huet, died on Crusade in 1247, no children
- Erard III, succeeded Erard
- Matilda, who married Guy d'Arcis-sur-Aube
- Alix of Chacenay
- Joanna, who is only known from the donation of 1218

== Sources ==
- Evergates, Theodore (2007). The Aristocracy in the County of Champagne, 1100-1300. University of Pennsylvania Press.
- Schenk, Jochen (2012). Templar Families, Landowning Families and the Order of the Temple in France, c.1120-1307. Cambridge University Press.
