= Odo II of Champlitte =

Odo II of Champlitte (died May 1204 at the Siege of Constantinople) was the first son of Odo I of Champlitte and a grandson of Hugh, Count of Champagne, although Hugh disowned Odo I.

At an assembly at Citeaux, Odo, and his brother William, joined the crusade. Upon the crusade's arrival at Corfu, a disagreement as to where the crusade should be directed divided the army into two camps. One that wanted follow Hugh of Saint-Pol and Prince Alexius to Constantinople, the other headed by Odo, Jacques of Avenes and Peter of Amiens, to continue on to Jerusalem. After Odo arrived at Corfu he sent messengers to Brindisi to hire a fleet to take the crusade to Jerusalem. Subsequent meetings between Odo, Hugh and Alexious, directed the crusade towards Constantinople.

Odo participated in the siege of Constantinople, fell ill, and died shortly after in May 1204. He was buried in the Hagia Sophia.

He left behind a wife, Emeline of Broyes, who was much younger than he, and a daughter, Oda or Odette or Euda, who married Hugh I of Ghent. Emiline was daughter of Elizabeth of Druex and Hugh III of Broyes.
