= Hugh of Chalon (archbishop of Besançon) =

Hugo III of Chalon (c. 1260 – c. 1312) was a cleric from Free County of Burgundy.

Hugues was a son of Jean "the old" of Chalon (1190–1267), Sire of Salins and his third wife Laura of Commercy (d. 1275), sister of Simon IV, Count of Saarbrücken. His nephew Jean of Chalon (1300 – c.1334), son of Jean I, Seigneur of Chalon-Arlay, the Bishop of Basel, and Bishop of Langres and Peer of France.

He studied theology in Paris and was an archdeacon in Laon. From 1295 to 1301 he was prince-bishop of Liège, appointed by Pope Boniface VIII. Jean played a role in the conflict between Awans and Waroux (fr) (1297–1335), and supported with the siege of Awans until their surrender. Hugues could not prevent military action from both sides and the war continued for decades. There were other conflicts around Liège too, with the Count of Namur and rebels on one side, and the Duke of Brabant and the Count of Loon on the other side with the bishop.

In 1300 he defended himself before the Roman curia in Rome against charges from the cathedral chapter and others, that he had defrauded his brother John I of Chalon-Auxerre and that he had sold off ecclesiastical possessions for benefits and allegiances. Pope Boniface VIII removed him from his bishopric at Liège and instead made him Archbishop of Besançon.

Hugues participated in the Council of Vienne (1311–1312) convoked by Pope Clement V, where he contracted an illness and died, probably around 22 February 1312.

== Ancestry ==
Ancestors of Hugh of Chalon (archbishop of Besançon)

Étienne, "Stephen" I of Auxonne (fr) (c.1130–1173); Count of Auxonne
Étienne, "Stephen" II of Auxonne (fr) (c.1172–1241); Count jure uxoris of Chalon
Judith of Lorraine (c.1145 – 1173)
Jean "the old" of Chalon-Arlay (1190–1267); Count of Chalon, Sire of Salins, regent of Burgundy
Guillaume II/III, Count of Chalon/Thiers (fr) (c.1120–1203)
Beatrice of Thiers (1174–1227), Countess of Chalon
(Beatrix of Swabia ?)
Hugues III de Chalon; Prince-Bishop of Liège, Archbishop of Besançon
Gaucher of Commercy (fr) (c.1185 – 1244/48); Seigneur of Andelot and Commercy
Simon II/III, Seigneur of Commercy (d.c. 1247)
Agnès of Fouvent (c. 1195 – a. 1248)
Laure of Commercy (d.1275)
Simon III, Count of Saarbrücken (c. 1180–1243)
Matilde (d.1276), Countess of Saarbrücken
Laurette of Lothringen (Upper Lorraine) (1195 – c.1226 ?)

If Barbarossa would have been grandfather of Beatrice of Thiers, it would have been attested in reliable documents, and such are lacking. Barbarossa seemed to have a daughter Beatrix (c.1161–1174), poorly documented, and not married as known.

== See also ==
Hugues III of Chalon House of Chalon-Arlay Born: c.1260 Died: 1312
Catholic Church titles
Regnal titles
Preceded by John of Flanders (fr)	Prince-Bishop of Liège; 1295–1301	Succeeded by Adolf II of Waldeck
Preceded by Odo de Rougemont	Archbishop of Besançon as Hugues V 1301–1312	Succeeded by Vital de Maignaut
