= Alice of Mâcon =

French noblewoman

Alix of Mâcon (died 1260), was a Countess regnant suo jure of Mâcon in 1224–1239.
