= John of Dreux =

John of Dreux may refer to:

- Jehan de Braine (died 1240), trouvère
- John I of Dreux (died 1249)
- John II of Dreux (died 1309)
