= Reginald II of Burgundy =

Burgundian nobleman

Reginald II (1061 – 1097) was the count of Burgundy, Mâcon, Vienne and Oltingen. He was born in 1061 as the eldest son of William I, Count of Burgundy and brother to Stephen I, Count of Burgundy, his successor, as well as to Pope Callixtus II.

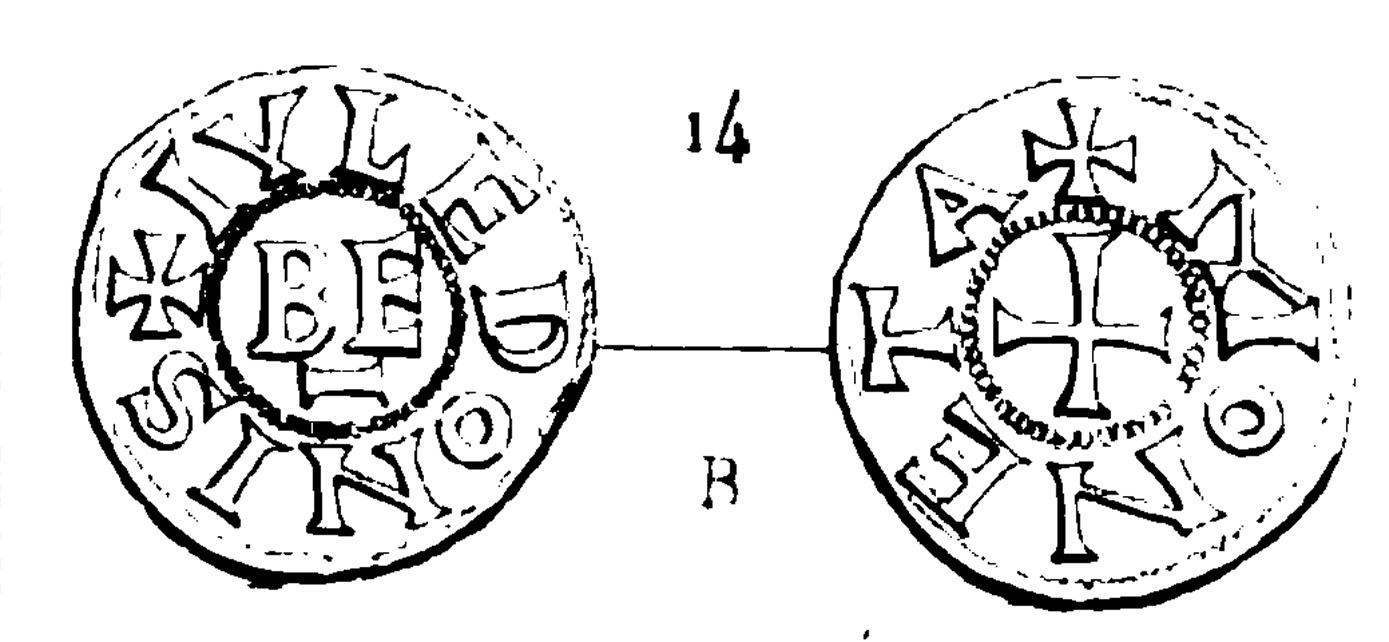
Coin of Reginald II

He succeeded to the county, aged 25, on his father's death in 1087, also gaining the County of Mâcon.

By his marriage to Regina of Oltingen, Reginald obtained the County of Oltingen. They were the parents of William II, Count of Burgundy. His brother-in-law was Hézelon de Liège, canon and architect of the church of Cluny Abbey (Cluny III).

The place and date of Reginald's death is uncertain, as is Reginald's potential participation in the First Crusade. Reginald's death is dated either to 1095, prior to the First Crusade or to circa 1102 in the Holy Land along with Reginald’s brothers Stephen I and Hugh, archbishop of Besançon.

Regnal titles
Preceded by William I	Count of Burgundy; 1087–1097	Succeeded by Stephen I
