= Reginald I of Burgundy =

Count of Burgundy (986–1057)

Reginald I
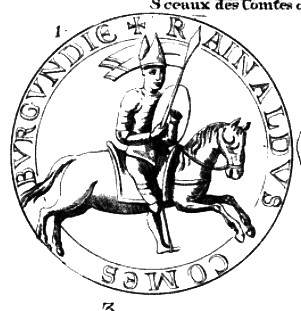
- Reginald's depiction
- Born: 986
- Died: 1057 (aged 70-71)
- Noble family: House of Ivrea
- Spouse: Alice of Normandy
- Issue: William I, Count of Burgundy; Guy of Burgundy
- Father: Otto-William, Count of Burgundy
- Mother: Ermentrude of Roucy

Reginald I was the second count of the Free County of Burgundy. Born in 986, Reginald was the son of Otto-William, the first count, and Ermentrude of Roucy. He was thus born as an heir to many key lands of the Kingdom of Arles and would remain a noble there following it becoming a part of the Holy Roman Empire in 1033.

In 1016, Reginald married Alice of Normandy. Reginald succeeded to the county on his father's death in 1026. Reginald was succeeded by his son, William I, on his death in 1057.

Reginald and his wife Alice of Normandy and had the following children:

- William I, Count of Burgundy
- Guy (c. 1025–1069), unsuccessful claimant to the Duchy of Normandy and County of Burgundy
- Hugh (c. 1037 – c. 1086), Viscount of Lons-le-Saunier, sire Montmorot, Navilly and Scey married to Aldeberge Scey. They had a son Montmorot Thibert, founder of the house Montmorot (or Montmoret).
- Falcon or Fouques of Burgundy (fate unknown).

== Sources ==
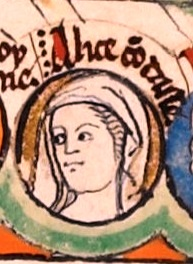
Reginald's consort, Alice

- Bouchard, Constance (2000). "Burgundy and Provence, 879-1032". In Reuter, Timothy (ed.). The New Cambridge Medieval History. Vol. III: c.900-c.1024. Cambridge University Press.
- Douglas, David C. (1964). William the Conqueror: The Norman Impact Upon England. University of California Press.
- Fegley, Randall (2002). The Golden Spurs of Kortrijk: How the Knights of France Fell to the Foot Soldiers of Flanders in 1302. McFarland & Co. Inc.
- Poole, Austin Lane (1951). From Domesday Book to Magna Carta, 1087-1216. Clarendon Press.
- Potter, Julie (1999). "The Benefactors of Bec and the Politics of Priories". In Harper-Bill, Christopher (ed.). Anglo-Norman Studies XXI: Proceedings of the Battle Conference 1998. Boydell Press.

Reginald I of Burgundy House of Ivrea Born: 986 Died: 1057
Regnal titles
Preceded by Otto-William	Count of Burgundy; 1026–1057	Succeeded by William I
