= Count of Vienne =

Countship

The count of Vienne was the ruler of the Viennois, with his seat at Vienne, during the period of the Carolingian Empire and after until 1030, when the county of Vienne was granted to the Archdiocese of Vienne.

Girart de Roussillon ruled Provence from Vienne in the mid-ninth century. His successor in Vienne was Boso I of Arles, who tried to carve out a kingdom of his own in Provence from Vienne in 878–879.

Hugh of Arles was the first known count of Vienne from sometime before 905 until 926, when he was in Italy claiming the Iron Crown of Lombardy. In his absence, Louis the Blind, king of Provence, transferred Vienne to his own son, Charles-Constantine. In September 928, Hugh met with Herbert II of Vermandois and invested Herbert's son Odo with Vienne in opposition to Charles-Constantine. Charles, however, succeeded in reoccupying Vienne by 931 with the aid of Rudolph of France, to whom he gave his fealty. Briefly dispossessed by Hugh Taillefer, an ally of King Hugh, Charles succeeded retaking Vienne in 931 with the aid of Rudolph and his men.

Until 23 June 962, Charles-Constantine ruled Vienne, the former capital of the extinct kingdom of his father. After his death on that date, Vienne was inherited by his daughter Constance and passed to her husband, Boso II of Arles. Boso's descendants accumulated many counties in Provence and succeeded eventually in making themselves margraves of Provence.

In 1030, Vienne was ceded to Archbishop Burchard, however, and he immediately divided the lordship into two counties. He elevated Guigues III of Albon, one of his powerful vassals, to the status of count and he granted Maurienne as a county to Humbert of the White Hands. Nevertheless, a county of Vienne continued to exist in a much diminished form. From 1085 to 1261, it was held by the counts of Mâcon. In the latter year, the last countess, Alice, sold it, along with Mâcon, to King Louis IX of France after the death of her husband, Jehan de Braine, in 1240.

== Sources ==
- Previté-Orton, C. W. "Italy and Provence, 900-950." The English Historical Review, Vol. 32, No. 127. (Jul., 1917), pp 335-347.
