= Stephen III of Auxonne =

Count of Auxonne (died 1241)

Stephen III
- Count of Auxonne
- Died: 1241
- Noble family: House of Ivrea
- Spouses: Beatrix, Countess of Châlon; Agnes of Dreux
- Issue: John, Count of Chalon; Agnes; Clementia; Beatrix
- Father: Stephen II of Auxonne
- Mother: Judith of Lorraine

Stephen (or Étienne) III (died 1241) was Count of Auxonne. He was from the House of Ivrea, son of Stephen II, Count of Auxonne (died after 1173) and Judith of Lorraine (c. 1140 – 1173). He was Stephen III in his House and Stephen II as Count of Auxonne.

Stephen III married, firstly (c. 1186), Beatrix, Countess of Châlon, daughter of William, Count of Chalon and Beatrix, a daughter of Frederick Barbarossa, Holy Roman Emperor), but they divorced between 1197 and 1200.

He married, secondly (before 1212), Agnes of Dreux (1195–1258), daughter of Robert II, Count of Dreux and Yolande de Coucy.

Stephen had issue only from his first marriage to Beatrix, Countess of Châlon:

- John I, Count of Burgundy, Chalon and Lord of Salins. He married three times. His great-granddaughter is Joan II, Countess of Burgundy, wife of King Philip V of France.
- Agnes (died 1223); married to Richard III, Lord de Montfaucon, son of Amadeus II of Montfaucon.
- Clementia (died after 1235); married to Berthold V, Duke of Zähringen
- Beatrix (died 1260); married to Simon de Joinville and had issue: Geoffrey de Geneville, 1st Baron Geneville.

He had also an illegitimate child: Stephen (Etienne), baron d'Oiselet (1208 – after 1267).

== Sources ==
- Bouchard, Constance Brittain (1987). Sword, Miter, and Cloister: Nobility and the Church in Burgundy, 980-1198. Cornell University Press.
- Bumke, Joachim (1991). Courtly Culture: Literature and Society in the High Middle Ages. Translated by Dunlap, Thomas. University of California.
- Richard, Jean (1983). Lloyd, Simon (ed.). Saint Louis, Crusader King of France. Translated by Birrell, Jean. Cambridge University Press.
