= List of counts of Burgundy =

Coat of arms of the Free County of Burgundy until the 13th century.

Coat of arms of the Free County of Burgundy after the 13th century.

This is a list of the counts of Burgundy, i.e., of the region known as Franche-Comté, not to be confused with the Duchy of Burgundy, from 982 to 1678.

== House of Ivrea (982–1184) ==
Name	Date of birth	Date of death	Reign	Relationship with predecessor
Otto William	962	21 September 1026	982 to 21 September 1026	
Reginald I	986	3 September 1057	21 September 1026 to 3 September 1057	his son
William I the Great	1020	12 November 1087	3 September 1057 to 12 November 1087	his son
Reginald II	1061	1097	12 November 1087 to 1097	his son
William II the German	1075	1 March 1127	1097 to January 1125	his son
William III the Child	1110	1 March 1127	January 1125 to 1 March 1127	his son
Stephen I the Rash	1065	27 May 1102	1097 to 27 May 1102	his great-uncle
Reginald III	1093	22 January 1148	27 May 1102 to 22 January 1148	his son
Beatrice I	1143	15 November 1184	22 January 1148 to 15 November 1184; Under regency of William III of Mâcon's till 1156	his daughter
Frederick Barbarossa	1122	10 June 1190	9 June 1156 to 10 June 1190	her husband and co-ruler; afterwards sole-ruler

== House of Hohenstaufen (1190–1231) ==
Name	Date of birth	Date of death	Reign	Relationship with predecessor
Otto I	June/July 1170	13 January 1200	10 June 1190 to 13 January 1200	their son
Joan I	1191	1205	13 January 1200 to 1205	his daughter
Beatrice II	1192	7 May 1231	1205 to 7 May 1231	her sister
Otto II	1180	7 May 1234	21 June 1208 to 7 May 1231	her husband and co-ruler

== House of Andechs (1231–1279) ==
Name	Date of birth	Date of death	Reign	Relationship with predecessor
Otto III	1226	19 June 1248	7 May 1231 to 19 June 1248	their son
Adelaide	1209	8 March 1279	19 June 1248 to 8 March 1279	his sister
Hugh	1220	12 November 1266	19 June 1248 to 12 November 1266	her first husband and co-ruler
Philip I	1207	16 August 1285	11 June 1267 to 8 March 1279	her second husband and co-ruler

== House of Ivrea (1279–1330) ==
Image	Name	Date of birth	Date of death	Reign	Relationship with predecessor
	Otto IV	1248	26 March 1303	8 March 1279 to 26 March 1303	Adelaide's son by Hugh
	Joan II	1291	21 January 1330	26 March 1303 to 21 January 1330	his daughter
	Philip II the Tall	1293	3 January 1322	21 January 1307 to 3 January 1322	her husband and co-ruler

== House of Capet (1330–1347) ==
Image	Name	Date of birth	Date of death	Reign	Relationship with predecessor
	Joan III	2 May 1308	15 August 1347	21 January 1330 to 15 August 1347	their daughter
	Odo	1295	3 April 1349	21 January 1330 to 15 August 1347	her husband and co-ruler

== House of Burgundy (1347–1361) ==
Image	Name	Date of birth	Date of death	Reign	Relationship with predecessor
	Philip III of Rouvres	1346	21 November 1361	15 August 1347 to 21 November 1361	their grandson

== House of Capet (1361–1382) ==
Image	Name	Date of birth	Date of death	Reign	Relationship with predecessor
	Margaret I	1310	9 May 1382	1 November 1361 to 9 May 1382	his great-aunt, and, Joan III's sister

== House of Dampierre (1382–1404) ==
Image	Name	Date of birth	Date of death	Reign	Relationship with predecessor
	Louis I of Mâle	25 October 1330	30 January 1384	9 May 1382 to 30 January 1384	her son
	Margaret II of Dampierre	13 April 1350	16/21 March 1405	30 January 1384 to 16/21 March 1405	his daughter

== House of Valois-Burgundy (1405–1482) ==
Image	Name	Date of birth	Date of death	Reign	Relationship with predecessor
	Philip IV the Bold	15 January 1342	27 April 1404	30 January 1384 to 27 April 1404	her second husband and co-ruler
	John the Fearless	28 May 1371	10 September 1419	16/21 March 1405 to 10 September 1419	their son
	Philip V the Good	31 July 1396	15 June 1467	10 September 1419 to 15 June 1467	his son
	Charles I the Bold	10 November 1433	5 January 1477	15 June 1467 to 5 January 1477	his son
	Mary the Rich	13 February 1457	27 March 1482	5 January 1477 to 27 March 1482	his daughter
	Maximilian	22 March 1459	12 January 1519	5 January 1477 to 27 March 1482	her husband and co-ruler

== House of Habsburg (1482–1678) ==
Image	Name	Date of birth	Date of death	Reign	Relationship with predecessor
	Philip VI the Handsome	22 July 1478	25 September 1506	27 March 1482 to 25 September 1506	their son
	Charles II	24 February 1500	21 September 1558	25 September 1506 to 16 January 1556	his son
	Philip VII	21 May 1527	13 September 1598	16 January 1556 to 13 September 1598	his son
	Isabella Clara Eugenia	12 August 1566	1 December 1633	6 May 1598 to 13 July 1621	his daughter
	Albert	15 November 1559	13 July 1621	6 May 1598 to 13 July 1621	his son-in-law
	Philip VIII	8 April 1605	17 September 1665	31 July 1621 to 17 September 1665	their nephew
	Charles III	6 November 1661	1 November 1700	17 September 1665 to 19 September 1678/1700	his son

In 1678 the County of Burgundy was annexed by France as part of the Treaty of Nijmegen.

=== House of Bourbon, claimants to the title (1700–1713) ===
- Philip IX (King Philip V of Spain) (1700–1713, titular only)

=== House of Habsburg (1713–present) ===
- Charles IV (Emperor Charles VI) (1713–1740 titular only)
- Maria Theresa (1740–1780 titular only)
  - Francis I (Emperor Francis I) (1740–1765 with his wife, titular only)
- Joseph (Emperor Joseph II) (1780–1790 titular only)
- Leopold (Emperor Leopold II) (1790–1792 titular only)
- Francis II (Emperor Francis II) (1792–1795\1835)
- Ferdinand (Emperor Ferdinand I) (1835–1848 titular only)
- Franz Joseph (Emperor Franz Joseph I) (1848–1916 titular only)
- Charles V (Emperor Charles I) (1916–1918 titular only, later renounced)

== See also ==
- Countess of Burgundy
- Kingdom of Burgundy
- King of Burgundy
- Duchy of Burgundy
- Duke of Burgundy
- County of Burgundy
- Dukes of Burgundy family tree
- Count of Poitiers (since John the Magnificent)
