= Beatrice II of Burgundy =

French nobility (1193–1231)

Beatrice
- Died: 7 May 1231
- Spouse: Otto I, Duke of Merania
- Issue: Otto III, Count of Burgundy; Agnes; Beatrix of Andechs-Merania; Adelaide, Countess of Burgundy
- Father: Otto I, Count of Burgundy
- Mother: Margaret, Countess of Blois

Beatrice II (1193 – 7 May 1231) reigned as Countess Palatine of Burgundy from 1205 until her death. She was a member of the Swabian Hohenstaufen dynasty, the daughter of Count Otto I of Burgundy and Countess Margaret of Blois, thereby a granddaughter of Emperor Frederick Barbarossa.

She was born in 1193, younger sister of Countess Joanna I of Burgundy. From the time of her father's assassination at Besançon in 1200, she was next-in-line to the county, eventually succeeding Joanna after her death in 1205. Her uncle Philip of Swabia, German king since 1198, had ensured her Burgundian heritage.

== Marriage and issue ==
In 1208, she married Duke Otto I of Merania. They had:

- Otto III, Count of Burgundy
- Agnes of Merania (1215-1263)
- Beatrice of Merania
- Margaret
- Adelaide, Countess of Burgundy
- Elisabeth

== Sources ==
- Lyon, Jonathan R. (2013). Princely Brothers and Sisters: The Sibling Bond in German Politics, 1100-1250. Cornell University Press.

Beatrice II of Burgundy House of Hohenstaufen Born: 1193 Died: 7 May 1231
Regnal titles
Preceded by Joanna I	Countess of Burgundy; 1205–1231	Succeeded by Otto III
