= Adelaide, Countess of Burgundy =

Countess suo jure of Burgundy from 1248 to 1279

Adelaide of Merania
- Countess of Burgundy, suo jure Countess of Savoy and Bresse
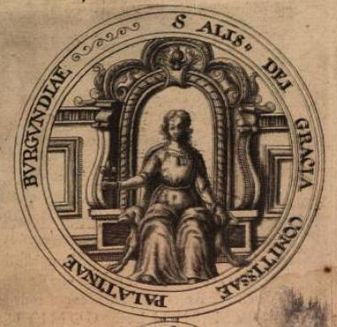
- Died: 8 March 1279; Évian
- Buried: Cherlieu Abbey near Besançon
- Noble family: House of Andechs
- Spouses: Hugh, Count of Salins; Philip I, Count of Savoy
- Father: Otto I, Duke of Merania
- Mother: Beatrice II, Countess of Burgundy

Adelaide of Merania (Adélaïde or Alice, Alix – died 8 March 1279, Évian) was the reigning Countess of Burgundy from 1248 until her death. She was also Countess of Savoy and Bresse through her marriage in 1267 to Count Philip I of Savoy.

== Life ==
Adelaide was the daughter of Duke Otto I of Merania and Countess Beatrice II of Burgundy. She inherited the county after the death of her brother, Otto III, Count Palatine of Burgundy, in 1248. As countess, she came into conflict with King Rudolph I.

Adelaide died in 1279 and was buried in Cherlieu Abbey near Besançon.

== Family ==
Adelaide married Hugh, Count of Salins (died 1266), from a younger branch of the male-line dynasty of Ivrean-originated Counts of Burgundy, around 1239. They had, among others, the following children:

1. Otto IV, Count of Burgundy (died 1302), married

in 1271 to 1. Philippa of Bar
in 1285 to 2. Mahaut of Artois

2. Reginald, Count of Montbéliard (died 1322)
3. John
4. Guia of Burgundy (died 1316), married in 1274 to Thomas III of Savoy, count in Piedmont and pretender of County of Savoy and son of Thomas II of Savoy, thus a nephew of her second husband.
5. Hugh (died 1312)
6. Police (Hippolyta), married to Aymer IV, Count of Valence (1277–1330)
7. Elizabeth (d. 1275), married in 1250 to Hartman the Young, Count of Kyburg (d. 1263) and had a daughter:

Anne, married in 1273 to Eberhard of Habsburg-Laufenburg

On 11 June 1267, Adelaide married Philip, the former archbishop of Lyon who inherited the County of Savoy the following year (died 1285). The marriage remained childless.

Adelaide, Countess of Burgundy House of Andechs Died: 8 March 1279
Regnal titles
Preceded by Otto III	Countess of Burgundy; 1248–1279	Succeeded by Otto IV
Royal titles
Preceded by Agnes of Faucigny	Countess consort of Savoy; 1268–1279	Succeeded by Sybille of Bâgé
