= Hugh, Count of Burgundy =

Nobleman; 3rd of that name; 1220–1266

Hugh III of Châlon
- Count of Burgundy, jure uxoris
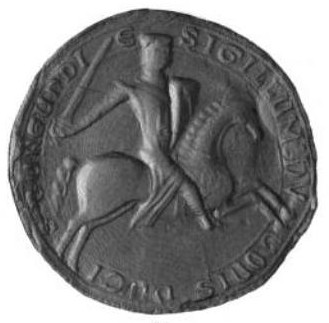
- Seal of Hugh III of Burgundy
- Born: 1220
- Died: 1266 (aged 45–46)
- Noble family: House of Ivrea
- Spouse: Adelaide I of Burgundy
- Issue: Otto IV, Count of Burgundy; Reginald of Burgundy
- Father: John, Count of Chalon
- Mother: Mahaud of Burgundy

Hugh of Chalon (French: Hugues; 1220–1266) was count of Burgundy by his marriage to Adelaide, Countess of Burgundy, on 1 November 1236, when he was aged 16. He was the son of John, Count of Chalon, and his first wife, Mahat, daughter of Hugh III, Duke of Burgundy.

== Marriage and issue ==
Hugh and Adelaide had:

- Otto IV, Count of Burgundy (born 1248)
- Hugh (fl. 1312), Lord of Montbrison and Aspremont, married Bonne daughter of Amadeus V, Count of Savoy
- Étienne (died 1299)
- Reginald of Burgundy (died 1322), Count of Montbéliard by his marriage to Guillemette of Neufchâtel
- Henri
- Jean (died 1302), Lord of Montaigu
- Alix, nun at Fontevraud Abbey
- Elisabeth (died 1275), married Count Hartmann V of Kyburg
- Hippolyte, Lady of Saint-Vallier, married Count Aymar IV of Poitiers and Diois
- Guyonne of Burgundy (died 1316), married Thomas III of Piedmont
- Marguerite, nun at Fontevraud Abbey
- Agnès, Lady of Saint-Aubin, married Count Philippe II de Vienne, Lord of Pagny

Hugh III's wife remarried to Philip I, Count of Savoy, a year after his death and she was succeeded as count by Otto, one of her children by Hugh.

== Sources ==
- Cox, Eugene (1999). "The kingdom of Burgundy, the lands of the house of Savoy and adjacent territories". In Abulafia, David (ed.). The New Cambridge Medieval History: Volume 5, C.1198-c.1300. Cambridge University Press.
- Jackson-Laufer, Guida Myrl (1999). Women Rulers Throughout the Ages: An Illustrated Guide. ABC-CLIO. ISBN 9781576070918.
- Kinkade, Richard P. (2004). "Beatrice "Contesson" of Savoy (c. 1250-1290): The Mother of Juan Manuel". La corónica: A Journal of Medieval Hispanic Languages, Literatures, and Cultures. 2 (3, Summer): 163–225.
