= Reginald III of Burgundy =

Count of Burgundy from 1127 to 1148

Reginald III, Count of Burgundy
- Born: c. 1087
- Died: 1148
- Noble family: Ivrea
- Spouse: Agatha of Lorraine
- Issue: Beatrice I
- Father: Stephen I, Count of Burgundy
- Mother: Beatrice of Lorraine, Countess of Burgundy

Reginald III (French: Renaud; c. 1087 – 1148), son of Stephen I and Beatrice of Lorraine, was the count of Burgundy between 1127 and 1148. Previously, he had been the count of Mâcon since his father's death in 1102, with his brother, William of Vienne. His mother, Beatrice of Lorraine, was the daughter of Gerard, Duke of Lorraine. Pope Callixtus II was Reginald's paternal uncle.

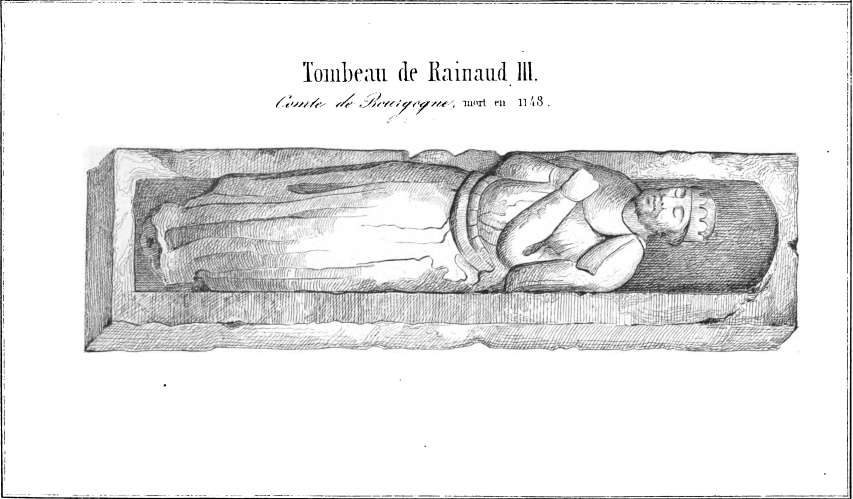
Reginald's tomb

Reginald proclaimed independence from Emperor Lothair III, but was defeated by King Conrad III of Germany and forced to relinquish all his lands east of the Jura Mountains. The name of the region Franche-Comté is derived from his title, franc-compte, meaning "free count".

About 1142, Reginald married Agatha, daughter of Duke Simon I of Lorraine. They had a daughter, Beatrice I.

In 1148, Reginald was traveling in France when he fell ill with multiple illnesses. He died so suddenly that he could not even appoint a regent for his young daughter, Beatrice I, who succeeded him.

== Sources ==
- Foerster, Thomas (2016). "Crossing the Alps and Crossing the Channel. The 'Empires' of Frederick I and Henry II". In Plassman, Alheydis; Buschkin, Dominik (eds.). Staufen and Plantagenets: Two Empires in Comparison. Bonn University Press.
- Gislebertus (of Mons) (2005). Chronicle of Hainaut. Translated by Napran, Laura. The Boydell Press.
- Bouchard, Constance Brittain (1987). Sword, Miter, and Cloister: Nobility and the Church in Burgundy, 980-1198. Cornell University Press.
- McKitterick, Rosamond; Abulafia, David, eds. (1999). The New Cambridge Medieval History: Volume 5, C.1198-c.1300. Cambridge University Press.

Reginald III of Burgundy House of Ivrea Born: c. 1093 Died: 1148
Regnal titles
Preceded by Stephen I	Count of Burgundy; 1127–1148	Succeeded by Beatrice I
