= Letter on the Death of the Emperor Frederick =

Latin letter about the death of the Emperor Frederick Barbarossa

When the lord emperor was crossing by way of a certain shortcut a certain very rapid stream amidst the mountain gorges and the water had received him safely upon its opposite bank, he ate lunch there. After the innumerable and unbearable labors which he had endured now for a month, he wished to bathe in this water and to swim in order to cool himself off. He drowned by the hidden judgment of God in a lamentable and unexpected accident.

— account of Frederick's death in the Letter

The Letter on the Death of the Emperor Frederick (Latin: Epistola de morte Friderici imperatoris) is an anonymous Latin newsletter about the sudden death of the Emperor Frederick Barbarossa on 10 June 1190 during the Third Crusade. The letter was written by an eyewitness before the crusader army arrived at Antioch on 19 June. It begins with the reception of Frederick's crusade by Béla III of Hungary on 4 June 1189, followed by a brief account its progress through Hungary, Byzantium and Turkey. It ends with the army's arrival in Tarsus on 17 June 1190.

While the Letter is anonymous, there are indications that its author was a clergyman from the Rhineland. He compares the size of the Turkish capital, Iconium, to that of Cologne. The letter is addressed to "your holiness" (vestra sanctitas), which may be a religious body, a bishop or perhaps the pope. The Latin text's most recent editor argued, on the basis of poor Latinity and unimpressive Biblical allusions, that the author was a low-ranking cleric. On the other hand, it has been argued that author may have been Bishop Godfrey of Würzburg, Frederick's former chancellor, who died at Antioch in July, only a month after the letter was written.

The Letter is preserved in two manuscripts: Wolfenbüttel 239 and Turin, Accademia di Scienze, M.M.V. 11. In the former, which dates to the early thirteenth century, it is appended to a copy of the Gesta Friderici imperatoris, a biography of Frederick by Bishop Otto I of Freising and Rahewin. This manuscript originated in the monastery of Sittich. The Turin manuscript dates to either the early thirteenth century or the fourteenth. It also contains the Narratio de itinere navali peregrinorum, another account of the Third Crusade.

The Letter does not seem to have been used by the author of the Historia de expeditione Friderici imperatoris, although newsletters like it were one of his main sources of information.

== Editions ==
- Anton Chroust (ed.), Quellen zur Geschichte des Kreuzzuges Kaiser Friedrichs I., Monumenta Germaniae Historica, Scriptores rerum Germanicarum, n.s. V (Berlin, 1928), pp. 173–178.
  - Translated into English by Graham A. Loud, "A Letter Concerning the Death of the Emperor Frederick", in The Crusade of Frederick Barbarossa: The History of the Expedition of the Emperor Frederick and Related Texts (Ashgate, 2010), pp. 169–172 (introduction at pp. 8–9).
- Franz-Josef Schmale (ed. and trans.), Italienische Quellen über die Taten Kaiser Friedrichs I. in Italien und der Brief über den Kreuzzug Kaiser Friedrichs I (Darmstadt: Wissenschaftliche Buchgesellschaft, 1986), pp. 372–382.
  - Translated into English by William L. North, "Letter on the Sacred Expedition of the Emperor Frederick I", The Haskins Society.
