= Tageno =

Tageno (died 1190) was a Bavarian clergyman and crusader. He was a minor cleric of the cathedral of Passau from at least July 1183. He became dean of the cathedral in 1187 and joined the army of Frederick Barbarossa on the Third Crusade in 1189. He wrote an account in Latin of his experience, known as the Descriptio expeditionis Asiaticae Friderici ("Description of the Asian Expedition of Frederick"), covering the period from 1189 down to 21 June 1190. According to the Historia de expeditione Friderici imperatoris, which plagiarized his Descriptio, Tageno died at Tripoli in the autumn of 1190.

No independent copy of Tageno's account survives. It is known only from its incorporation into other works. The Historia de expeditione incorporates Tageno's account of the period from 16 May to 9 June 1190 almost verbatim, including the use of the first person. The entirety of the Descriptio was incorporated into the chronicle of Magnus of Reichersberg, who died in 1195. Magnus occasionally alters Tageno's first person to the third person, and he may have made other alterations to the text. Furthermore, he probably had access to an early draft of the Historia de expeditione, meaning that their texts are not independent witnesses to the original Descriptio. Magnus calls the Descriptio simply a "record" (memoria). Graham Loud considers it almost a diary.

A slightly different version of Tageno's Descriptio from that in Magnus appeared in a book published by the Bavarian humanist Johannes Aventinus in 1522. It is unknown if Aventinus had access to the original text or was relying on a version of Magnus's chronicle. The differences between the two versions of the Descriptio are largely stylistic and may reflect Aventinus emendation of the text in accordance with humanistic notions of Latinity.

== Bibliography ==
- Freed, John (2016). Frederick Barbarossa: The Prince and the Myth. Yale University Press. ISBN 978-0-300-122763.
- Güterbock, Ferdinand (1941). "Il Diario di Tageno e altre fonti della terza Crociata". Bullettino dell'Istituto Storico Italiano per le Medio Evo. 55: 223–269.
- Loud, Graham A. (2010). The Crusade of Frederick Barbarossa: The History of the Expedition of the Emperor Frederick and Related Texts. Ashgate. ISBN 9780754665755.
- Thompson, James Westfall (1942). A History of Historical Writing. Vol. 1. Macmillan.
