= Curia Christi =

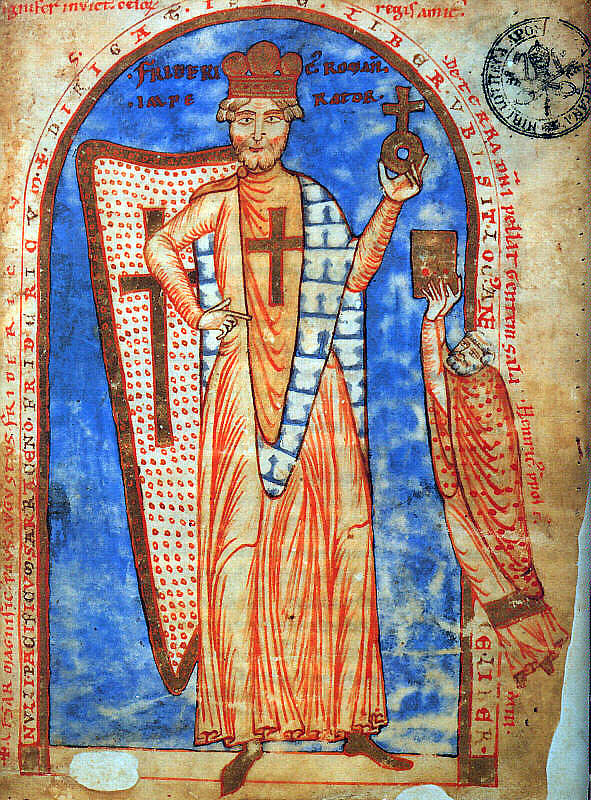
Frederick Barbarossa depicted as a crusader from a copy of the Historia Hierosolymitana made in 1188.

The Curia Christi ("Court of Christ") or Curia Dei ("Court of God") was a diet or court day (Hoftag) of the Holy Roman Empire held in Mainz on 27 March 1188. It was so called because it was notionally under the presidency of Jesus Christ as king of kings. It was the occasion both for the public resolution of the conflict between Emperor Frederick Barbarossa and Archbishop Philip of Cologne and for the emperor's "taking of the cross", when he vowed to lead an army on the Third Crusade.

== Sources ==
The Curia Christi is a well recorded event. It is mentioned in the Royal Chronicle of Cologne, the Chronicle of Magnus of Reichersberg, the Chronicle of Otto of Sankt Blasien and the Chronicle of the Slavs of Arnold of Lübeck. The History of the Expedition of the Emperor Frederick and the History of the Pilgrims are the source for the names Curia Christi and Curia Dei, respectively. The History of the Expedition includes the text of a letter sent by Cardinal Henry of Marcy to the nobility of Germany enjoining them to attend the "court of Jesus Christ" (curia Jesu Christi). The same history records that Frederick called the diet on the cardinal's advice and that the name "court of Christ" was Frederick's choice.

== Background ==
The Curia Christi was called to deal with two issues: the conflict, internal to the Empire, between the emperor and the archbishop of Cologne; and the fall of Jerusalem to the Ayyubids. The conflict between emperor and archbishop has been traced to Frederick's privileging the cities of Aachen and Duisburg at the expense of the economy of Cologne. It has also been suggested that the emperor bore a grudge against Philip for engineering the downfall of the emperor's cousin, Henry the Lion, in 1180. Another proposed cause of the conflict was Philip's siding with Pope Urban III over the disputed archbishopric of Trier. Open conflict began when Philip refused to allow an imperial army to cross his territory and Frederick responded by imposing an embargo on Cologne on 25 July 1187.

On 15 August 1187, at a diet in Worms, Frederick began legal proceedings against Philip, who had disobeyed a summons to attend. He was summoned to attend the next diet in Strasbourg, which convened around 1 December 1187. He disobeyed that summons also. At Christmas in Trier, Frederick lamented the fact that he would have to devastate imperial territory to bring Philip to heel. Nevertheless, Philip attended the diet of Nuremberg on 2 February 1188. A final legal decision—and thus Philip's public submission—was postponed to the next diet in Mainz.

The resolution of the conflict was brought about in no small part by the fall of Jerusalem (2 October 1187) and the death of Urban III (20 October). Urban's successor, Gregory VIII, threw himself fully behind a new crusade and moved quickly to resolve his differences with the emperor.

== Diet of 27 March 1188 in Mainz ==
The choice of date for the Curia Christi was loaded with significance. It was scheduled for Laetare Sunday, 27 March, the anniversary of Frederick's coronation as King of the Romans in 1152. The introit for that day's Mass, taken from Isaiah 66:10 ("Rejoice with Jerusalem, and be glad for her, all you who love her; rejoice with her in joy, all you who mourn over her"), aligned perfectly with the purpose of the diet. The designation Curia Christi was Frederick's own. He refused to preside over the assembly himself in acknowledgement of Christ's kingship over kings. There is some doubt, however, whether the throne was really vacant during the diet or whether such references in the sources are literary devices not to be taken literally.

=== Protection of Jews ===
Attendees began arriving in Mainz on 9 March. According to a letter sent by Rabbi Moses ha-Cohen of Mainz to his brother-in-law, Eleazar of Worms, a mob gathered in the marketplace intending to invade the Jewish quarter on 26 March (Sabbath). It was dispersed by the imperial marshal Henry of Kalden. The rabbi then met with the emperor, who issued an edict threatening maiming or death for anyone who maimed or killed a Jew. After the diet, on 29 March, Frederick and Rabbi Moses rode together through the streets of Mainz to demonstrate that the Jews had imperial protection. Frederick's measures were successful. While the First and Second Crusades in Germany had been marred by violence against the Jews and the Third Crusade itself occasioned an outbreak of violence against the Jews in England, there was no such violence in Germany in 1188.

=== Peace between emperor and archbishop ===
At the diet, peace was made between Frederick and Philip by Cardinal Henry of Marcy. Philip had to swear three oaths: two for his absence at Worms and Strasbourg and one for his defiance of an imperial prohibition on taxing the Jews. He also had to pay a fine of 2,000 marks to Frederick personally and another 200 marks to the court. Symbolically, he was ordered to destroy one of Cologne's gates and to fill in its moat at four places. These symbolic orders were intended only to demonstrate publicly Philip's submission; they were rescinded by imperial prerogative the following day (28 March). Less symbolically, the citizens of Cologne were ordered to destroy their newly built wall in four places. This order was not rescinded.

=== Crusade ===
Following the submission of Philip, a letter concerning the fall of Jerusalem was read to the assembly and Bishop Godfrey of Würzburg preached a crusade sermon. Henry of Marcy, who had been charged with preaching the crusade in Germany, probably also read out Gregory VIII's letter Audita tremendi authorising a new crusade. Frederick then asked the assembly whether he should go to the aid of the beleaguered Kingdom of Jerusalem. At the insistence of the assembly, Frederick "took the cross" from Henry of Marcy. He was followed by his son, Duke Frederick VI of Swabia, and by Duke Frederick of Bohemia, Duke Leopold V of Austria, Landgrave Louis III of Thuringia and a host of bishops, lords and knights.

In accordance with the pope's instructions, Frederick proclaimed a "general expedition against the pagans". He set the period of preparation for 17 April 1188 to 8 April 1189 and scheduled a general muster at Regensburg for 23 April 1189, another day of symbolic significance since it was the feast of Saint George, patron saint of knights. To prevent the crusade from degenerating into an undisciplined mob, participants were required to have at least three marks of funding, enough to support oneself for two years.

In a separate piece of business, the Curia Christi summoned the disgraced Henry the Lion to attend the diet of Goslar (25 July–8 August 1188). He was given the option of complete restoration if he joined the crusade. He refused and went into exile in England.

== Bibliography ==
- Bysted, Ane L. (2014). The Crusade Indulgence: Spiritual Rewards and the Theology of the Crusades, c. 1095–1216. Brill.
- Freed, John B. (2016). Frederick Barbarossa: The Prince and the Myth. New Haven, CT: Yale University Press. ISBN 978-0-300-122763.
- Loud, Graham A., ed. (2010). The Crusade of Frederick Barbarossa: The History of the Expedition of the Emperor Frederick and Related Texts. Ashgate. ISBN 9780754665755.
- Wentzlaff-Eggebert, Friedrich Wilhelm (1962). Der Hoftag Jesu Christi 1188 in Mainz. Franz Steiner.
