= Godfrey of Spitzenberg =

Bishop of Würzburg

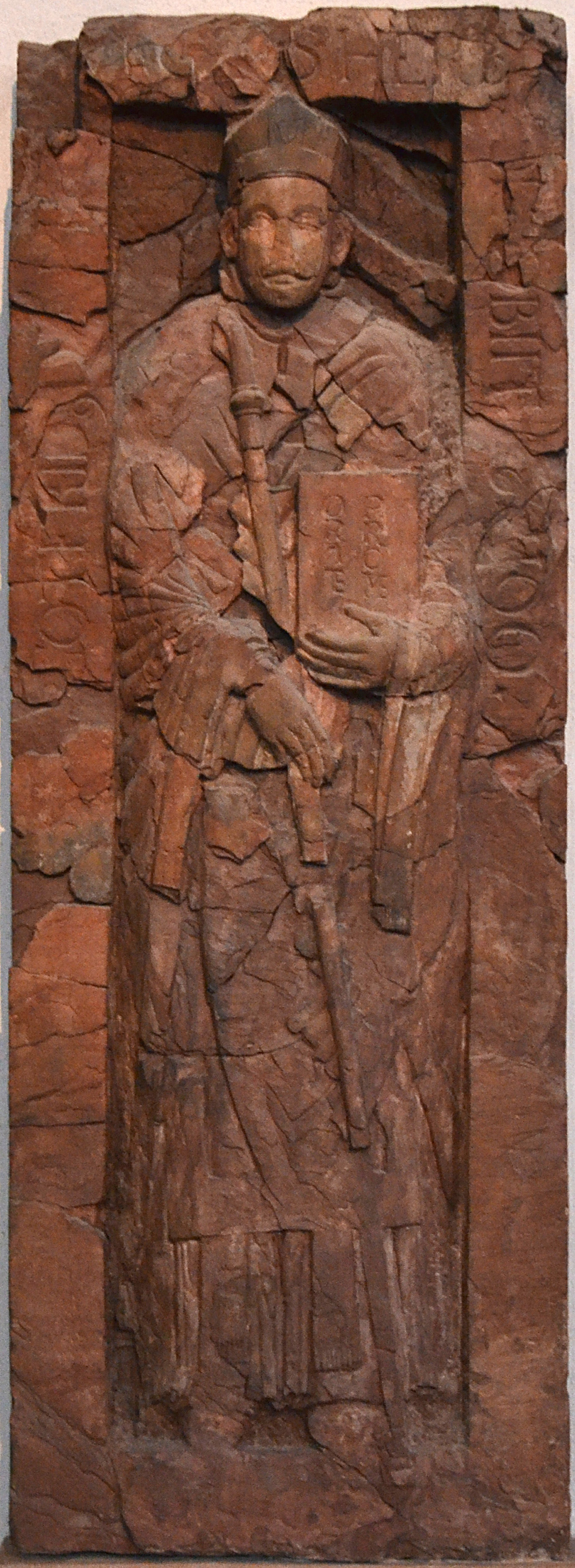
Godfrey of Spitzenberg's tomb in Würzburg Cathedral

Godfrey of Spitzenberg (1132 – July 8, 1190 in Antioch) was a close confidant of Emperor Frederick I and bishop of Regensburg and Würzburg.

Godfrey was the son of Rudolf I of Sigmaringen and his wife Adelheid. He belonged to the Sigmaringen-Spitzenberg family which was formed by the marriage of Richinza, daughter of Berthold II, Duke of Carinthia, and Louis of Sigmaringen, progenitor of the House of Helfenstein.

He studied law in Bologna and theology in Paris. In 1172, he became capitular in Würzburg and imperial court chancellor for Frederick I. In the following years, he took part in the Italian campaigns against the Lombard League, and was instrumental in the conclusion of the Treaty of Venice in 1177. In 1184–85, Godfrey held the office of general legate in Italy in addition to the office of chancellor. On June 18, 1185, he was elected bishop of Regensburg. In 1186, Bishop Reginhard von Abenberg died in Würzburg, and Godfrey was elected successor and thus retired from the imperial service.

In 1187, the Muslim Sultan Saladin succeeded in defeating the Christian army of the crusader states in the Battle of Hattin. At the Diet in Strasbourg, papal envoys reported on the loss of Jerusalem, and demanded that the Holy Places be recaptured. On 27 March 1188, at the Diet of Mainz, Godfrey preached a crusade sermon and Frederick asked the assembly whether he should take the cross. It was decided to gather a crusade army in Regensburg the following year in order to reconquer the Holy Land. The army, which Godfrey also joined, had marched across the Balkans and crossed Asia Minor against fierce resistance, until Emperor Frederick I drowned in the Saleph River in 1190. Subsequently, in Antioch, many of the crusaders contracted disease; Godfrey also died from it on July 8, 1190.

Before his death, Godfrey had determined that his right hand should be brought to Würzburg. The hand was severed from the corpse and sent on a journey to Würzburg. The messengers were probably attacked by robbers who suspected valuable items in the cassette they were carrying. In any case, the hand got lost on the way and so today only the grave slab of Bishop Godfrey is in the Würzburg Cathedral.

Godfrey may have been the author of the anonymous Letter on the Death of the Emperor Frederick.

== Bibliography ==
- Freed, John (2016). Frederick Barbarossa: The Prince and the Myth. Yale University Press.
- Junginger, Helmut (2003). "Lebenslauf des Gottfried von Spitzenberg" (PDF) (in German).
- Loud, Graham A., ed. (2010). The Crusade of Frederick Barbarossa: The History of the Expedition of the Emperor Frederick and Related Texts. Ashgate.
- Wendehorst, Alfred (1964). Gottfried I. Graf v. Spitzenberg-Helfenstein (in German). Berlin: Duncker & Humblot. ISBN 3-428-00187-7.
