= History of the Pilgrims =

The History of the Pilgrims (Latin: Historia peregrinorum) is an anonymous Latin account of the expedition of the Emperor Frederick Barbarossa during the Third Crusade (1189–90). It was written not long after events, possibly even before the death of the Emperor Henry VI (1197). It is divided into three sections on the conquests of Saladin, the preparations for the crusade and the crusade itself. The first section contains the most original material and the final section is the longest. It ends abruptly with the death of Barbarossa. The sole surviving manuscript, made in the early 13th century at Salem Abbey, is not quite complete and seems to be missing the last sentences.

The History of the Pilgrims is pro-imperial in stance, but not uncritically so. It is not an eyewitness account and draws on the earlier Historia de expeditione Friderici imperatoris, which it augments with material drawn from eyewitnesses and other now lost notices. Among the latter was probably a tract on Conrad of Montferrat's campaign in Palestine, since his defence of Tyre (1187) is covered in the first part covering Saladin's conquests. Conrad's father, William V, was one of Barbarossa's closest Italian allies. The History may also make use of the Marbach Annals, or perhaps of a lost common source, for its coverage of the assembly of Strasbourg (1187) and the "Court of Christ" (1188).

The anonymous author was probably from Swabia, judging by his knowledge of individual Swabian knights. He may have been a monk of Salem.

== Bibliography ==
- Freed, John (2016). Frederick Barbarossa: The Prince and the Myth. Yale University Press.
- Loud, Graham A., ed. (2010). The Crusade of Frederick Barbarossa: The History of the Expedition of the Emperor Frederick and Related Texts. Ashgate.
