= History of the Expedition of the Emperor Frederick =

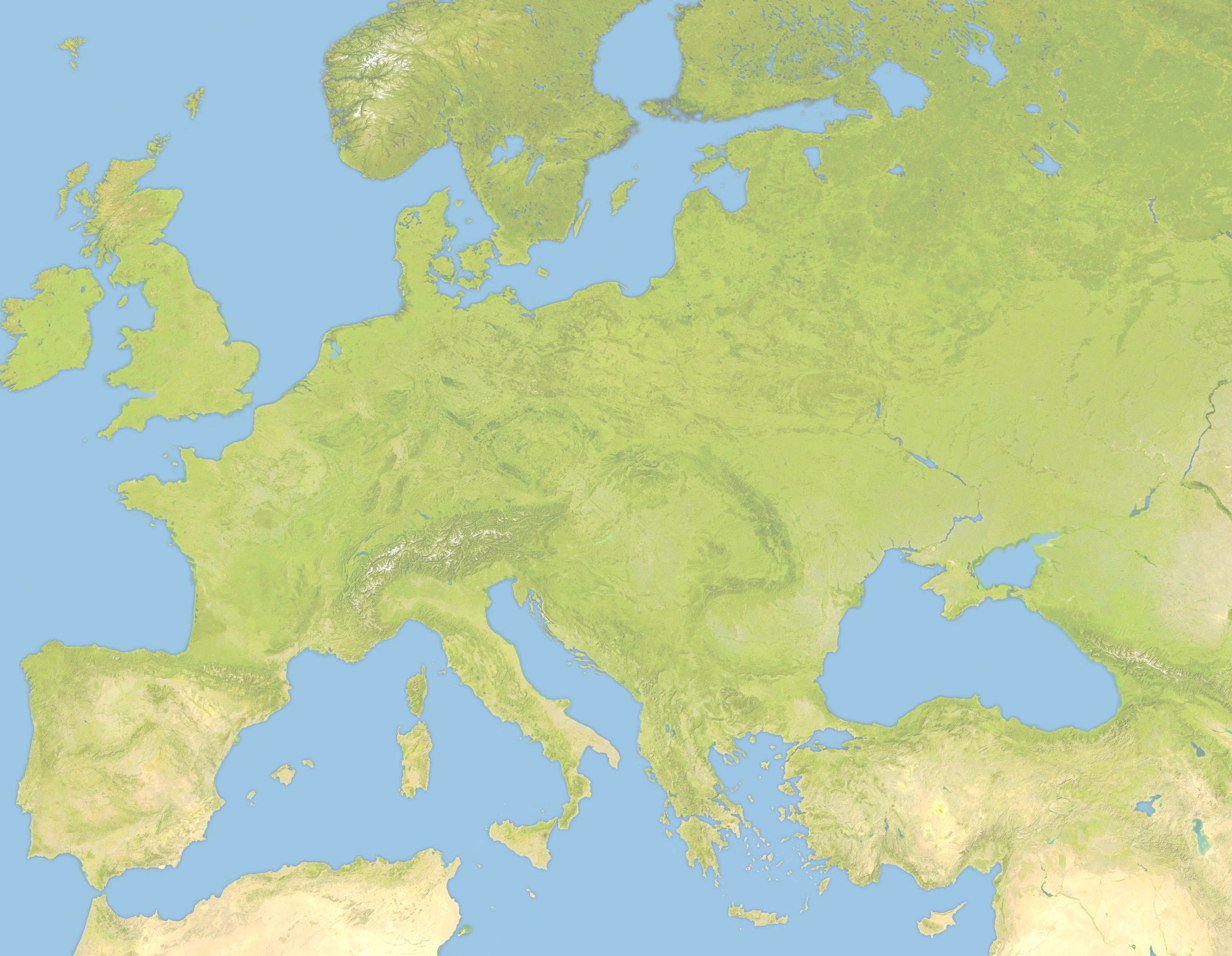
Key stops along the route of Barbarossa's crusade from his taking the cross at Haguenau to his death near Seleucia

The History of the Expedition of the Emperor Frederick (Latin: Historia de expeditione Friderici imperatoris) is an anonymous Latin account of the campaign waged by Frederick I, Holy Roman Emperor, as part of the Third Crusade. It covers the period 1187–1196, but is centred on the expedition of 1189–1190.

It appears to be a composite work, compiled from pieces written while the expedition was underway with a preface and an appendix added. Very early manuscript copies survive, but it is only a later 13th-century notice that first gives an author's name, Ansbert. This may be the name of the author or perhaps the compiler, but it is uncertain. The work is associated with Bavaria and Austria.

It provides a nearly day-to-day account of the expedition as it crossed the Balkans and Anatolia before the sudden death of Frederick I in a swimming accident. It is the most detailed surviving account of the expedition and it relies mainly on eyewitness reports.

== Date, authorship and manuscripts ==
The History is a contemporary account, having attained its finished form no later than about 1200. An early draft appears to have existed before 1195. The final form cannot be earlier than the summer of 1196. Frederick's son and successor, the Emperor Henry VI, who died in September 1197, is referred to throughout as living. Parts of the work appear to have been written contemporaneously with events, as shown by references to certain persons as still living (e.g., Count Philip of Flanders, who died at the siege of Acre in 1191).

The earliest surviving copy was made around 1200 in the Benedictine abbey of Saint Lambrecht in Styria. This incomplete copy contains only a third of the text. Another very earlier surviving copy was made at the Praemonstratensian monastery of Milevsko (Mühlhausen) in Bohemia before 1221. It is also incomplete. The full text is only known from two copies commissioned in the 18th century by the Moravian antiquarian and abbot Josef Piter. These copies were not made from either of the known earlier manuscripts.

In the Milevsko manuscript, Abbot Gerlach added a notice of the work's title and authorship: "The History of the Expedition of the Emperor Frederick, written by an Austrian cleric who was present on this same". Later in the 13th century, somebody added the authors name: "called Ansbert". Since neither notice is particularly late, some scholars have taken them at face value. Others have questioned the name or even the implication of Gerlach's notice that the work was the product of a single author. The hands of multiple authors have been seen in the variations of cursus employed in different sections. It is possible, given the distribution of references to Austria, that only the last part was written by an Austrian cleric, who may also have been the compiler of the whole. The earlier parts appear to have been written in the diocese of Passau.

== Structure and sources ==
The History is composed of three distinct parts: a preface concerning the fall of Jerusalem in 1187 and the planning of the crusade, the long central account of Frederick's crusade and what amounts to an appendix about the reign of Henry VI down to the summer of 1196, when he left Germany on his planned crusade. This last part is a quarter of the length of the middle section.

The preface of the History quotes several other texts at length: Pope Gregory VIII's bull Audita tremendi, calling for the Third Crusade; an anonymous letter to the master of the Hospitallers in Italy, Archumbald, describing the Battle of Hattin, one of the most important sources for that battle; and a letter of the steward of the Hospitallers in Jerusalem, Hermengar, to Duke Leopold V of Austria, detailing Saladin's conquests in northern Syria in 1188. The central section of the History shows evidence of having been composed in parts out of reports sent back to Germany by the army. It covers the period from the setting out in May 1189 until Frederick's death in June 1190. Anton Chroust suggested that there are three sections composed separately. The first would end in November 1189, when Frederick is recorded as sending back reports to Henry VI and King Béla III of Hungary, and the second at Easter 1190, when a report seems to have been sent back to the Empire with some Pisan merchants. The third section, beginning from 29 March 1190, quotes extensively from an eyewitness account, the diary of the Bavarian cleric Tageno. The period from 16 May to 9 June 1190 is drawn almost verbatim from Tageno.

It has been argued that Ansbert may have been a participant in the crusade and the author of the three reports on which the main sections were based.

== Uses ==
The History was used by Gerlach, who quotes it in his own continuation of the chronicle of Vincent of Prague. An early draft of the History was also used by Magnus of Reichersberg, who died in 1195, for his chronicle. The anonymous author of the History of the Pilgrims, another account of Frederick I's crusade, also had access to the History of the Expedition around 1200.

The History is weak on background. It provides an account of the preaching of the crusade and of the Curia Christi (27 March 1188), but little on the political or diplomatic preparations. For the expedition itself, it provides an almost day-to-day account that is much more detailed than any preceding crusade chronicle. In contrast to the History of the Pilgrims, it names dates and places, allowing the reader to trace the army's march and even to calculate its speed (20 kilometres [12 mi] per day in hostile territory). It also lists 70 participating noblemen and churchmen, a more thorough list than exists for most crusades. Besides Duke Frederick VI of Swabia and Duke Berthold of Merania, there were eleven bishops from Germany and one from Hungary, two margraves and twenty-six counts.

The History is the best source for Frederick's relations with the Greeks, superior to the main Greek source, Niketas Choniates.

== Bibliography ==
- Bláhová, Marie (2016). "Ansbert". In Graeme Dunphy; Cristian Bratu (eds.). Encyclopedia of the Medieval Chronicle. Brill Online. doi:10.1163/2213-2139_emc_SIM_000750.
- Freed, John (2016). Frederick Barbarossa: The Prince and the Myth. Yale University Press.
- Isoaho, Mari H. (2017). "Battle for Jerusalem in Kievan Rus': Igor's Campaign (1185) and the Battle of Hattin (1187)" (PDF). Palaeoslavica. 25 (2): 38–62.
- Loud, Graham, ed. (2010). The Crusade of Frederick Barbarossa: The History of the Expedition of the Emperor Frederick and Related Texts. Ashgate.
