= Magnus of Reichersberg =

Clergyman and historian from the 12th century

Magnus of Reichersberg (died 12 April 1195) was an Augustinian canon and historian who worked at Reichersberg Abbey from the 1160s.

He wrote a Latin chronicle of Reichersberg covering the years 1167–1195. This was a continuation of the annals of Gerhoh of Reichersberg, whose political and ecclesiastical ideas are reflected in Magnus' work. Although he was a supporter of Pope Alexander III, he was not ill-disposed to the Emperor Frederick I, Alexander's chief rival. He is an important source for Frederick's participation in the Third Crusade (1189–1190). He incorporated into his chronicle the diary of Tageno, a copy of which was sent to him from the Holy Land; a letter from Bishop Diepold of Passau; an anonymous letter to the master of the Knights Hospitaller in Italy, Archembald, about the battle of Hattin; and a letter by Terricus, preceptor of the Knights Templar, and a survivor of Hattin. He also made use of an early draft of the History of the Expedition of the Emperor Frederick.

Continuations added to his chronicle after his death bring it down to 1279. The first continuator records Magnus' date of death.
