= Excarnation =

Burial preparation

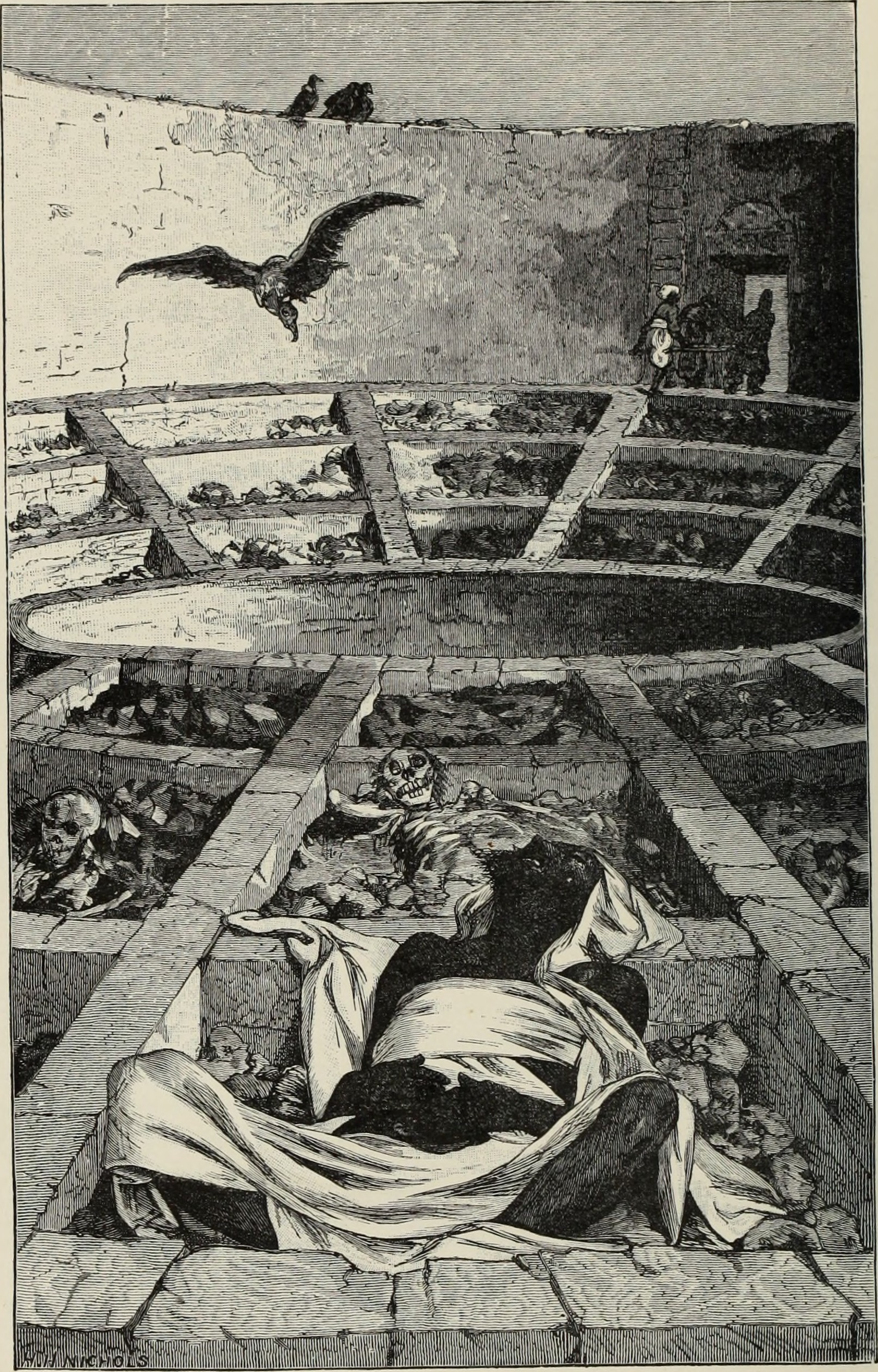
Zoroastrian Towers of Silence are examples of excarnation.

In archaeology and anthropology, the term excarnation (also known as defleshing) refers to the practice of removing the flesh and organs of the dead before burial. Excarnation may be achieved through natural means, such as leaving a dead body exposed to the elements or for animals to scavenge; or by butchering the corpse by hand. Following excarnation, some societies retrieved the excarnated bones for burial. Excarnation has been practiced throughout the world for hundreds of thousands of years. The earliest archaeological evidence of excarnation is from the Awash River Valley in Ethiopia, 160,000 years ago. Examples of excarnation include "sky burials" in parts of Asia, the Zoroastrian "Tower of Silence", and Native American "tree burials". Excarnation is practiced for a variety of spiritual and practical reasons, including the Tibetian spiritual belief that excarnation is the most generous form of burial and the Comanche practical concern that in the winter the ground is too hard for an underground burial. Excarnation sites are identifiable in the archaeological record by a concentration of smaller bones (like fingers or toes), which would be the bones that would be the easiest to fall off the body, and that would not be noticed by practitioners of excarnation.

== Methodology ==
=== Identification of excarnation ===
From the pattern of marks on some human bones at prehistoric sites, researchers have inferred that members of the community removed the flesh from the bones as part of its burial practices.

Since metatarsals, finger bones and toe bones are very small, they would easily fall through gaps in a woven structure or roll off the side during this removal. Thus a site where only small bones are found is suggestive of ritual excarnation.

=== Distinguishing excarnation from cannibalism ===
Archaeologists seeking to study the practice of ritual excarnation in the archeological record must differentiate between the removal of flesh as a burial practice, and as a precursor to cannibalism. When human bones exhibiting signs of flesh removal are discovered in the fossil record, a variety of criteria can be used to distinguish between the two. One common approach is to compare the tool marks and other cuts on the bones with butchered animal bones from the same site, with the assumption that cannibalized humans would have been prepared like any other meat, whereas excarnated bodies would be prepared differently. Cannibalized bones, in contrast to excarnated bones, may also exhibit telltale signs such as human tooth marks, broken long bones (to facilitate marrow extraction), and signs of cooking, such as "pot polishing". Pot polishing refers to the smoothing and beveling that is observed in bones that have come into contact with the abrasive inner surface of a cooking vessel.

== By region ==
=== Africa ===
==== Ethiopia ====
160,000 years ago, Homo sapiens idaltu in the Awash River Valley (near present-day Herto village, Ethiopia) practiced excarnation.

=== Asia ===
==== India ====
The Parsis in Mumbai maintain a hilltop reserve, the Doongerwadi forest, in Malabar Hill with several Towers of Silence. Due to a decline in vultures in India (due to changes in animal husbandry practices) the traditional excarnation practice has faced pressure to evolve while still serving the same purpose, so the trustees of the reserve introduced solar concentrators at the towers. Other scavenger birds play a part but are not as efficient as vultures.

==== Tibet ====
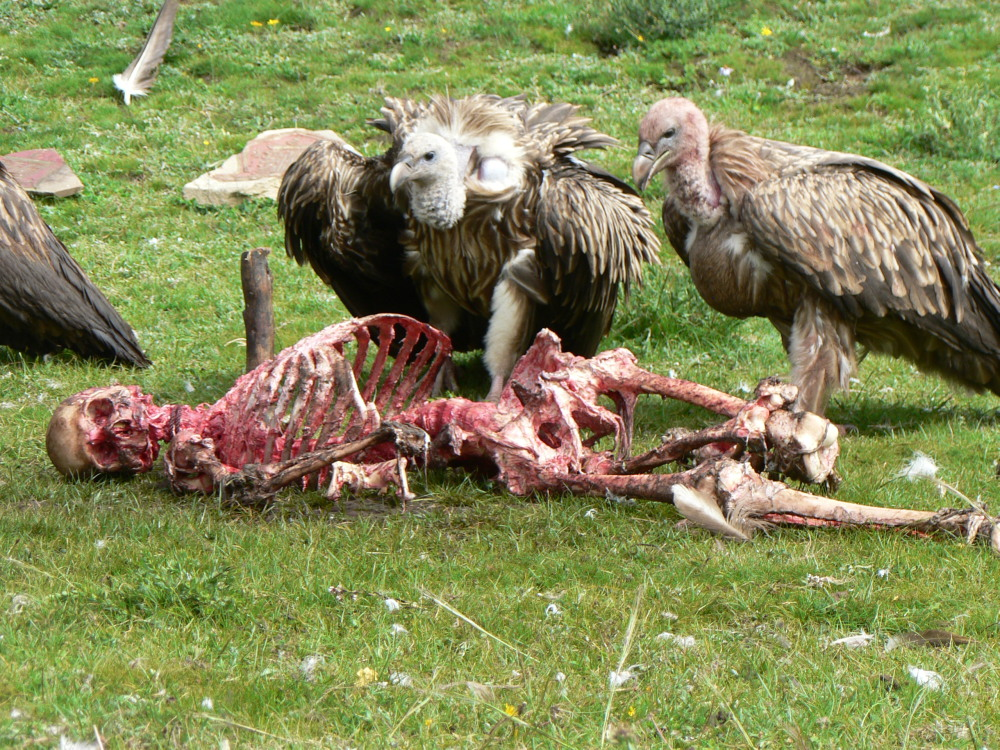
A Tibetan sky burial

Practices making use of natural processes for excarnation include Tibetan sky burials. Archaeologists believe that in this practice, people typically left the body exposed on a woven litter or altar. Following excarnation, the litter with its remains would be removed from the site.

==== Japan ====
In modern Japan, where cremation is predominant, it is common for close relatives of the deceased to transfer, using special chopsticks, the remaining bones from the ashes to a special jar in which they will be interred. However, in ancient Japanese society, prior to the introduction of Buddhism and the funerary practice of cremation, the corpse was exposed in a manner very similar to the Tibetan sky burial.

==== Pakistan ====
The Kalash people of Pakistan until recently (mid 1980s) practiced above ground burial in large wooden coffins called Bahg'a where the dead were laid with all their best belongings in cemeteries called Madokjal or place of many coffins. This tradition had been dying off with the last being the burial of a shaman in 1985, until the burial in 2016 of Batakeen of Anish village Bumburet.

==== Indonesia ====
The Bali Aga people of Trunyan village on Lake Batur in Bali practice customs found nowhere else on the island. These are the mountain Balinese, and they practice Animistic traditions that predate the arrival of Hinduism in Bali. The burial custom here is for the bodies to be laid on the ground and left to decompose, with a cloth cover or a bamboo cage. Once the decomposition is complete, the bones are placed on a stair shaped altar 500 feet to the north. A large banyan tree known as taru menyan (literally translated as "nice smelling tree") is thought to take away bad smells.

=== Pacific ===
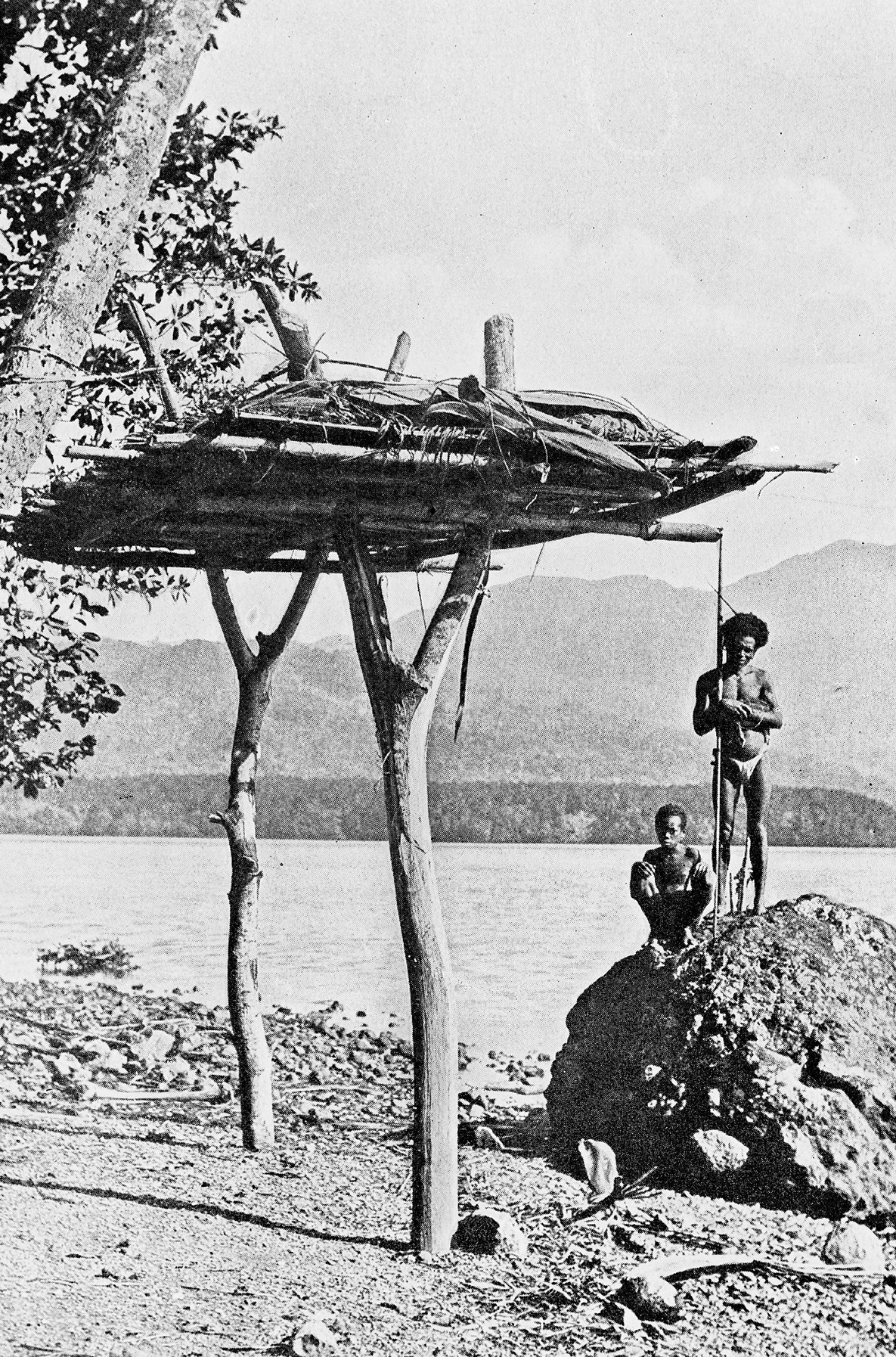
1886 photograph by John William Lindt in British New Guinea, depicting a "platform for dead bodies"

==== Hawaii ====
Pre-contact Hawaiians ritually defleshed the bones of high-ranking nobles (ali'i) so that they could be interred in reliquaries for later veneration. The remains of Captain Cook, who the Hawaiians had believed to be the god Lono, were treated this way after his death.

==== New Zealand ====
The Moriori people of the Chatham Islands placed their dead in a sitting position in the sand dunes looking out to sea; others were strapped to young trees in the forest. In time, the tree grew into and through the bones, making them one.

=== North America ===
==== Great Plains ====
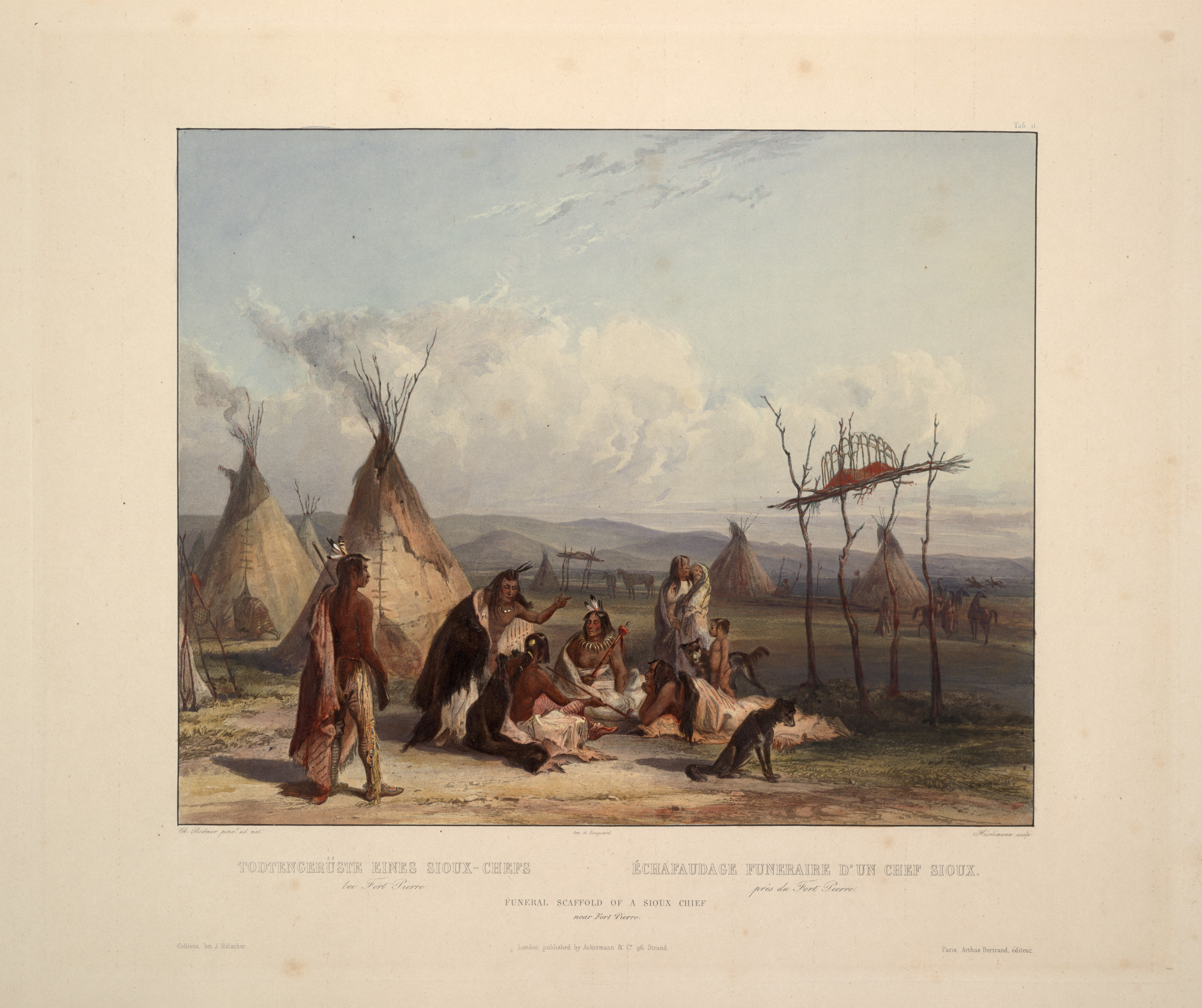
Tree burial of a Sioux chief

Air burials (also known as tree burials) are a form of secondary burial, where a body is placed above ground either in a tree or on scaffolding. After an extended period of time (months to years) the remains are excarnated and buried underground. Air burials were practiced throughout the Great Plains by many different societies, including the Comanche, the Blackfeet, the Sioux, the Dakota, the Cheyenne, the Mandans, and the Crow. Air burials were practiced for both spiritual and practical reasons. Some tribes, like the Sioux and the Lakota, believed that elevating remains would better facilitate a spirit's journey outside of their body. Additionally, elevating remains protected the bodies from being eaten by wolves and allowed a way to manage disease when burial was not possible, like in the winter when the ground was too hard. Lastly, some nomadic groups had specific burial grounds that they only visited once a year. These groups used air burial to care for the dead while waiting to return to their burial grounds.

Due to the temporary nature of air burials and because scaffoldings were made out of perishable materials, like wood, air burials leave behind little archaeological evidence. Thus much of the evidence of air burials come from ethnographic sources. However, some archaeological sites have been discovered where archaeologists believe excarnation occurred as remains were transferred from the primary air burial to their final resting place or to a secondary air burials site. These sites are identifiable by a concentration of smaller bones (like fingers or toes), which would be the bones that would be the easiest to fall off the body, and that would not be noticed by practitioners of excarnation.

After colonization, the U.S. government made air burial illegal, as it conflicted with the nation's Christian ideals. However, in recent years, air burial has been allowed on reservation, leading to a small number of people returning to the practice of air burial.

==== Pacific Northwest ====
Canoe burials were a primary form of burial among the Chinookan-speaking tribes of the Columbia River. Bodies would be wrapped in blankets and placed inside a canoe with personal items. Wealthier families would sometimes top the burial canoe with a second, larger canoe to keep out the rain. The canoe(s) would then be placed in a tree.

In 1830, Chinook chief Comcomly died and was buried via canoe burial at a family burial ground.

=== Europe ===
==== Great Britain and Ireland ====
There is evidence of excarnation in Great Britain and Ireland during the Neolithic, whereby bodies would be left to decompose in an open-air mortuary enclosure, on an excarnation platform, or in a sealed cave, before the bones were deposited elsewhere.

==== Italy ====
Neolithic farmers living in Tavoliere, Italy, over 7000 years ago, practiced ritual defleshing of the dead. Light cut marks suggest that the bones were defleshed up to a year after death. The bones were deposited in Scaloria Cave and, when excavated, were mixed with animal bones, broken pottery and stone tools.

==== Other examples ====
In Europe during the Middle Ages and early modern period, defleshing was a mortuary procedure used mainly to prepare human remains for transport over long distances. The practice was used almost exclusively for nobility. The practice was known as mos teutonicus, or active excarnation. The bodies were broken down differently than solely defleshing, as they were cut up and boiled in either wine, water, or vinegar. The practice involved the removal of skin, muscles, and organs from a body, leaving only the bones. In this procedure, the head, arms, and legs were detached from the body. The process often left telltale cuts on the bones. Pope Boniface VIII banned the practice in a papal bull in 1299.

One notable example of a person who underwent excarnation following death was Christopher Columbus. The American Revolutionary War general, Anthony Wayne, also underwent a form of excarnation.

King Louis IX of France is said to have been defleshed by boiling his corpse until the flesh separated from the bones. This was intended to preserve his bones, to avoid decay of the remains during their return to France from the Eighth Crusade, and to provide relics.

== See also ==
- Natural burial
- Ossuary
