= Scaloria Cave =

Cave in Apulia, Italy

- Grotta Scaloria
- Interactive map of Scaloria Cave
- 41.6403°N 15.9059°E
- Type: Cave
- Periods: Upper Paleolithic, Mesolithic, Neolithic
- Location: Apulia, Italy

Site notes
- Elevation: 45 m (148 ft)
- Height: 2 m (6.6 ft)
- Length: 100 m (330 ft)
- Width: 80 m (260 ft)
- Excavation dates: 1931, 1967, 1978–80
- Archaeologists: Marija Gimbutas, Santo Tinė
- Discovered: 1931
- Owner: State property

Scaloria Cave, also known as Grotta Scaloria, is a cave in the province of Foggia, Apulia between the Tavoliere delle Puglie and the Gargano mountain massif with archaeological evidence of human behavior dating to the Upper Paleolithic. It is 2 km (1 mi) inland, 1 km (1/2 mi) northeast of Manfredonia.

== Description ==
Discovered in 1931 and excavated in 1931, 1967, and 1978–80, the karstic limestone Scaloria Cave is split into a Lower Chamber (Scaloria Bassa) and an Upper Chamber (Scaloria Alta), and sits 45 m (148 ft) above sea level. The Lower Chamber is found after a steep, crawling descent, and had pottery stored in it by Neolithic people. It is accessible by entering the Upper Chamber through the north facing entrance and continuing through the passageway towards the southwest. The Upper Chamber is measured to be 100 m (330 ft) in length, 80 m (260 ft) in width, and 2 m (6.6 ft) high. The usage of Scaloria Cave is largely concentrated in the Neolithic time period between 5500 and 5200 BC, though evidence also shows activity from the Upper Paleolithic and the Mesolithic. Animal bone analysis revealed origins in species extinct by the Neolithic.

=== Lower Chamber ===
Within the Lower Chamber, both stalactites and stalagmites are found, as well as 70 middle Neolithic pottery pieces, some intact, placed on or near cut stalagmites and clustered around a basin carved into the center which was carved in a rectangle and seemed to serve to collect dripping water from stalactites. Specimens of middle Neolithic figulina pottery were found, and the painted style of these vessels was coined "Low Scaloria Style". It consists of painted red bands and of painted bands in the margins with black motifs, and some pottery of this style is found at other sites such as in Abruzzo. Over 40 vessels were found crusted over, as their original function was to collect dripping water from stalactites. The Lower Chamber has access to a pool of water, a small lake that is 3 m (9.8 ft) deep. The potsherds have origins in 1,500 vessels, and were painted with varying motifs such as eggs, snakes, and hourglasses.

=== Upper Chamber ===
Within the Upper Chamber, the remains of at least 22 to 31 people were found, with a high amount of the remains being that of the youth, as a third to a half of the remains were of juvenile individuals. The Upper Chamber was used as a living (as evidenced by hearths with food remains) and herding space (of goat/sheep), and as an area to collect the dead. Burials done in the Upper Chamber were of varying styles, including highly fragmented and gathered remains, burial without the cranium, burial with just the cranium on a stone, single burial without goods, and single burial with goods. The last two types are dated to be more recent (5322–5017 BC and the end of the sixth millennium BC respectively) and align with trends of the time period toward single burials with goods, while the first three types are found across southern Italian Neolithic sites. Aside from burials in Trenches 2 and 6, remains were found to be disarticulated. There are 10 separate trenches, with Trenches 11 and 12 dug to extend trenches 5 and 8 respectively. The trenches were dug in 10 centimetres (3.94 in) layers at a time for excavating, with different trenches having varying percentages of tools, pottery, and remains. Human remains were found mixed in with pottery, tools, and animal remains. After the Neolithic, the site was covered with a calcareous sheet. Some remains were exposed to fire in varying degrees, and fragmentation of remains are believed to have occurred within the first year of the individuals' death, around the time of or during deposition. Cut marks on remains were found to be in small pairs, suggesting a repeated motion at once without the use of high-force or high-impact tools such as anvils. On post-cranial body parts, crosswise marks in groups of five were nearly consistent across remains, largely concentrated around areas such as joints, and the technique seems consistent with the work of a person attempting to strip flesh in a downwards motion from the bone shaft. On the cranium itself, there were markings found inside skulls, which would mean the brain would have been removed. The cuts on the cranium seem consistent with attempting to take the tissue and flesh from the bone. The tools themselves were found to largely be flint blades and flakes sourced from the northeast coast mines of Gargano; this source is at a distance from the site itself and has given insight into the groups the people who used the Scaloria Cave would have had to have interacted with to obtain these tools. Additionally, stone axes were found in Trenches 1 and 2, and a grindstone was found in Trench 5. There was also an obsidian blade found in Trench 10, a material rare in the area, as well as bone tools, marine shells (Trenches 5, 6, and 9), and land snail shells (Trench 8). The style of pottery found in the Upper Chamber was termed "High Scaloria Style" by Tinė, and consists of painted red bands with black borders and chevron motifs. The defleshing has been called the first well-documented case of early Europeans doing as such. Burials were done over a period of 600 years, as noted in the latest 1978–80 excavations done by Marija Gimbutas and Santo Tinė in a joint effort between UCLA and University of Genoa, their respective universities. In 1990, about ten volunteers worked under the direction of Gimbutas to create illustrations, study, and photography of what had been excavated, though she passed before completion. The area was dubbed a necropolis due to copious burials. The Upper Chamber is connected to the nearby Grotta di Occhipinto, whose opening is located 200 m (660 ft) southeast to the Scaloria opening. Occhipinto cave is accessible by continuing through the Upper Chamber to the narrow passage going southeast.

=== 21st century research ===
In more recent times, the use of pseudo-3D electrical resistivity tomography, two-dimensional and three-dimensional synthetic data models, and bedrock drilling in 2014 by the Istituto Italiano di Archeologia Sperimentale have revealed cavities nearby the site which have not yet been explored. Academic work also continues in the modern day, including a $40,000 grant in 2008 from the National Endowment for the Humanities to a UCLA project under the direction of Ernestine Elster for a technical and interpretive publication on the cave. Micro-morphological studies on exposed deposits of the cave have been conducted as recently as 2018 through the University of Cambridge, Istituto Italiano per l'Archeologia Sperimentale-Genova, and Museo di Archeologia Ligure Genova.

== Dating ==
Systematic isotopic analysis was done by taking the stable carbon isotope and stable nitrogen isotope levels and taking the ratio. This showed the collagen quality of the human and animal remains, and revealed that the humans maintained a terrestrial diet in which they ate animal proteins, unlike other sites which revealed occupants who had marine influenced diets. Collagen dating was done by the Oxford Radiation Laboratory, and in the 1980s dating was done by the La Jolla Laboratory from charcoal samples. Radiocarbon dating on carbon remains in the hearths two dates within the Upper Paleolithic (11,040 +/- 190 B.P. and 10,790 +/- 210 B.P.) and two from the Mesolithic (9560 +/- 140 B.P. and 9030 +/- 120 B.P.). Radio carbon dating at the site dated ~9,000 to ~8,000 B.C. also revealed the disappearance of the wild horse and its replacement with Asinus hydruntinus, the remains of which made up 53.7% of the faunal assemblage found at the site. Strontium isotope analysis was also done on the remains in Scaloria Cave in an effort to extract information from the dental enamel on the origin of the remains and how close their relationship is to the cave itself. The greater range at the cave suggested that the cave was used ritualistically by people not of the area, suggesting a funerary site.

== Proposed significance ==
Due to the continual use of the Upper Chamber as a burial site, and the lack of violence upon the remains prior to burial, it can be assumed that the disposal of remains in this way are not consistent with mass graves or cannibalism. The activity of the living upon the remains of the dead are proposed to be that of people who were attempting to ritualistically take the deceased from the realm of the living to that of the dead. Hypotheses were also made that perhaps remains were buried in the cave due to the visual similarity of bones and stalactites, or beliefs regarding the underground as a source of spiritual power. Cult behavior has also been suggested, potentially in reverence to the water, perhaps as a plea for rain in the face of a climate crisis. In short, the excarnation was a part of a multi-stage burial process, as was the mixing of the fragments into the other materials to possibly symbolize the passage into death, though some do note the possibility of the consumption of the flesh.
