= Third Crusade =

1189–1192 attempted re-conquest of the Holy Land

- Part of the Crusades and Byzantine–Seljuk wars
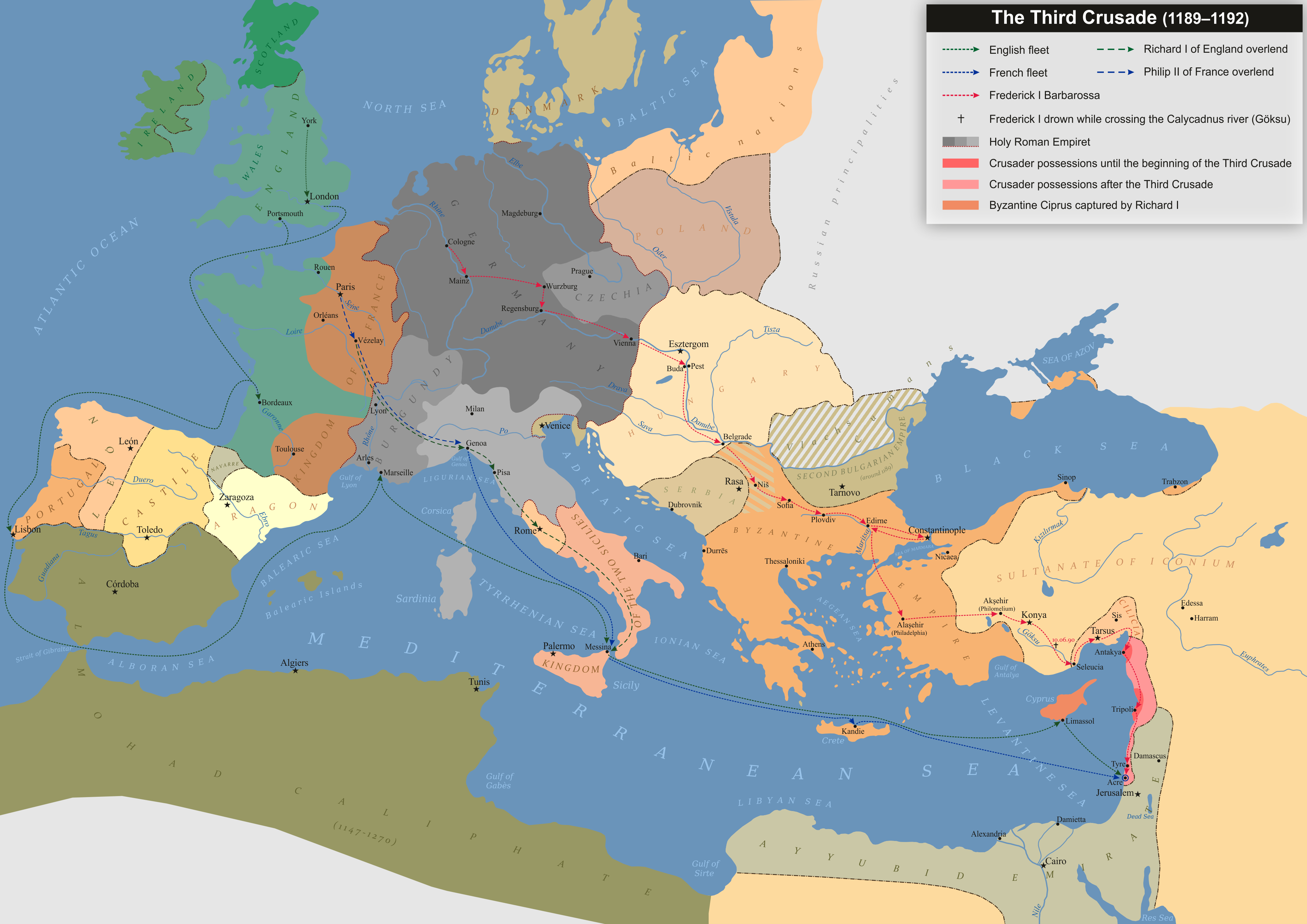
- Routes taken by the Crusader armies
| Date | 11 May 1189 – 2 September 1192 |
| Location | Levant, Sicily, Iberia, Balkans and Anatolia |
| Result | See § Outcome |

Belligerents
| Angevin Empire; Kingdom of France; Holy Roman Empire; Kingdom of Hungary; Republic of Genoa; Kingdom of Navarre; Republic of Pisa; Kingdom of Jerusalem; Principality of Antioch; Knights Templar; Knights Hospitaller; Teutonic Order; Kingdom of Portugal; Kingdom of Silves | Ayyubid Sultanate; Seljuk Sultanate of Rum; Nizari Ismaili state (the Order of Assassins); Byzantine Empire; Cyprus |

Commanders and leaders
| Richard I of England; Philip II of France; Sancho I of Portugal; Frederick Barbarossa †; Géza of Hungary #; Guy of Lusignan; Conrad of Montferrat X; Leo I, King of Armenia | Saladin; Isaac II Angelos |

Strength
| 36,000–74,000 total (estimate): 8,000–9,000 Angevin (English, Normans, Aquitanians, Welsh, Navarrese, etc.) troops with Richard I, up to 17,000 or 50,000 according to some sources including non-combatants and sailors; 7,000+ French with Phillip II (inc. 650 knights and 1,300 squires); 12,000–20,000 Germans with Frederick I (inc. 3–4,000 knights); 2,000 Hungarians with Géza; Two additional contingents also joined Frederick's army while travelling through Byzantine Empire. Numbered about 1,000 men.: From 7,000 to 40,000 from the rest of Europe and Outremer, plus some Turcopoles; Or 300,000 crusaders | Ayyubids: 40,000 (Saladin's field army, 1189 – estimate); 5,000–20,000 (Acre's garrison, 1189); Seljuks: 22,000+ (Qutb al-Din's field army only, 1190) |

Casualties and losses
| 50,000+ Frankish losses (muslim estimate) (Note: It is difficult to reach precise conclusions on the military losses involved. The Muslims might console themselves by placing the losses of the Franks at not less than 50,000.) | Unknown |
- Crusader casualties were greater than Muslim ones (Note: It is clear that the losses among the Crusading forces from pestilence and famine were far greater than among the Muslims, and may have outnumbered their losses in battle.)

The Third Crusade (1189–1192) was an attempt led by King Philip II of France, King Richard I of England, and Emperor Frederick Barbarossa to reconquer the Holy Land following the capture of Jerusalem by the Ayyubid sultan Saladin in 1187. For this reason, the Third Crusade is also known as the Kings' Crusade.

The Crusade was partially successful. It recaptured the important cities of Acre and Jaffa, as well as successfully reversing most of Saladin's conquests (primarily in the Kingdom of Jerusalem), but failed in the ultimate goal to conquer Jerusalem (the major aim of the Crusade and its religious focus).

After the failure of the Second Crusade of 1147–1149, the Zengid dynasty controlled a unified Syria and engaged in a conflict with the Fatimid rulers of Egypt. Saladin ultimately brought both the Egyptian and Syrian forces under his own control, and employed them to reduce the Crusader states and to recapture Jerusalem in 1187. Spurred by religious zeal, King Henry II of England and King Philip II of France (later known as "Philip Augustus") ended their conflict with each other to lead a new crusade. The death of Henry (6 July 1189), however, meant the English contingent came under the command of his successor, King Richard I of England. The German Emperor Frederick Barbarossa, now in his mid-60s, also responded to the call to arms, leading an army across the Balkans and Anatolia. He achieved some victories against the Seljuk Sultanate of Rûm, but he died whilst crossing a river on 10 June 1190 before reaching the Holy Land. His death caused tremendous grief among the German Crusaders, and most of his troops returned home.

After the Crusaders had driven the Ayyubid army from Acre, Philip—in company with Frederick's successor in command of the German crusaders, Leopold V, Duke of Austria—left the Holy Land in August 1191. Following a major victory by the Crusaders at the Battle of Arsuf, most of the coastline of the Levant was returned to Christian control. On 2 September 1192 Richard and Saladin finalized the Treaty of Jaffa, which recognized Muslim control over Jerusalem but allowed unarmed Christian pilgrims and merchants to visit the city. Richard departed the Holy Land on 9 October 1192 due to mounting threats to his rule back in Europe. The military successes of the Third Crusade allowed the Christians to maintain considerable states in Cyprus and on the Syrian coast, restoring the Kingdom of Jerusalem on a narrow strip from Tyre to Jaffa.

The failure to re-capture Jerusalem inspired the subsequent Fourth Crusade of 1202–1204, but Europeans would only regain the city—and only briefly—in the Sixth Crusade in 1229.

== Background ==
The Near East, c. 1190, at the inception of the Third Crusade

=== Second Crusade ===
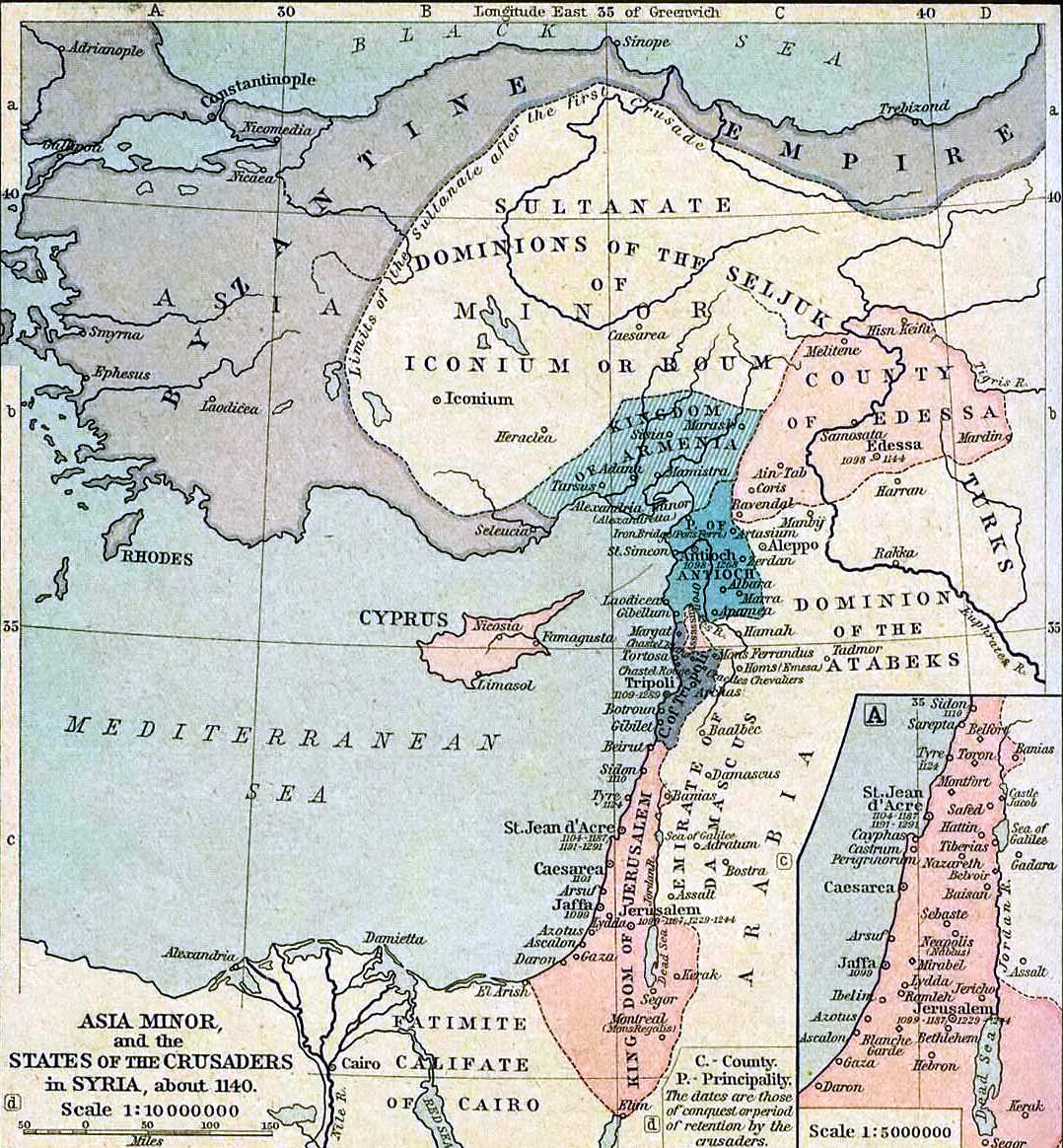
The Near East around 1140, a few years before the Second Crusade

The fall of Edessa, an important city held by the crusaders from 1098 to 1144, deeply shook Europe, which until then had observed the events unfolding in the Near East during the first half of the 12th century with relative passivity. The aggressive and astute policy adopted by the atābeg Zengi, the founder of the Zengid dynasty, had enabled the unification of the regions of Aleppo and Mosul under a single domain. Zengi’s immediate successor was his son Nur al-Din (Nūr ad-Din), who established himself in Aleppo and immediately focused on continuing the holy war against the Christians of Outremer.

It was on these premises and the intense preaching activity of several church figures, most notably Bernard of Clairvaux, that Pope Eugene III proclaimed the Second Crusade. Despite the involvement of the two most powerful European sovereigns of the first half of the 12th century, namely Louis VII of France and Conrad III of Germany, a series of issues compromised the expedition's outcome. These included the lack of cohesion between Germans and French, the journey to the destination, during which a large number of soldiers died, and the decision to attack Damascus, the only city that intended to maintain peaceful relations with the crusaders due to its fear of Nur al-Din’s expansionist tendencies in Syria.At the end of a brief five-day siege, the largest Frankish (Note: The Arabs referred to Western Europeans collectively as Franks Ifranj.) army ever to arrive in the Near East withdrew from Damascus without achieving any concrete results.

=== Unification of Syria ===
The defeat of the crusaders and disputes in the Christian world allowed Nur al-Din to unify Syria and reduce the Crusader states' size. With Turkoman and Kurdish troops, he achieved victories like Inab in 1149, conquering the Orontes Valley, dissolving the County of Edessa (1151), securing Damascus (1154), and nearly destroying the Principality of Antioch.The crusaders, led by Baldwin III, captured Ascalon in 1153. Raids in 1156 were halted by an earthquake, and Nur al-Din's attacks on Baniyas in 1157 failed. The 1160s were marked by the increasing diplomatic isolation of the Crusader states. While Byzantium sought reconciliation with Nur ad-Din at times, he consolidated his power in the Muslim hinterland. Significant personnel changes took place with the capture of Reynald of Châtillon and the death of Baldwin III

Both the rulers of the Crusader states and the leaders of Muslim polities sought to expand their power and influence, particularly over Egypt. The Fatimid dynasty, weakened by internal conflict, became the target of both Nur al-Din, and Amalric I of Jerusalem. Efforts to gain control over Egypt led to a series of military campaigns and shifting alliances. Amalric’s attempt to invade Egypt in 1163 was unsuccessful, largely due to seasonal flooding. Meanwhile, political instability in Egypt continued as the vizier Shawar, after being deposed, sought military assistance from Nur al-Din.

At the same time, Nur al-Din attempted to attack Crusader positions in Syria but faced resistance from Western European nobles returning from pilgrimage. Nur al-Din sent his general Shirkuh, accompanied by Saladin, to Egypt, where they briefly restored Shawar to power. However, Shawar soon allied with Amalric against Shirkuh. This led to further intervention by Nur al-Din, who sought to exert more influence over the region. In Antioch, Nur al-Din captured several prominent leaders, but refrained from a full assault to avoid confrontation with the Byzantine Empire. Temporary agreements saw both Shirkuh and Amalric withdraw from Egypt, but the contest for control continued. Shirkuh returned to Egypt in 1167, but was blocked by the combined forces of Amalric and Shawar. Negotiations led to another withdrawal. In 1168, Amalric launched another attack on Egypt, but was repulsed again.

=== Rise of Saladin and the crisis ===
Shawar was sentenced to death for his alliance with the crusaders, and Shirkuh succeeded him as vizier of Egypt but died in 1169 after a few weeks due to indigestion. Saladin, his nephew, became vizier at thirty-one, a compromise candidate. Nur al-Din later regretted this, fearing Saladin’s ambitions after successes in Egypt and Yemen. When Nur al-Din died in 1174, he left his empire to his eleven-year-old son As-Salih Ismail al-Malik. Saladin, invited by Ibn al-Muqaddam, entered Damascus as the young emir’s guardian, defeating the Zengids at the Battle of the Horns of Hama in 1175, securing supremacy over Syria except Aleppo.

Amalric I had died, like Nur al-Din, in 1174, leaving the throne of Jerusalem to his nearly thirteen-year-old son Baldwin IV, who was afflicted with leprosy. The Franks, divided between peace and war factions, launched expeditions against Egypt from 1175 to 1178. Reynald of Châtillon, freed in 1181, attacked caravans, giving Saladin his casus belli for his offensive against the Franks.

Saladin invaded the region, prompting both sides to gather all available troops. On 3 and 4 July 1187, the Crusader army suffered a major defeat on the hills of Hattin near Lake Galilee. The relic of the True Cross was lost, the king was captured, and many soldiers were either killed or taken prisoner. Most Templars who survived the battle were executed, and Saladin personally killed Reynald of Chatillon. In the months that followed, Saladin gained control over most of the region. Acre was quickly taken, and Jerusalem surrendered in October. By the end of 1187, the Crusader presence had been reduced to the city of Tyre.

=== Preparations for the Third Crusade ===
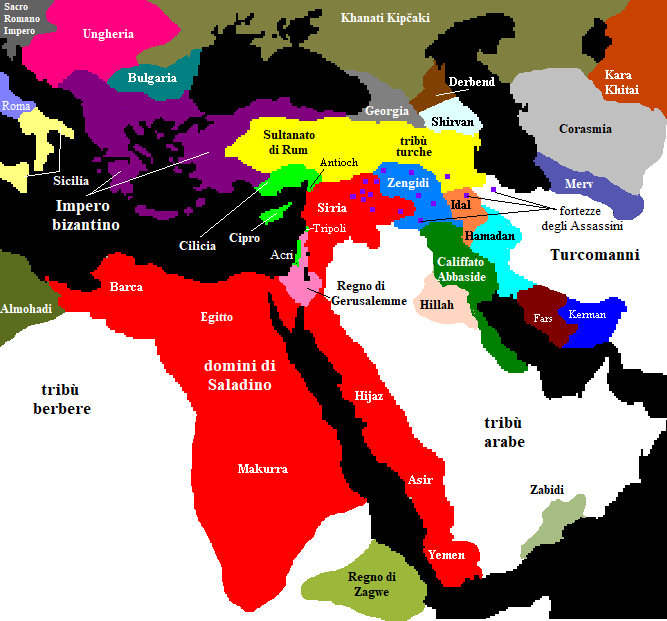
The Near East and Middle East around 1190. Saladin's empire and its vassals in red, with the territories taken from the Crusader states between 1187 and 1189 in pink. Light green indicates the crusader territories that survived Saladin’s death.

News of the catastrophe reached the west in the early autumn of 1187. Pope Urban III died of stroke on 20 October 1187, upon hearing of these events. Within ten days the new pope, Gregory VIII, was sending out the proclamation of a new crusade.

Therefore, it is incumbent upon all to both consider and choose to amend our sins with voluntary chastisement and, through repentance and acts of piety, to turn to the Lord our God. We must first correct the evil we have done within ourselves, and then attend to the filth and malice of our enemies ... Therefore, think, my children, how you came into this world and how you will depart from it, how all things pass away and you also will pass away, and receive the time for repentance and for doing good, as far as it is up to you, with gratitude ... For perhaps He willed to try and come to the knowledge of others, if there is any one who is intelligent or seeking the Lord, who joyfully embraces the time of repentance offered to him and, laying down his life for his brothers, will be consumed in a short time and fulfill many ages, having heard the awesome things.

The new pontiff, Gregory VIII, declared that the fall of Jerusalem was to be considered God's punishment for the sins. It was thus decided to prepare for a new crusade: Henry II of England and Philip II of France ended the war that had pitted them against each other, and both imposed the so-called Saladin tithe, "a ten percent tax on income and movable goods", to finance the expedition. At Gisors, on January 22, 1188, King Philip Augustus of France and King Henry II of England temporarily resolved their differences and decided to embark on the crusade.

Along with the emperor of the Holy Roman Empire, and the kings of France and England, there were also numerous other groups of European fighters who went to the Holy Land hoping to recapture Jerusalem. For instance, the Pisans, led by their archbishop Ubaldo Lanfranchi, were joined in the late summer of 1189 by the Genoese and Venetians. Over the summer, various French and Burgundians arrived, including, for example, Theobald V of Blois and his brother Stephen I of Sancerre. On 1 September, a large fleet carrying various Frisians and Danes (estimated, likely exaggeratedly, at around 500) landed.

A small fleet of London fighters also left the Thames in August and reached Portugal a month later. On 2 September, a baron of Hainaut, James of Avesnes, arrived overseas with some Flemings; "a soldier of great renown", he became one of the crusade’s commanders. The Bretons then completed their journey, and shortly afterward, in mid-September, various French barons appeared. On the 24th, the Archbishop of Ravenna Gerard and the Landgrave of Thuringia Louis III arrived, the latter succeeding James of Avesnes as the crusade’s leader. On September 29, the Londoners who had helped conquer Silves continued their journey through the Strait of Gibraltar and arrived at their destination some time later. The last to complete their journey were other Danes, accompanied by an unspecified nephew of King Canute VI. Arrivals ceased during the winter but resumed in the spring of 1190. Count Henry II of Champagne, leading a large contingent composed of most of the forces of the French king Philip Augustus, arrived on 27 July and immediately took command.

== Barbarossa's crusade ==
The crusade of Frederick Barbarossa, Holy Roman Emperor, was "the most meticulously planned and organized" yet. Frederick was sixty-six years old when he set out. Two accounts dedicated to his expedition survive: the History of the Expedition of the Emperor Frederick and the History of the Pilgrims. There is also a short tract, the Letter on the Death of the Emperor Frederick.

=== Taking the cross ===
On 27 October 1187, just over three weeks after Saladin's capture of Jerusalem, Pope Gregory VIII sent letters to the German episcopate announcing his election and ordering them to win the German nobility over to a new crusade. Around 23 November, Frederick received letters that had been sent to him from the rulers of the Crusader states in the East urging him to come to their aid. By 11 November, Cardinal Henry of Marcy had been appointed to preach the crusade in Germany. He preached before Frederick and a public assembly in Strasbourg around 1 December, as did Bishop Henry of Strasbourg.

About 500 knights took the cross at Strasbourg, but Frederick demurred on the grounds of his ongoing conflict with Archbishop Philip of Cologne. He did, however, send envoys to Philip of France (at the time his ally) to urge him to take the cross. On 25 December, Frederick and Philip met in person on the border between Ivois and Mouzon in the presence of Henry of Marcy and Joscius, Archbishop of Tyre, but he could not convince Philip to go on a crusade because he was at war with England. Frederick held a diet in Mainz on 27 March 1188. Because of its purpose, he named the diet the "Court of Christ". The archbishop of Cologne submitted to Frederick and peace was restored to the empire. Bishop Godfrey of Würzburg preached a crusade sermon and Frederick, at the urging of the assembly, took the cross. He was followed by his son, Duke Frederick VI of Swabia, (Note: Frederick's eldest son, Henry VI, who had already been elected king of the Romans, was to remain behind as regent. On 10 April 1189, Frederick wrote to Pope Clement III asking for a postponement of Henry's planned coronation as co-emperor because he did not want Henry to leave Germany during the regency. Frederick formally appointed his son as regent at Regensburg on the eve of his departure.) and by Duke Frederick of Bohemia, (Note: The duke of Bohemia died before the crusade began.) Duke Leopold V of Austria, Landgrave Louis III of Thuringia (Note: Both Leopold V and Louis III sailed with their armies from Italy rather than march overland with Frederick. Leopold was delayed by a border dispute with Hungary.) and a host of lesser nobles. After taking the cross, Frederick proclaimed a "general expedition against the pagans" in accordance with the pope's instructions. He set the period of preparation as 17 April 1188 to 8 April 1189 and scheduled the army to assemble at Regensburg on Saint George's Day (23 April 1189). To prevent the crusade from degenerating into an undisciplined mob, participants were required to have at least three marks, which was enough to be able support oneself for two years.

=== Protecting the Jews ===
At Strasbourg, Frederick imposed a small tax on the Jews of Germany to fund the crusade. He also put the Jews under his protection and forbade anyone to preach against the Jews. The First and Second Crusades in Germany had been marred by violence against the Jews. The Third Crusade itself occasioned an outbreak of violence against the Jews in England. Frederick successfully prevented a repetition of those events inside Germany.

On 29 January 1188, a mob invaded the Jewish quarter in Mainz and many Jews fled to the imperial castle of Münzenberg. There were further incidents connected with the "Court of Christ" in March. According to Rabbi Moses ha-Cohen of Mainz, (Note: Moses's account is known from a letter he wrote to his brother-in-law, Eleazar of Worms.) there were minor incidents from the moment people began arriving for the Court of Christ on 9 March. This culminated in a mob gathering to invade the Jewish quarter on 26 March. It was dispersed by the imperial marshal Henry of Kalden. The rabbi then met with the emperor, which resulted in an imperial edict threatening maiming or death for anyone who maimed or killed a Jew. On 29 March, Frederick and the rabbi then rode through the streets together to emphasise that the Jews had imperial protection. Those Jews who had fled in January returned at the end of April.

=== Diplomatic preparations ===
Shortly after the Strasbourg assembly, Frederick dispatched legates to negotiate the passage of his army through their lands: Archbishop Conrad of Mainz to Hungary, Godfrey of Wiesenbach to the Seljuk sultanate of Rûm and an unnamed ambassador to the Byzantine Empire. He may also have sent representatives to Prince Leo II of Armenia.

Because Frederick had signed a treaty of friendship with Saladin in 1175, he felt it necessary to give Saladin notice of the termination of their alliance. (Note: There is a published correspondence, almost certainly forged, between Frederick and Saladin concerning the end of their friendship.) On 26 May 1188, he sent Count Henry II of Dietz to present an ultimatum to Saladin. The sultan was ordered to withdraw from the lands he had conquered, to return the True Cross to the Church of the Holy Sepulchre and to make satisfaction for those Christians who had been killed in his conquests, otherwise Frederick would abrogate their treaty.

A few days after Christmas 1188, Frederick received Hungarian, Byzantine, Serbian, Seljuk and possibly Ayyubid envoys in Nuremberg. The Hungarians and Seljuks promised provisions and safe-conduct to the crusaders. The envoys of Stefan Nemanja, grand prince of Serbia, announced that their prince would receive Frederick in Niš. An agreement was reached with the Byzantine envoy, John Kamateros, but it required Godfrey of Würzburg, Frederick of Swabia and Leopold of Austria to swear oaths for the crusaders' good behaviour. Bishop Hermann of Münster, Count Rupert III of Nassau, the future Henry III of Dietz and the imperial chamberlain Markward von Neuenburg with a large entourage (Note: Sources give their entourage as 100, 300 or 500 knights.) were sent ahead to make preparations in Byzantium.

=== Mustering an army ===
At the Strasbourg assembly in December 1187, Bishop Godfrey of Würzburg urged Frederick to sail his army to the Holy Land rather than proceed overland. Frederick declined (Note: The emperor had been on the Second Crusade in 1147 and so was familiar with the overland route.) and Pope Clement III even ordered Godfrey not to discuss it further. Ultimately, many Germans ignored the rendezvous at Regensburg and went to the Kingdom of Sicily, hoping to sail to the Holy Land on their own. Frederick wrote to King William II of Sicily asking him to bar such sailings. The emperor and the pope may have feared that Saladin would soon seize all the crusader ports.

Frederick was the first of the three kings to set out for the Holy Land. On 15 April 1189 in Haguenau, (Note: This place may have had personal significance for Frederick. It was the closest place Frederick, an itinerant king, had to a home and may also have been where he was born.) Frederick formally and symbolically accepted the staff and scrip of a pilgrim. He arrived in Regensburg for the muster between 7 and 11 May. The army had begun to gather on 1 May. Frederick was disappointed by the small force awaiting him, but he was dissuaded from calling off the enterprise when he learned that an international force had already advanced to the Hungarian border and was waiting for the imperial army.

Frederick set out on 11 May 1189 with an army of 12,000–26,000 men, (Note: McLynn estimates that roughly 25,000 soldiers joined, but suggests the amount could have been somewhat to substantially more including 2,000–4,000 knights.) Contemporary chroniclers gave a range of estimates for Frederick's army, from 10,000 to 600,000 men, (Note: Christian estimates of the size of Frederick's army vary from 13,000 to 100,000, while Muslim sources wildly exaggerate its size from 200,000 to 300,000.) including 4,000–20,000 knights. After leaving Germany, Frederick's army was increased by the addition of a contingent of 2,000 men led by the Hungarian prince Géza, the younger brother of the King Béla III of Hungary, and Bishop Ugrin Csák. Two contingents from the Empire, from Burgundy and Lorraine, also joined the army during its transit of Byzantium. The army that Frederick led into Muslim territory was probably larger than the one with which he had left Germany.

=== Passage through the Balkans ===
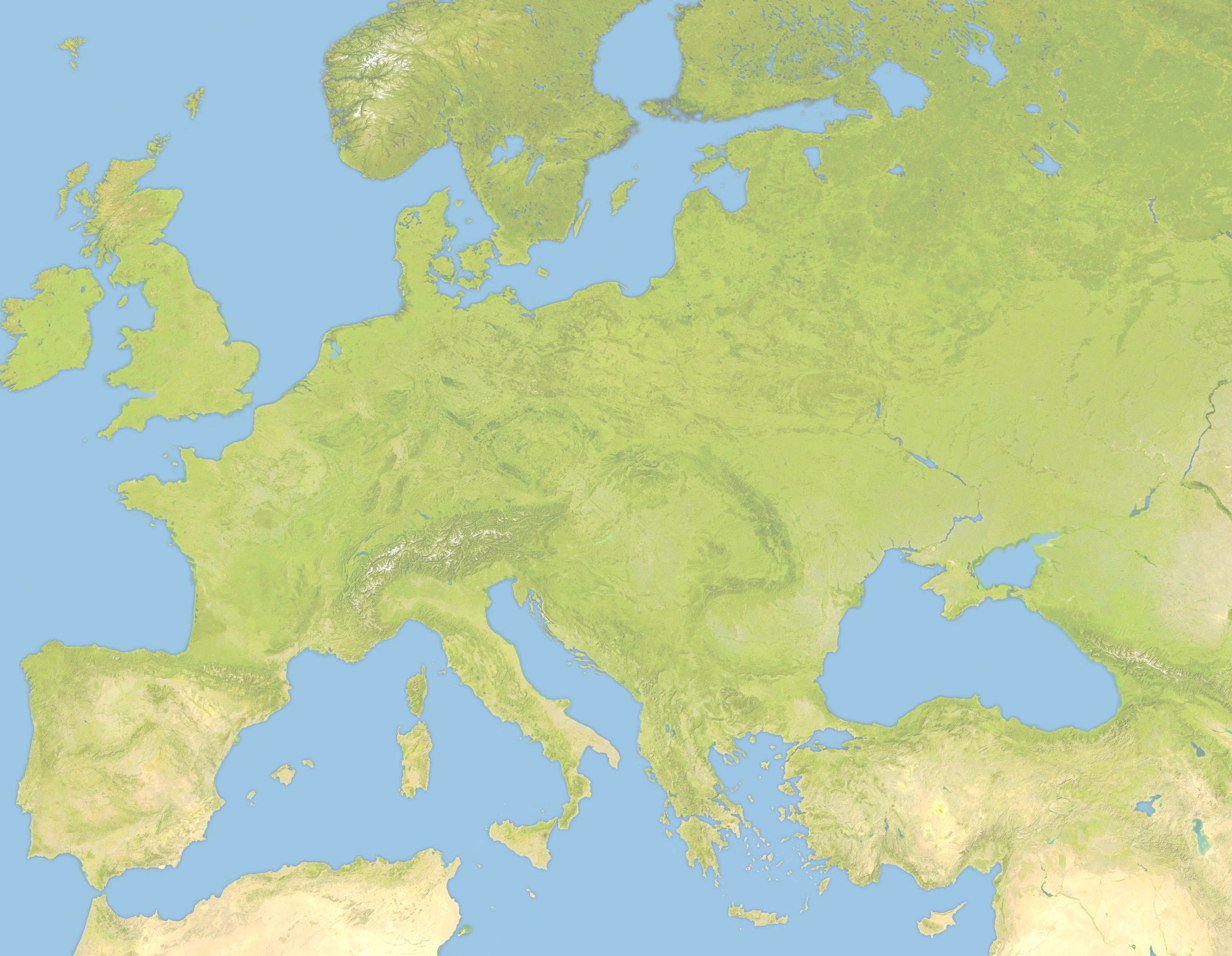
Key stops along the route of Barbarossa's crusade from his taking the cross to his death

==== Hungary ====
Frederick sailed from Regensburg on 11 May 1189, but most of the army had left earlier by land for the Hungarian border. On 16 May, Frederick ordered the village of Mauthausen burned because it had levied a toll on the army. In Vienna, Frederick expelled 500 men from the army for various infractions. He celebrated Pentecost on 28 May encamped across from Hungarian Pressburg. During his four days encamped before Pressburg, Frederick issued an ordinance for the good behaviour of the army, a "law against malefactors" in words of one chronicle. It apparently had a good effect.

From Pressburg, the Hungarian envoys escorted the crusaders to Esztergom, where King Béla III of Hungary greeted them on 4 June. He provided boats, wine, bread and barley to the army. Frederick stayed in Esztergom for four days. The king of Hungary accompanied the army to the Byzantine border at Belgrade. There were incidents during the crossing of the Drava and Tisza rivers, but the Sava was crossed on 28 June without incident. In Belgrade, Frederick staged a tournament, held a court, conducted a census of the army and wrote to the Byzantine emperor Isaac II to inform him that he had entered Byzantine territory.

==== Byzantine Empire ====
The army, still accompanied by Béla III, left Belgrade on 1 July, crossed the Morava and headed for Braničevo, which was the seat of the local Byzantine administration since Belgrade had been devastated in the Byzantine–Hungarian War (1180–1185) with the Hungarians and Serbs. The head of the Byzantine administration was a doux (duke). At Braničevo, Béla III took leave and returned to Hungary. He gave the crusaders wagons and in return Frederick gave him his boats, since they would no longer be travelling up the Danube.

The Burgundian contingent under Archbishop Aimo II of Tarentaise and a contingent from Metz caught up with the army at Braničevo. The duke of Braničevo gave the army eight days' worth of provisions. The enlarged army, including a Hungarian contingent, left Braničevo on 11 July following the Via Militaris that led to Constantinople. They were harassed by bandits along the route. According to crusader sources, some captured bandits confessed that they were acting on the orders of the duke of Braničevo.

On 25 July, Frederick was in Ćuprija when he received word that Peter of Brixey had arrived in Hungary with the contingent from Lorraine. It was there that the problems of communication between Frederick and Isaac became apparent. Frederick's envoys had reached Constantinople, but Isaac was away besieging rebels in Philadelphia under a pretender named Theodore Mangaphas. Nonetheless, John Kamateros wrote to inform Frederick that a market would be available in Sofia. It was probably from Ćuprija that Frederick sent another envoy, a Hungarian count named Lectoforus, to Constantinople to see what was going on.

Frederick was welcomed by Grand Prince Stefan Nemanja in Niš with pomp on 27 July. Although the Serbian ruler asked the emperor to invest him with his domains, Frederick refused on the grounds that he was on a pilgrimage and did not wish to harm Isaac as the Serbians rebelled against the Byzantines earlier. A marriage alliance was arranged between a daughter of Duke Berthold of Merania and a nephew of Nemanja, Toljen. Frederick also received messages of support from Tsar Peter II of Bulgaria, but refused an outright alliance. Despite Frederick's care not to be drawn into Balkan politics, the events at Niš were regarded by the Byzantines as hostile acts.

Before leaving Niš, Frederick had Godfrey of Würzburg preach a sermon on the importance of discipline and maintaining the peace. He also reorganized the army, dividing it into four, because it would be entering territory more firmly under Byzantine control and less friendly. The vanguard of Swabians and Bavarians was put under the command of the Duke of Swabia assisted by Herman IV of Baden and Berthold III of Vohburg. The second division consisted of the Hungarian and Bohemian contingents with their separate standard-bearers. The third was under the command of the Duke of Merania assisted by Bishop Diepold of Passau. The fourth was under Frederick's personal command and Rupert of Nassau was named its standard-bearer in absentia.

The crusaders left Niš on 30 July and arrived in Sofia on 13 August. They found the city practically abandoned. There was no Byzantine delegation to meet them and no market. The following day the crusaders left Sofia and the Lorrainers under Peter of Brixey finally caught up with the main army. The Gate of Trajan was held by a Byzantine force of 500 men. According to Diepold of Passau, the garrison retreated at the sight of Frederick's scouts, but the History of the Expedition says that it retreated only after being engaged by Frederick and a small group of knights. The army arrived at Pazardzhik on 20 August, finding an abundance of supplies.

=== Conflict with Byzantium ===
Lectoforus met the army at Pazardzhik and informed Frederick of the disrespect shown to his envoys. On 24 August, the imperial army reached Philippopolis, the Byzantine forces in the area having fled at their approach. On 25 August, Lectoforus' report was confirmed: Hermann of Münster, Rupert of Nassau, Henry of Dietz and Markward von Neuenburg had been stripped of their possessions and openly mocked in presence of the Ayyubid ambassador. That same day, a Byzantine envoy, James of Pisa, arrived with a letter from Isaac, who referred to Frederick as "king of Germany", refusing him the imperial title, and accused him of plotting to put his son Frederick on the throne of Constantinople. He nonetheless offered to fulfill the agreement of December 1188 to ferry the crusaders across the Dardanelles if he received hostages (including Duke Frederick and six bishops) in addition to the envoys he had arrested. Frederick's response that he would consider the offer only after the envoys were released.

According to the History of the Expedition, the receipt of Isaac's letter marked a break in crusader–Byzantine relations. Thereafter, the crusaders resorted to plunder and a scorched earth policy. On 26 August, the crusaders seized Philippopolis and its plentiful supplies. Frederick tried to communicate with the nearest Byzantine commander, the protostrator Manuel Kamytzes. When he received no response, he attacked his army on 29 August, killing fifty. The following day (30 August) or a week later (6 September), Duke Frederick and Duke Berthold occupied Berrhoe unopposed. Henry of Kalden occupied a castle called Scribention, while Bishop Diepold and Duke Berthold took a further two towns and ten castles. At this point, the local Armenian and Bulgarian population swore oaths to Frederick to supply the market in Philippopolis as long as the crusaders stayed. They remained there and in partial occupation of Macedonia until 5 November.

Isaac ordered Kamytzes to shadow the crusaders and harass their foraging parties. About 22 November 1189, with some 2,000 horsemen, Kamytzes set up an ambush for the crusaders' supply train near Philippopolis. The crusaders were informed of this from the Armenian inhabitants of the fortress of Prousenos, where Kamytzes had set up his main camp. They set out with 5,000 cavalry to attack the Byzantine camp. The two forces met by accident near Prousenos, and in the ensuing battle, Kamytzes was routed. The historian Niketas Choniates, who was an eyewitness, writes that the Byzantines fled as far as Ohrid, and that Kamytzes did not rejoin his men until three days after the battle.

=== Turkish territory ===
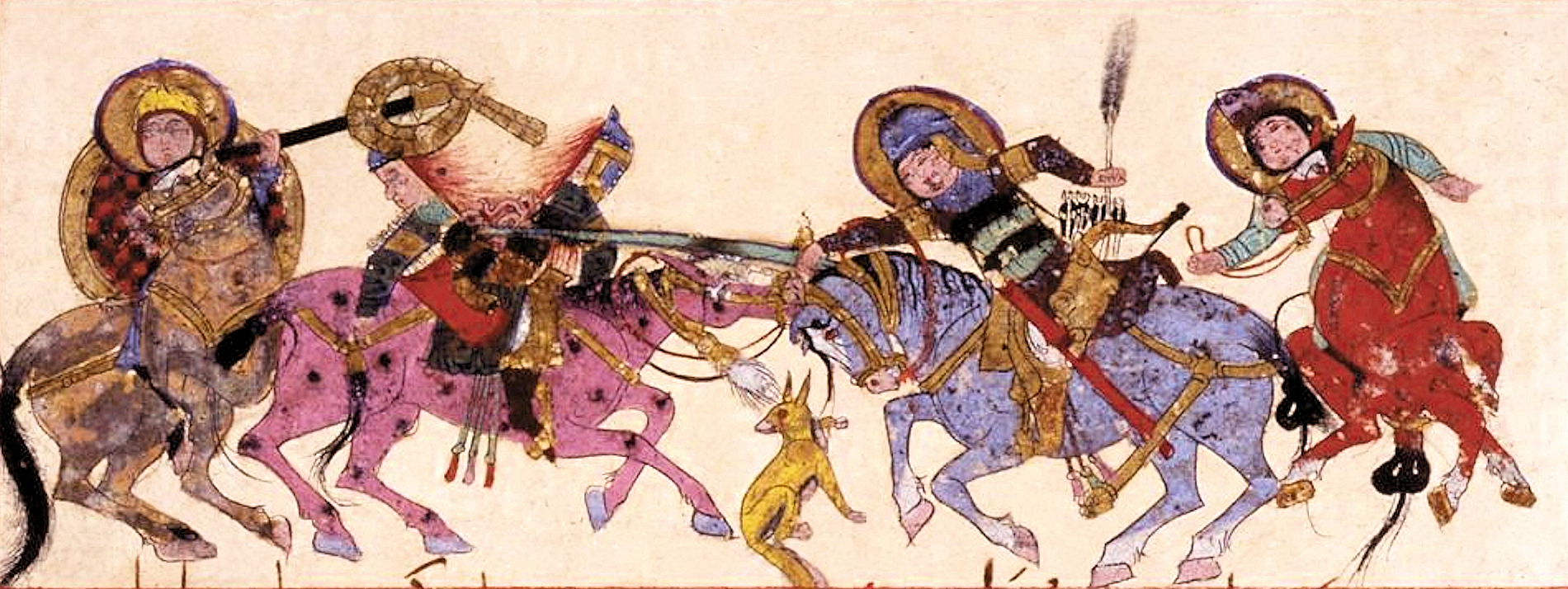
Battle scene, in Varka and Golshah, mid-13th century Seljuk Anatolia.

After reaching Anatolia, Frederick was promised safe passage through the region by the Turkish Sultanate of Rum, but was faced instead with constant Turkish hit-and-run attacks on his army. A Turkish army of 10,000 men was defeated at the Battle of Philomelion by 2,000 Crusaders, with 4,174–5,000 Turks slain. After continued Turkish raids against the Crusader army, Frederick decided to replenish his stock of animals and foodstuffs by conquering the Turkish capital of Iconium. On 18 May 1190, the German army defeated its Turkish enemies at the Battle of Iconium, sacking the city and killing 3,000 Turkish troops.

While crossing the Saleph River on 10 June 1190, Frederick's horse slipped, throwing him against the rocks; he then drowned in the river. After this, much of his army returned to Germany by sea in anticipation of the upcoming Imperial election. The Emperor's son, Frederick of Swabia, led the remaining 5,000 men to Antioch. There, the Emperor's body was boiled to remove the flesh, which was interred in the Church of Saint Peter; his bones were put in a bag to continue the crusade. In Antioch, however, the German army was further reduced by fever. Young Frederick had to ask the assistance of his kinsman Conrad of Montferrat to lead him safely to Acre, by way of Tyre, where his father's bones were buried. While the Imperial army did not achieve its objective of capturing Jerusalem, it did capture the capital of the Seljuk Sultanate and had inflicted considerable damage on Turkish forces, with more than 9,000 Turkish soldiers killed in all battles and skirmishes combined.

== Maritime crusades ==
There were two main passagium generale that travelled independently of the main armies from northern European waters between the spring and autumn of 1189. In addition, there were probably numerous unrecorded sailings on a smaller scale. Some may have sailed as early as 1188.

The earlier of the two fleets departed England during Lent. It was already a large international fleet, including some 10,000 men and 50–60 ships from England, Denmark, Frisia, Flanders, Holland and the Rhineland. After a stop in Lisbon, the fleet sacked Alvor and massacred its Almohad defenders. It arrived in Acre on 1 September 1189.

The later of the two main fleets is the better recorded, since a short eyewitness account of its feats has survived, the De itinere navali. It was composed mainly of commoners. It departed from Germany in April 1189 with eleven ships, although this was augmented after it arrived in Lisbon in early July by an English fleet that had set out in May. It was recruited by King Sancho I of Portugal to assist in an attack on Silves. At the ensuing siege of Silves, the fleet had 38 vessels, including two from Brittany and Galicia. The city capitulated after 45 days. The second fleet arrived at Acre between April and June 1190. According to the Narratio de primordiis ordinis theutonici, wood and sail from its cogs was used to construct a field hospital, which ultimately became the Teutonic Order.

According to the Bayān of Ibn Idhari, a northern fleet fought a naval battle with the Almohad navy near the Strait of Gibraltar in the spring of 1190 and was defeated, with its men being either killed or captured. The fleet may have wintered in Portugal. This incident is not mentioned in Christian sources. In the summer of 1190, a lone English ship separated from its fleet sailed into Silves while the city was besieged by the Almohads. Upon the request of Bishop Nicholas—himself a former member of the 1189 expedition—the English crusaders participated in the successful defence.

== Richard and Philip's crusade ==
Henry II of England and Philip II of France ended their war with each other in a meeting at Gisors in January 1188 and then both took the cross. Both imposed a "Saladin tithe" on their citizens to finance the venture. (No such tithe had been levied in the Empire.) In Britain, Baldwin of Forde, the archbishop of Canterbury, made a tour through Wales, convincing 3,000 men-at-arms to take up the cross, recorded in the Itinerarium Kambriae of Gerald of Wales. Baldwin would later accompany Richard on the Crusade and would die in the Holy Land.

=== Passage ===
Henry II of England died on 6 July 1189. Richard succeeded him and immediately began raising funds for the crusade. In the meantime, some of his subjects departed in multiple waves by sea. In April 1190, Richard's fleet departed from Dartmouth under the command of Richard de Camville and Robert de Sablé on their way to meet their king in Marseille. Parts of this fleet helped the Portuguese monarch defeat an Almohad counterattack against Santarém and Torres Novas, while another group ransacked Christian Lisbon until its leaders were arrested by the Portuguese monarch.

Richard and Philip II met in France at Vézelay and set out together on 4 July 1190 as far as Lyon where they parted after agreeing to meet in Sicily; Richard with his retinue, said to number 800, marched to Marseille and Philip to Genoa. Richard arrived in Marseille and found that his fleet had not arrived; he quickly tired of waiting for them and hiring ships, left for Sicily on 7 August, visiting several places in Italy en route and arrived in Messina on 23 September. Meanwhile, the English fleet eventually arrived in Marseille on 22 August, and finding that Richard had gone, sailed directly to Messina, arriving before him on 14 September. Philip had hired a Genoese fleet to transport his army, which consisted of 650 knights, 1,300 horses, and 1,300 squires to the Holy Land by way of Sicily.

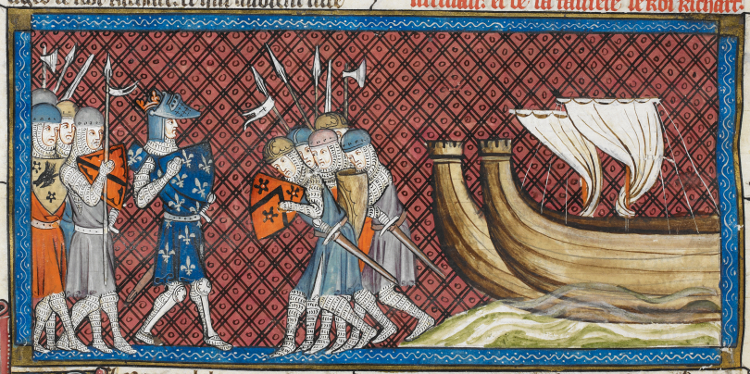
14th-century depiction of Philip II arriving in Palestine

William II of Sicily had died the previous year, and was replaced by Tancred, who imprisoned Joan of England—William's wife and Richard's sister. Richard captured the city of Messina on 4 October 1190 and Joan was released. Richard and Philip fell out over the issue of Richard's marriage, as Richard had decided to marry Berengaria of Navarre, breaking off his long-standing betrothal to Philip's half-sister Alys. Philip left Sicily directly for the Middle East on 30 March 1191 and arrived in Tyre in April; he joined the siege of Acre on 20 April. Richard did not set off from Sicily until 10 April.

Shortly after setting sail from Sicily, Richard's armada of 180 ships and 39 galleys was struck by a violent storm. Several ships ran aground, including one holding Joan, his new fiancée Berengaria and a large amount of treasure that had been amassed for the crusade. It was soon discovered that Isaac Doukas Komnenos of Cyprus had seized the treasure. The young women were unharmed. Richard entered Limassol on 6 May and met with Isaac, who agreed to return Richard's belongings and to send 500 of his soldiers to the Holy Land. Richard made camp at Limassol, where he received a visit from Guy of Lusignan, the King of Jerusalem, and married Berengaria, who was crowned queen. Once back at his fortress of Famagusta, Isaac broke his oath of hospitality and began issuing orders for Richard to leave the island. Isaac's arrogance prompted Richard to conquer the island within days, leaving sometime before June. The anonymous chronicler of Béthune, however, offers the intriguing suggestion that Richard attacked Cyprus because Isaac was diverting the food supply from the Latin army at Acre.Most modern scholars, however, accept that Richard's conquest of Cyprus was incidental.

=== Siege of Acre ===
Saladin released Guy of Jerusalem from prison in 1189. Guy attempted to take command of the Christian forces at Tyre, but Conrad of Montferrat held power there after his successful defence of the city from Muslim attacks. Guy turned his attention to the wealthy port of Acre. He amassed an army to besiege the city and received aid from Philip's newly arrived French army. The combined armies were not enough to counter Saladin, however, whose forces besieged the besiegers. In summer 1190, in one of the numerous outbreaks of disease in the camp, Queen Sibylla and her young daughters died. Guy, although only king by right of marriage, endeavoured to retain his crown, although the rightful heir was Sibylla's half-sister Isabella. After a hastily arranged divorce from Humphrey IV of Toron, Isabella was married to Conrad of Montferrat, who claimed the kingship in her name.

During the winter of 1190–91, there were further outbreaks of dysentery and fever, which claimed the lives of Frederick of Swabia, Patriarch Heraclius of Jerusalem, and Theobald V of Blois. When the sailing season began again in spring 1191, Leopold V of Austria arrived and took command of what remained of the imperial forces. Philip of France arrived with his troops from Sicily in May. A neighboring army under Leo II of Cilician Armenia also arrived.

Richard arrived at Acre on 8 June 1191 and immediately began supervising the construction of siege weapons to assault the city, which was captured on 12 July. Richard, Philip, and Leopold quarrelled over the spoils of the victory. Richard cast down the German standard from the city, slighting Leopold. In the struggle for the kingship of Jerusalem, Richard supported Guy, while Philip and Leopold supported Conrad, who was related to them both. It was decided that Guy would continue to rule but that Conrad would receive the crown upon his death. Frustrated with Richard (and in Philip's case, in poor health), Philip and Leopold took their armies and left the Holy Land in August. Philip left 7,000 French crusaders and 5,000 silver marks to pay them.

On 18 June 1191, soon after Richard's arrival at Acre, he sent a messenger to Saladin requesting a face to face meeting. Saladin refused, saying that it was customary for kings to meet each other only after a peace treaty had been agreed, and thereafter "it is not seemly for them to make war upon each other". The two therefore never met, although they did exchange gifts and Richard had a number of meetings with Al-Adil, Saladin's brother. Saladin tried to negotiate with Richard for the release of the captured Muslim soldier garrison, which included their women and children. On 20 August, however, Richard thought Saladin had delayed too much and had 2,700 of the Muslim prisoners decapitated in full view of Saladin's army, which tried unsuccessfully to rescue them. Saladin responded by killing all of the Christian prisoners he had captured. Following the fall of Acre, the Crusaders recaptured some inland parts of Galilee, including Mi'ilya and Bi'ina.

=== Battle of Arsuf ===
After the capture of Acre, Richard decided to march to the city of Jaffa. Control of Jaffa was necessary before an attack on Jerusalem could be attempted. On 7 September 1191, however, Saladin attacked Richard's army at Arsuf, 30 miles (50 km) north of Jaffa. Saladin attempted to harass Richard's army into breaking its formation in order to defeat it in detail. Richard maintained his army's defensive formation, however, until the Hospitallers broke ranks to charge the right wing of Saladin's forces. Richard then ordered a general counterattack, which won the battle. Arsuf was an important victory. The Muslim army was not destroyed, despite losing 7,000 men, but it did rout; this was considered shameful by the Muslims and boosted the morale of the Crusaders. Arsuf had dented Saladin's reputation as an invincible warrior and proved Richard's courage as soldier and his skill as a commander. Richard was able to take, defend, and hold Jaffa, a strategically crucial move toward securing Jerusalem. By depriving Saladin of the coast, Richard seriously threatened his hold on Jerusalem.

=== Advances on Jerusalem and negotiations ===
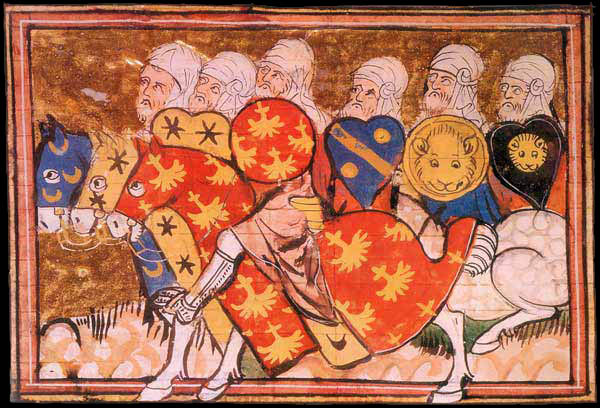
Saladin's troops, French manuscript, 1337

Following his victory at Arsuf, Richard took Jaffa and established his new headquarters there. He offered to begin negotiations with Saladin, who sent his brother, Al-Adil (known as 'Saphadin' to the Franks), to meet with Richard. Negotiations, which included attempts to marry Richard's sister Joan or niece Eleanor, Fair Maid of Brittany to Al-Adil respectively, failed, and Richard marched to Ascalon, which had been recently demolished by Saladin.

In November 1191 the Crusader army advanced inland towards Jerusalem. On 12 December Saladin was forced by pressure from his emirs to disband the greater part of his army. Learning this, Richard pushed his army forward, spending Christmas at Latrun. The army then marched to Beit Nuba, only 12 miles from Jerusalem. Muslim morale in Jerusalem was so low that the arrival of the Crusaders would probably have caused the city to fall quickly. Appallingly bad weather, cold with heavy rain and hailstorms, combined with fear that if the Crusader army besieged Jerusalem, it might be trapped by a relieving force, led to the decision to retreat back to the coast.

Richard called on Conrad to join him on campaign, but he refused, citing Richard's alliance with King Guy. He too had been negotiating with Saladin as a defence against any attempt by Richard to wrest Tyre from him for Guy. However, in April, Richard was forced to accept Conrad as king of Jerusalem after an election by the nobles of the kingdom. Guy had received no votes at all; Richard sold him Cyprus as compensation. Before he could be crowned, Conrad was stabbed to death by two Assassins in the streets of Tyre. Eight days later, Richard's nephew Henry II of Champagne married Queen Isabella, who was pregnant with Conrad's child. It was strongly suspected that the king's killers had acted on instructions from Richard.

During the winter months, Richard's men occupied and refortified Ascalon, whose fortifications had earlier been razed by Saladin. The spring of 1192 saw continued negotiations and further skirmishing between the opposing forces. On 22 May the strategically important fortified town of Darum on the frontiers of Egypt fell to the crusaders, following five days of fierce fighting. The Crusader army made another advance on Jerusalem, and in June it came within sight of the city before being forced to retreat again, this time because of dissention amongst its leaders. In particular, Richard and the majority of the army council wanted to force Saladin to relinquish Jerusalem by attacking the basis of his power through an invasion of Egypt. The leader of the French contingent, the Duke of Burgundy, however, was adamant that a direct attack on Jerusalem should be made. This split the Crusader army into two factions, and neither was strong enough to achieve its objective. Richard stated that he would accompany any attack on Jerusalem but only as a simple soldier; he refused to lead the army. Without a united command the army had little choice but to retreat back to the coast.

=== Saladin's attempt to recapture Jaffa ===
In July 1192, Saladin's army suddenly attacked and captured Jaffa with thousands of men, but Saladin lost control of his army due to their anger for the massacre at Acre. It is believed that Saladin even told the Crusaders to shield themselves in the Citadel until he had regained control of his army.

Richard had intended to return to England when he heard the news that Saladin and his army had captured Jaffa. Richard and a small force of little more than 2,000 men went to Jaffa by sea in a surprise attack. Richard's forces stormed Jaffa from their ships and the Ayyubids, who had been unprepared for a naval attack, were driven from the city. Richard freed those of the Crusader garrison who had been made prisoner, and these troops helped to reinforce the numbers of his army. Saladin's army still had numerical superiority, however, and they counter-attacked. Saladin intended a stealthy surprise attack at dawn, but his forces were discovered; he proceeded with his attack, but his men were lightly armoured and lost 700 men due to the missiles of the large numbers of Crusader crossbowmen. The battle to retake Jaffa ended in complete failure for Saladin, who was forced to retreat. This battle greatly strengthened the position of the coastal Crusader states.

On 2 September 1192, following his defeat at Jaffa, Saladin was forced to finalize a treaty with Richard providing that Jerusalem would remain under Muslim control, while allowing unarmed Christian pilgrims and traders to visit the city. Ascalon was a contentious issue as it threatened communication between Saladin's dominions in Egypt and Syria; it was eventually agreed that Ascalon, with its defences demolished, be returned to Saladin's control. Richard departed the Holy Land on 9 October 1192.

== Outcome ==
The Third Crusade did not achieve the goal of re-capturing Jerusalem. However, it facilitated the continuation of the Crusader states that were on the brink of collapse, which was further reinforced by the capture of Cyprus. Under the terms of the treaty, the Muslims retained control over most of historic Palestine and the surrounding regions, except for a narrow strip from Tyre to Jaffa, which remained under the Christians. Inland, parts of Galilee were regained by the Crusaders and further south, control of Ramla and Lydda were to be divided between the Kingdom of Jerusalem and the Ayyubid Sultanate. The Muslims remained in control of Jerusalem. Christian and Muslim pilgrims could safely conduct pilgrimages to Jerusalem. A three-year truce was also agreed upon by both sides. The Crusade itself has been described by historians as either a successful expedition, a failure, or hardly justified given the cost.

== Aftermath ==
Neither side was entirely satisfied with the results of the war. Though Richard's military victories had deprived the Muslims of important coastal territories and re-established a viable Frankish state in The Holy Land, many Christians in the Latin West felt disappointed that he had elected not to pursue the recapture of Jerusalem. Likewise, many in the Islamic world felt disturbed that Saladin had failed to drive the Christians out of Syria and the Holy Land. Trade flourished, however, throughout the Near East and in port cities along the Mediterranean coastline.

Saladin's scholar and biographer Baha al-Din recounted Saladin's distress at the successes of the Crusaders:

"I fear to make peace, not knowing what may become of me. Our enemy will grow strong, now that they have retained these lands. They will come forth to recover the rest of their lands and you will see every one of them ensconced on his hill-top," meaning in his castle, "having announced, 'I shall stay put' and the Muslims will be ruined." These were his words and it came about as he said.

Richard was arrested and imprisoned in December 1192 by Leopold V, Duke of Austria, who suspected Richard of murdering his cousin Conrad of Montferrat. Leopold had also been offended by Richard casting down his standard from the walls of Acre. He was later transferred to the custody of Henry VI, Holy Roman Emperor, and it took a ransom of one hundred and fifty thousand marks to obtain his release. Richard returned to England in 1194 and died of a crossbow bolt wound in 1199 at the age of 41 while suppressing a revolt in Limousin.

In 1193, Saladin died of yellow fever. His heirs would quarrel over the succession and ultimately fragment his conquests. Henry of Champagne was killed in an accidental fall in 1197. Queen Isabella then married for a fourth time, to Amalric of Lusignan, who had succeeded his brother Guy, positioned as King of Cyprus. After their deaths in 1205, her eldest daughter Maria of Montferrat (born after her father's murder) succeeded to the throne of Jerusalem. Accounts of events surrounding the Third Crusade were written by the anonymous authors of the Itinerarium Peregrinorum et Gesta Regis Ricardi (a.k.a. the Itinerarium Regis Ricardi), the Old French Continuation of William of Tyre (parts of which are attributed to Ernoul), and by Ambroise, Roger of Howden, Ralph of Diceto, and Giraldus Cambrensis.

== Bibliography ==
- Angold, Michael; et al. (The Crusader World) (2016). Boas, Adrian (ed.). The Fall of Jerusalem (1187) as viewed from Byzantium. Abingdon: Routledge. ISBN 978-0-4158-2494-1.
- Bachrach, Bernard S.; Bachrach, David S. (2017). Warfare in Medieval Europe c. 400 – c. 1453. Abingdon, Oxfordshire: Routledge. ISBN 978-1138887664.
- Baha ad-Din ibn Shaddad (2001). The Rare and Excellent History of Saladin. Translated by D. S. Richards. Aldershot: Ashgate. ISBN 0-7546-3381-0.
- James A. Brundage, ed. (1962). "De Expugnatione Terrae Sanctae per Saladinum". The Crusades: A Documentary Survey. Milwaukee: Marquette University Press. OCLC 1158132.
- Cameron Lyons, Malcolm; Pritchett Jackson, David Edward (2001). Saladin: Politics of the Holy War. Cambridge: Cambridge University Press. ISBN 0-5215-8562-7.
- Wendell David, Charles (1939). "Narratio de Itinere Navali Peregrinorum Hierosolymam Tendentium et Silviam Capientium, A.D. 1189". Proceedings of the American Philosophical Society. 81 (5).
- Edbury, Peter W., ed. (1998). The Conquest of Jerusalem and the Third Crusade: Sources in Translation. Aldershot: Ashgate. ISBN 1-8401-4676-1.
- Eddé, Anne-Marie (2011). Saladin. Cambridge, Mass.: Belknap Press. ISBN 978-0-674-05559-9.
- Freed, John (2016). Frederick Barbarossa: The Prince and the Myth. New Haven, Connecticut: Yale University Press. ISBN 978-0-300-122763.
- Gabrieli, F., ed. (1969). Arab Historians of the Crusades. London: Routledge. ISBN 0-520-05224-2.
- Gibb, H. A. R. (1973). The Life of Saladin: From the Works of ʻImād ad-Dīn and Bahāʼ ad-Dīn. Oxford: Clarendon Press. p. 69. ISBN 0198214995.
- Gillingham, John (1978). Richard the Lionheart. London: Weidenfeld & Nicolson. ISBN 0-297-77453-0.
- Hiller, Helmut (1979). Friedrich Barbarossa: Kaiser, Ritter, Held [Frederick Barbarossa: emperor, knight, hero] (in German). Munich: Heyne. ISBN 3-4535-5062-5.
- Hosler, John (2018). The Siege of Acre, 1189–1191: Saladin, Richard the Lionheart, and the Battle that Decided the Third Crusade. New Haven: Yale University Press. ISBN 978-0-30021-550-2.
- Humphreys, Stephen; et al. (The New Cambridge Medieval History) (2008). "Zengids, Ayyubids and Seljuqs". c. 1024 – c. 1198 Part II. Vol. IV. Cambridge: Cambridge University Press. ISBN 978-0-521-41411-1.
- Hurlock, Kathryn (2013). Britain, Ireland and the Crusades, c. 1000–1300. Basingstoke: Palgrave. ISBN 978-0-2302-9863-7.
- Khamisy, G.; et al. (The Crusader World) (2016). Boas, Adrian (ed.). Western Upper Galilee Under crusader Rule. Abingdon: Routledge. pp. 212–224. ISBN 978-0-4158-2494-1.
- Konstam, Angus (2002). Historical atlas of the Crusades. New York: Checkmark Books. ISBN 0-8160-4919-X.
- Lay, Stephen (2009). The Reconquest Kings of Portugal: Political and Cultural Reorientation on the Medieval Frontier. Palgrave Macmillan. ISBN 978-0230525610.
- Leiser, Gary; et al. (The New Cambridge History of Islam) (2011). "The Turks in Anatolia before the Ottomans: The Turkish invasion and the rise of the Saljuq sultanate of Anatolia". The Western Islamic World Eleventh to Eighteenth Centuries. Vol. II. Cambridge: Cambridge University Press. ISBN 978-0-521-83957-0.
- Loud, G. A. (2010). The Crusade of Frederick Barbarossa: The History of the Expedition of the Emperor Frederick and Related Texts. Farnham, Surrey: Ashgate Publishing. ISBN 978-0-7546-6575-5.
- Magoulias, Harry J., ed. (1984). O City of Byzantium. Annals of Niketas Choniates. Detroit: Wayne State University Press. ISBN 0-8143-1764-2.
- Marshall, Christopher (1992). Warfare in the Latin East, 1192–1291. Cambridge: Cambridge University Press. ISBN 0-5213-9428-7.
- Mayer, Hans Eberhard; et al. (The New Cambridge Medieval History) (2008). "The Latin east, 1098-1205". c. 1024 – c. 1198 Part II. Vol. IV. Cambridge: Cambridge University Press. ISBN 978-0-521-41411-1.
- McLynn, Frank (2007). Richard and John: Kings at War. Cambridge: Da Capo Press. ISBN 978-0-3068-1579-9.
- Mol, Johannes A. (2002). "Frisian Fighters and the Crusades" (PDF). Crusades. 1 (1). The Society for the Study of the Crusades and the Latin East: 89–110. doi:10.1080/28327861.2002.12220535. hdl:20.500.11755/5490e290-3c18-4adc-8376-65ac10541dfc. S2CID 161825224.
- Morton, Nicholas Edward (2009). The Teutonic Knights in the Holy Land, 1190–1191. Woodbridge: The Boydell Press. ISBN 978-1-8438-3477-9.
- Nicolle, David (2005). The Third Crusade 1191: Richard the Lionheart and the Battle for Jerusalem. Osprey Campaign. Vol. 161. Oxford: Osprey. ISBN 1-84176-868-5.
- Oman, Charles William Chadwick (1998) [1924]. 378–1278 AD. A History of the Art of War in the Middle Ages. Vol. I. London: Greenhill Books. ISBN 1-8536-7331-5.
- Riley-Smith, Jonathan; et al. (The New Cambridge Medieval History) (2008). "The crusades, 1095–1198". c. 1024 – c. 1198 Part I. Vol. IV. Cambridge: Cambridge University Press. ISBN 978-0-521-41410-4.
- Runciman, Steven (2016) [1957]. The Kingdom of Jerusalem and the Frankish East, 1100–1187. A History of the Crusades. Vol. II. Cambridge University Press. ISBN 978-0241298763.
- Runciman, Steven (2016b) [1954]. The Kingdom of Acre and the Later Crusades. A History of the Crusades. Vol. III. Cambridge University Press. ISBN 978-0241298770.
- Lee Wolff, Robert; Hazard, Harry W., eds. (1969). The Later Crusades, 1189–1311. A History of the Crusades. Vol. II. Madison, Wisconsin: University of Wisconsin Press.
- Shirley, Janet; Webster, Paul, eds. (2021). History of the dukes of Normandy and the kings of England. New York: Routledge. ISBN 978-1-1387-4349-6.
- Tyerman, Christopher (2006). God's War: A New History of the Crusades. Belknap Press. ISBN 978-0-674-02387-1.
- Villegas-Aristizabal, Lucas (2009). "Revisión de las crónicas de Ralph de Diceto y de la Gesta regis Ricardi sobre la participación de la flota angevina durante la Tercera Cruzada en Portugal". Studia Historica – Historia Medieval. 27: 153–170. doi:10.1080/17546559.2019.1704043.
- Villegas-Aristizabal, Lucas (2007). The Norman and Anglo-Norman Participation in the Iberian Reconquista, c. 1018–1248 (PDF) (Thesis). Nottingham: University of Nottingham Press. Archived from the original (PDF) on 18 July 2011..
- Wilson, Jonathan (2020). "'Neither age nor sex sparing': The Alvor Massacre 1189, an Anomaly in the Portuguese Reconquista?". Journal of Medieval Iberian Studies. 12 (2): 1–31 [199–229]. doi:10.1080/17546559.2019.1704043. S2CID 214374323.
