= Mos Teutonicus =

Postmortem funerary custom

Mos Teutonicus (English: Germanic custom) or less commonly Mos Gallicus (English: Gallic custom) was a postmortem funerary custom used in Europe in the Middle Ages as a means of transporting, and solemnly disposing of, the bodies of high-status individuals. Nobles would often undergo Mos Teutonicus if their burial plots were located far away from their place of death. The process involved the removal of the flesh from the body, so that the bones of the deceased could be transported hygienically from distant lands back home.

== Background ==
During the Middle Ages, nobles sometimes died far away from where they wished to be buried. They often wanted their hearts to be buried in their homeland, thus their bodies had to travel far distances. Emperor Charlemagne outlawed cremation, deeming destruction of the bones as destruction of the soul. Anyone who cremated a person's bones was subject to the death penalty. Thus, the practice of Mos Teutonicus came about as a way to preserve the bones over long distances without destroying them. Mos Teutonicus has been observed as early as the 10th century. Notable examples were multiple rulers from the Ottonian and Salian dynasties in which the rulers were transported to burial locations far from their place of death.

During the Second Crusade for the Holy Land it was not thought fit for aristocrats to be buried away from their homeland in Muslim territory. The transportation of the whole body over long distances was impractical and unhygienic due to decomposition. Mos Teutonicus was especially prevalent in warmer climates, such as around the Mediterranean Sea, since the body was subject to faster decay.

German aristocrats were particularly concerned that burial should not take place in the Holy Land, but rather on home soil. The Florentine chronicler Boncompagno was the first to connect the procedure specifically with German aristocrats, and coins the phrase Mos Teutonicus, meaning 'the Germanic custom'. (Note: Boncompagno refers to the practice in a derogatory manner, placing mos Teutonicus in a passage with Jewish and Roman burial customs designed to preserve the dignity and honour of the body. He claims the Germans (teutonici) dismember the bodies of their most eminent people.)

English and French aristocrats generally preferred embalming to Mos Teutonicus, involving the burial of the entrails and heart in a separate location from the corpse. One of the advantages of Mos Teutonicus was that it was relatively economical in comparison with embalming, and more hygienic.

Corpse preservation was very popular in medieval society. The decaying body was seen as representative of something sinful and evil. Embalming and Mos Teutonicus, along with tomb effigies, were methods of giving the corpse an illusion of stasis and removed the uneasy image of putrefaction and decay.

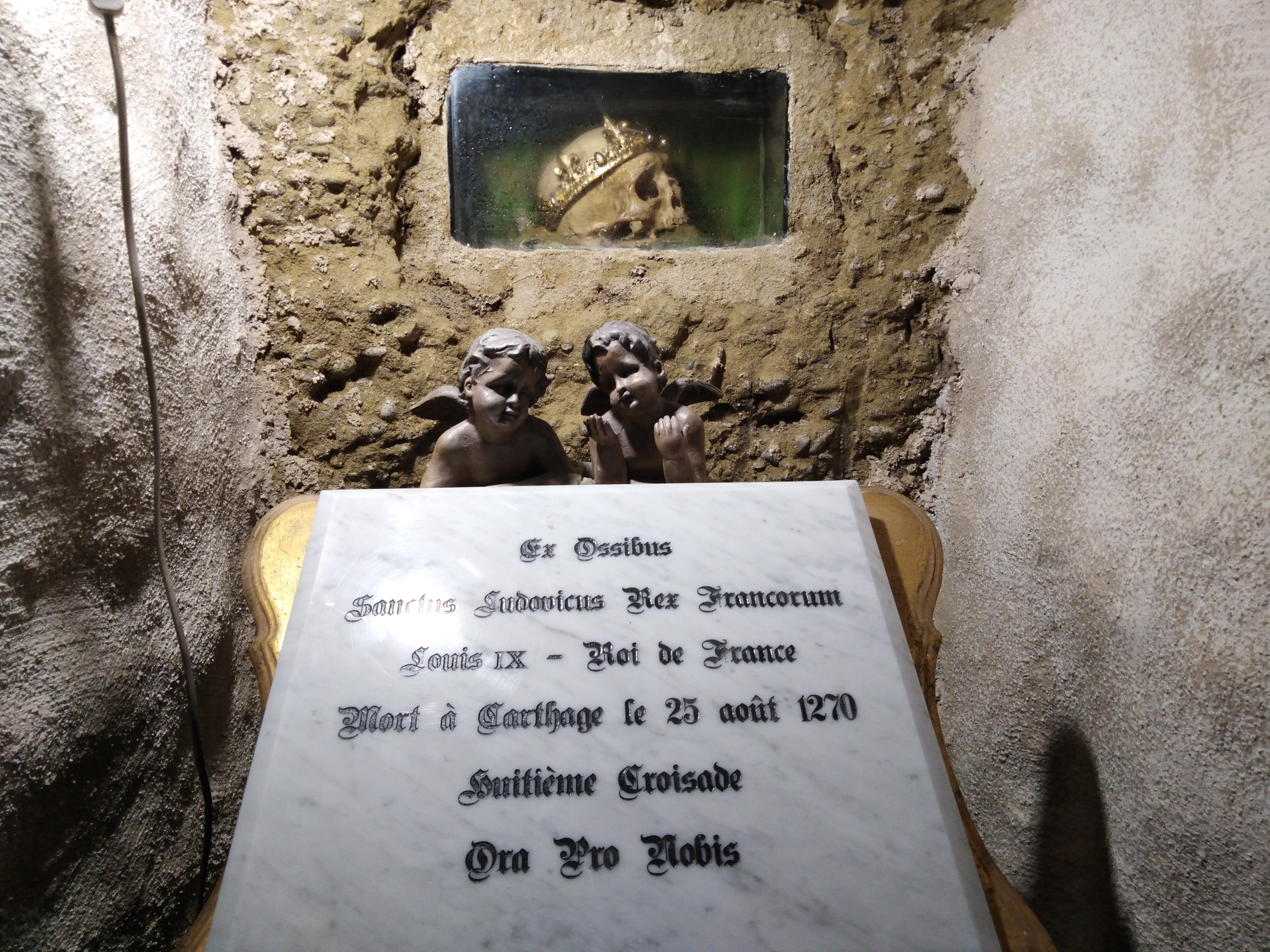
Skull of Louis IX in Saint-Laurent-du-Var, France

In 1270, the body of King Louis IX, who died in Tunis, which was Muslim territory, was subject to the process of Mos Teutonicus for its transportation back to France.

== Process ==
The process of Mos Teutonicus began with the cadaver being dismembered to facilitate the next stage in the process, in which the body parts were boiled in water, wine, milk, or vinegar for several hours. The boiling had the effect of separating the flesh from the bone. The heart and intestines needed to be removed in order to allow for proper transfer of the bones. Any residual was scraped from the bones, leaving a completely clean skeleton. Both the flesh and internal organs could be buried immediately, or preserved with salt in the same manner as animal meat. The bones could then be sprinkled with perfumes or fragrances. The bones and any preserved flesh, would then be transported back to the deceased's homeland for ceremonial interment.

Medieval society generally regarded entrails as ignoble and there was no great solemnity attached to their disposal, especially among German aristocrats.

== Prohibition ==
Although the Church had a high regard for the practice, Pope Boniface VIII was known to have an especial repugnance of Mos Teutonicus because of his ideal of bodily integrity. In his bull of 1299, De Sepulturis, Boniface forbade the practice. The papal bull issued which banned this practice was often misinterpreted as prohibition against human dissection. This may have hindered anatomical research, if anatomists feared repercussions and punishment as a result of medical autopsies, but De Sepulturis only prohibited the act of Mos Teutonicus, not dissection in general (medieval physicians were known to have widely practiced dissection and autopsy, though most had an assistant perform the actual incisions and manipulations of cadavers). The practice of Mos Teutonicus eventually stopped in the 15th century.

== See also ==
- Excarnation
