= Graham Loud =

English professor emeritus of medieval history (born 1953)

Graham Loud FRHistS
- Born: Graham Anthony Loud; 19 January 1953 (age 73); Honiton, Devon, United Kingdom

Academic background
- Education: Merton College, Oxford; Christ Church, Oxford
- Academic advisor: H. E. J. Cowdrey

Academic work
- Discipline: History
- Sub-discipline: Italian history; medieval history
- Institutions: University of Leeds

Graham Anthony Loud FRHistS (born 1953) is a professor emeritus of medieval history at the University of Leeds. Loud is a specialist in the history of southern Italy during the Central Middle Ages (tenth to thirteenth centuries), and also in German history in the Staufen period.

== Selected publications ==
- Church and Society in the Norman Principality of Capua 1058-1197 (Oxford, Clarendon Press, 1985) xv + 283 pp.
- Church and Chronicle in the Middle Ages. Essays Presented to John Taylor, edited by G.A. Loud and I.N. Wood (London, Hambledon, 1991) xxvi + 270 pp.
- The History of the Tyrants of Sicily by Hugo Falcandus 1154-69 [with Thomas Wiedemann] (Manchester Medieval Translations 1998), xvii + 286 pp.
- Conquerors and Churchmen in Norman Italy (Variorum Collected Studies Series, Aldershot 1999), xii + 314 pp.
- Montecassino and Benevento in the Middle Ages. Essays in South Italian Church History (Variorum Collected Studies Series, Aldershot 2000), xi + 334 pp.
- The Age of Robert Guiscard: Southern Italy and the Norman Conquest ( Harlow: Longman/Pearson Education 2000), xii + 329 pp.
- The Society of Norman Italy, edited by G.A. Loud & A. Metcalfe ( Leiden: Brill, 2002), xx + 347 pp.
- The Latin Church in Norman Italy (Cambridge University Press 2007), xviii + 577 pp.
- The Crusade of Frederick Barbarossa. The History of the Expedition of the Emperor Frederick and Related Texts (Ashgate: Crusader Texts in Translation 19, 2010), xv + 225 pp.
- Roger II and the Creation of the Kingdom of Sicily (Manchester Medieval Sources, 2012), 389 pp.
- The Making of Medieval History, ed. G.A. Loud and Martial Staub (York Medieval Press / Boydell and Brewer 2017), xvi + 240 pp.
- The Origins of the German Principalities 1100–1350, ed. G.A. Loud and Jochen Schenck (Routledge 2017), xlii + 399 pp.
- The Chronicle of Arnold of Lübeck (Routledge: Crusade Texts in Translation, 2019), xiv + 320 pp.
- Pergamene scelte della badia di Cava, 1097-1200 (Centro europeo di studi normanni, Ariano Irpino, 2021), 404 pp.
- The Social World of the Abbey of Cava, c. 1020-1300 (Boydell and Brewer 2021), xxxiii + 417 pp.
