= Jouhe =

Commune in Bourgogne-Franche-Comté, France

- Commune
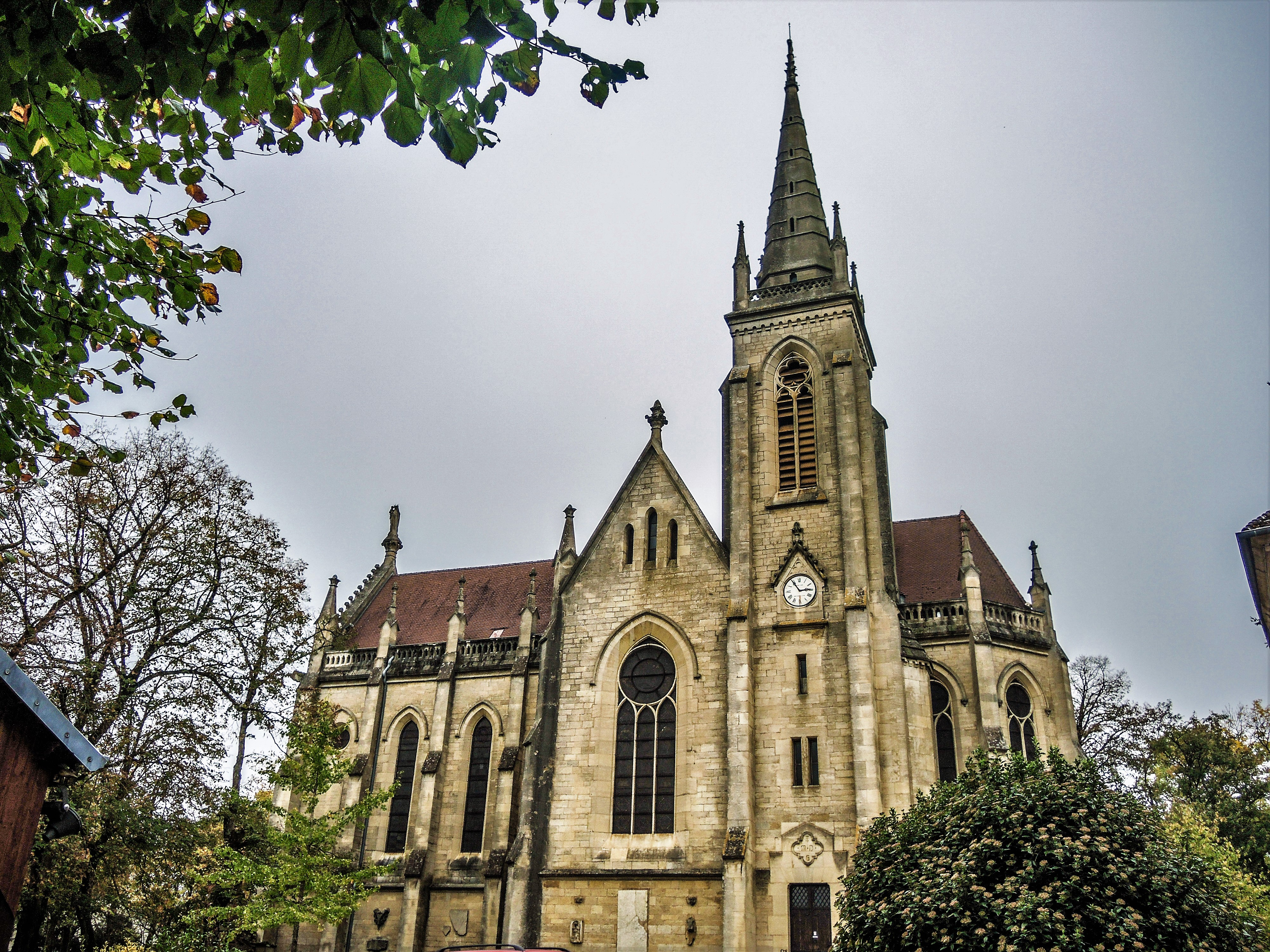
- The basilica in Jouhe
- Location of Jouhe
- Location within France Location within Bourgogne-Franche-Comté
- Coordinates: 47°08′32″N 5°29′25″E
- Country: France
- Region: Bourgogne-Franche-Comté
- Department: Jura
- Arrondissement: Dole
- Canton: Authume
- Intercommunality: CA Grand Dole

Government
  - Mayor (2020–2026): Joël Gerdy
- Area^{1}: 5.96 km^{2} (2.30 sq mi)
- Highest elevation: 342 m (1,122 ft)
- Lowest elevation: 202 m (663 ft)
- Population (2023): 531
  - Density: 89.1/km^{2} (231/sq mi)
- Time zone: UTC+01:00 (CET)
  - Summer (DST): UTC+02:00 (CEST)
- INSEE/Postal code: 39270 /39100
- ^{1} French Land Register data, which excludes lakes, ponds, glaciers > 1 km^{2} (0.386 sq mi or 247 acres) and river estuaries.

Jouhe (French pronunciation: [ʒu]) is a commune in the Jura department in Bourgogne-Franche-Comté in eastern France.

== Population ==
Historical population
Year	Pop.	±% p.a.
1968	372	—
1975	316	−2.30%
1982	398	+3.35%
1990	359	−1.28%
1999	437	+2.21%
2007	492	+1.49%
2012	591	+3.73%
2017	563	−0.97%
2023	531	−0.97%
Source: INSEE

== See also ==
- Communes of the Jura department
