= List of nobles and magnates of France in the 13th century =

The following is a list of nobles and magnates in the Kingdom of France in the 13th century.

== Kings of France ==
Portrait	Coat of arms	Name	King from	King until	Relationship with predecessor(s)	Title
		Philip II Augustus (Philippe Auguste)	18 September 1180	14 July 1223	• Son of Louis VII	King of the Franks (Roi des Francs); King of France (Roi de France)
		Louis VIII the Lion	14 July 1223	8 November 1226	• Son of Philip II Augustus	King of France (Roi de France)
		Louis IX the Saint (Saint Louis)	8 November 1226	25 August 1270	• Son of Louis VIII	King of France (Roi de France)
		Philip III the Bold (Philippe)	25 August 1270	5 October 1285	• Son of Louis IX	King of France (Roi de France)
		Philip IV the Fair, the Iron King (Philippe)	5 October 1285	29 November 1314	• Son of Philip III	King of France and of Navarre (Roi de France et de Navarre)

== Peers of France ==
Note: Ecclesiastical peers must have had the title for at least five years to be listed here to avoid clutter. If there is no peer listed for a certain number of years under 5, it does not necessarily mean that the position was vacant.

Title	Coats of Arms	1st	2nd	3rd	4th	5th	6th	7th	8th	9th
Archbishops of Reims		Aubry of Humbert (1207–1218)	William of Joinville (1219–1226)	Henri de Dreux (1227–1240)	Juhel de Mathefelon (1245–1250)	Thomas de Beaumes (1251–1263)	Pierre Barbette (1273–1298)			
Duke-Bishop of Laon		Roger de Rosoy (1175–1207)	Robert de Châtillon (1210–1215)	Anselme de Mauny (1215–1238)	Garnier (1238–1248)	Ithier de Mauny (1248–1261)	Guillaume des Moustiers (1262–1269)	Geoffroy de Beaumont (1270–1279)	Guillaume de Châtillon (1280–1285)	Robert of Thourotte (1285–1297)
Duke-Bishop of Langres		Hutin de Vandeuvre (1200–1205)	Robert de Châtillon (1205–1210)	Guillaume de Joinville (1210–1226)	Hugues de Montréal (1220–1236)	Robert of Thourotte (1236–1242)	Hugues de Rochecorbon (1242–1250)	Guy de Rochefort (1250–1266)	Guy de Genève (1266–1291)	Jean de Rochefort (1294–1305)
Dukes of Normandy		John, King of England (Nominal 1199–1216)	Henry III of England (Nominal 1216–1259)	Confiscated by the Crown of France						
Dukes of Aquitaine		John, King of England (1199–1216)	Henry III of England (1216–1272)	Edward I of England (1272–1307)						
Dukes of Burgundy		Odo III (1192–1218)	Hugh IV (1218–1271)	Robert II (1271–1306)						
Count-Bishops of Beauvais		Philip of Dreux (1175–1217)	Milo of Nanteuil (1217–1234)	Robert de Cressonsacq (1237–1248)	Guillaume de Grès (1249–1267)	Renaud de Nanteuil (1267–1283)	Thibaud de Nanteuil (1283–1300)			
Count-Bishops of Châlons		Gérard de Douai (1200–1215)	William II, Count of Perche (1215–1226)	Philip II (1228–1237)	Geoffroy de Grandpré (1241–1247)	Pierre of Hans (1248–1261)	Conon de Vitry (1262–1269)	Rémi de Somme-Tourbe (1273–1284)	John of Châteauvillain (1285–1313)	
Count-Bishops of Noyon		Étienne de Nemours (1188–1221)	Gérard de Bazoches (1222–1228)	Nicolas de Roye (1228–1240)	Pierre Charlot (1240–1249)	Vermond de La Boissière (1250–1272)	Guy des Prés (1272–1297)			
Counts of Flanders		Baldwin I, Latin Emperor, as Baldwin IX (1194–1205)	Joan (1205–1244, through husbands)	Guy of Dampierre (1251–1305)						
Counts of Champagne		Theobald I of Navarre, as Theobald IV (1201–1253)	Theobald II of Navarre, as Theobald V (1253–1270)	Henry I of Navarre, as Henry III (1270–1274)	Joan I of Navarre (1274–1305)					
Counts of Toulouse		Raymond VI (1194–1222)	Simon de Montfort, 5th Earl of Leicester (1215–1218)	Raymond VII (1222–1249)	Joan (1249–1271)	Alphonse, Count of Poitiers (1249–1271)				

Duchy of Brittany. Unlike other powerful statelets in France, Brittany was neither part of the Holy Roman Empire nor of France. It had a Celtic language.
Title	Coat of Arms	1st	2nd	3rd	4th	5th
Duke of Brittany		Guy of Thouars (1199–1201, 1203–1213, Jure uxoris)	Arthur I (1196–1203, co-ruler)	Peter I(1213–1221, Jure uxoris)	John I (1221–1286)	John II (1286–1305)

== Archbishops ==
See Peers for more Archbishops
#	Title	Region	1st	2nd	3rd	4th	5th	6th	7th	8th	9th	10th
1	Archbishops of Aix	Provence	Gui de Fos (1186–1212)	Bermond Cornut (1212–1223)	Raimond Audibert (1223–1251)	Philip I (1251–1257)	Vicedomino de Vicedominis (1257–1273)	Grimier Vicedominus (1274–1282)	Rostan de Noves (1283–1311)			
2	Archbishops of Arles	Provence	Imbert d'Eyguière (1191–1202)	Michel de Morèse (1202–1217)	Uc Béroard (1218–1232)	Jean Baussan (1233–1258)	Bertran Malferrat (1258–1262)	Florent (1262–1266)	Bertran de Saint-Martin (1266–1273)	Bernard de Languissel (1274–1281)	Bertrand Amalric (1281–1286)	Rostaing de la Capre (1286–1303)
3	Archbishops of Auch	Gascony	Bernardus (1201)	Garsias de l'Ort(1215–1226)	Amanevus de Grisinhac (1226–1241)	Hispanus de Massanc (1244–1261)	Amanevus (1262–1318)					
4	Archbishops of Bourges	Blois & Berry	William of Donjeon (1200–1209)	Girard de Cros (1209–1218)	Simon de Sully (1218–1232)	Philippe Berruyer (1232–1260)	Jean de Sully (1260–1271)	Guy de Sully (1276–1280)	Simon de Beaulieu (1281–1294	Gilles de Rome (1295–1316)		
5	Archbishops of Lyon	Burgundy	Renaud de Forez (1193–1226)	Bérard de Got (1289)	Louis of Naples (1290–1295)							
6	Archbishops of Narbonne	Toulouse	Berengar of Barcelona (1191–1212)	Arnaldus Amalric (1212–1225)	Pierre Amiel(1226–1245)	Guillaume de Broue (1245–1257)	Jacques (1257–1259)	Guy de Foulques (1259–1261)	Maurinus (1262–1272)	Pierre de Montbrun (1272–1286)	Gilles I Aycelin de Montaigu (1287–1311)	
7	Archbishops of Rouen	Normandy	Walter de Coutances (1184–1208)	Robert III Poulain (1208–1222)	Thibaud d'Amiens (1222–1231)	Maurice (1231–1237)	Peter II de Colmieu (1237–1245)	Eudes I Clement (1245–1247)	Eudes II Rigaud (1247–1276)	William II de Flavacourt (1276–1306)		
8	Archbishop of Sens	Ile de France	Peter of Corbeil (1200–1222)	Philippe de Marigny	William of Paris							
9	Archbishops of Tours	Touraine	Barthelemy de Vendôme (1174–1206)	Géoffroy de la Lande (1206–1208)	Jean de la Faye (1208–1228)	Juhel de Mathefelon (1229–1244)	Géoffroy Marcel (1245–1251)	Pierre de Lamballe (1252–1256)	Vincent de Pirmil (1257–1270)	Jean de Montsoreau (1271–1284)	Bouchard Dain (1286–1290)	Renaud de Montbazon (1296–1312)

== Dukes ==
See Peers for more Dukes
#	Title	Region	Leigelord	Coat of arms	1st	2nd	3rd	4th	5th	6th	7th	8th	9th
1	Dukes of Brittany	Brittany	Kings of France		Guy of Thouars (1199–1213 Jure uxoris)	Arthur I, Duke of Brittany (1196–1203 as co-ruler)	Peter I, Duke of Brittany (1213–1221 Jure uxoris)	John I, Duke of Brittany (1221–1286)	John II, Duke of Brittany (1286–1305)				
2	Dukes of Narbonne	Toulouse	Kings of France		See Counts of Toulouse								
3	Dukes of Lorraine	Lorraine	Holy Roman Emperor		Simon II, Duke of Lorraine (1176–1205)	Frederick I, Duke of Lorraine (1205–1206)	Frederick II, Duke of Lorraine (1206–1213)	Theobald I, Duke of Lorraine (1213–1220)	Matthias II, Duke of Lorraine (1220–1251)	Frederick III, Duke of Lorraine (1251–1302)			
4	Dukes of Burgundy	Burgundy	Kings of France		Eudes III, Duke of Burgundy (1192–1218)	Hugh IV, Duke of Burgundy (1218–1271)	Robert II, Duke of Burgundy (1271–1306)						
5	Dukes of Aquitaine	Aquitaine	Kings of England		John, King of England (1199–1216)	Henry III of England (1216–1272)	Edward I of England (1272–1307)						
6	Dukes of Normandy	Normandy	Kings of England		John, King of England (Nominal 1199–1216)	Henry III of England (1216–1272)	Confiscated by the Crown of France						
7	Duke-Bishop of Langres		Kings of France		Hutin de Vandeuvre (1200–1205)	Robert de Châtillon (1205–1210)	Hugues de Montréal (1220–1236)	Robert de Torote (1236–1242)	Hugues de Rochecorbon (1242–1250)	Guy de Rochefort (1250–1266)	Guy de Genève (1266–1291)	Jean de Rochefort (1294–1305)	
8	Duke-Bishop of Laon		Kings of France		Roger de Rosoy (1175–1207)	Robert de Châtillon (1210–1215)	Anselme de Mauny (1215–1238)	Garnier (1238–1248)	Ithier de Mauny (1248–1261)	Guillaume des Moustiers (1262–1269)	Geoffroy de Beaumont (1270–1279)	Guillaume de Châtillon (1280–1285)	Robert de Torote (1285–1297)

== Marquises ==
#	Title	Coat of arms	Region	1st	2nd
1	Marquis of Anduze/Gothia		Toulouse	Bernard d'Anduze (Marquis) (1200–1223)	Pierre Bermond (1223–1254)
2	Marquis of Provence		Provence	See Counts of Toulouse	
3	Marquis of Fos-sur-Mer		Provence	Pons de Fos	

== Counts ==
Greater Counts
#	Title	Coat of Arms	Region	1st	2nd	3rd	4th	5th	6th	7th
1	Counts of Anjou		Anjou	Arthur I, Duke of Brittany (1199–1203)	John I Tristan (Anjou) (1219–1232)	Charles I of Anjou (1246–1285)	Charles II of Naples (1285–1290)	Margaret, Countess of Anjou (1290–1299)		
2	Counts of Auvergne		Auvergne	Guy II of Auvergne (1195–1224)	William X of Auvergne (1224–1246)	Robert V, count of Auvergne (1246–1277)	William XI of Auvergne (1277–1279)	Robert VI, count of Auvergne (1279–1317)		
3	Counts of Blois		Blois & Berry	Louis I, Count of Blois (1191–1205)	Theobald VI, Count of Blois (1205–1218)	Walter II of Avesnes (1218–1230)	Hugh I, Count of Blois (1226–1241)	John I, Count of Blois (1241–1280)	Joan, Countess of Blois (1280–1291)	Hugh II, Count of Blois (1291–1307)
4	Counts of Maine		Maine	John, King of England (1199–1204)	French Royal Domain 1204–1219 & 1232–1246	John Tristan de Maine (1219–1232)	Charles I of Anjou (1246–1285)	Charles II of Naples (1285–1290)	Charles, Count of Valois (1290–1314)	
5	Counts of La Marche		La Marche	Hugues IX de Lusignan (1199–1219)	Hugh X of Lusignan (1219–1249)	Hugues XI de Lusignan (1249–1250)	Hugues XII de Lusignan (1250–1270)	Hugues XIII de Lusignan (1270–1303)	Guy de Lusignan (1303–1308)	
6	Counts of Nevers		Nevers	Hervé IV of Donzy (1199–1223)	Guigues IV of Forez (1226-11241)	Odo, Count of Nevers (1257–1262)	John Tristan, Count of Valois (1265–1270)	Robert III, Count of Flanders (1272–1280)	Louis I, Count of Nevers (1280–1322)	
7	Counts of Périgord		Périgord	Elias V de Périgord (1166–1205)	Archambaud I of Périgord (1205–1212)	Archambaud II of Périgord (1212–1239)	Elias VI of Périgord (1239–1251)	Archambaud III of Périgord (1251–1295)	Elias VII of Périgord (1295–1311)	
8	Counts of Poitiers		Poitou	Richard of Cornwall (1224–1241, nominal after 1224)	Alphonse, Count of Poitiers (1225–71)	Philip V of France (1291–1322)				
9	Counts of Valois		Vermandois & Ponthieu	French Royal Domain	John Tristan, Count of Valois (1268–1270)	Charles, Count of Valois (1284–1325)				
10	Counts of Vermandois		Vermandois & Ponthieu	Eleanor, Countess of Vermandois (1183–1214)	Added to the French Royal Domain					

Lesser Counts
#	Title	Region	Liege Lord (after 1204)	Coat of arms	1st	2nd	3rd	4th	5th	6th	7th	8th
	Counts of Agen	Aquitaine	Kings of England		Bishops of Agen							
	Counts of Albon		Holy Roman Emperors		Dauphins of Vienne							
	Counts of Alencon	Normandy	King of France		Robert I, count of Alençon (~1191-1217)	Peter I, Count of Alençon (1269–1283)	Charles I (1285–1325)					
	Counts of Annappes	Flanders	Count of Flanders		Counts of Flanders							
	Counts of Angouleme	Angouleme	King of England		Aymer of Angoulême (1186–1202)	John, King of England (1202–1216)	Isabelle d'Angoulême (1216–1246)	Hugues X de Lusignan (1220–1246)	Hugh XI of Lusignan (1246–1250)	Hugh XII of Lusignan (1250–1270)	Hugh XIII of Lusignan (1270–1303)	Guy de Lusignan (1303–1308)
	Counts of Anjou	Anjou	Kings of France		John, King of England (1199–1204)	Royal Domain of France	John I Tristan (1219–1232)	Charles I of Anjou (1246–1285)				
	Counts of Artois	Artois	King of France		Louis VIII of France (1190–1223)	Robert I, Count of Artois (1237–1250)	Robert II, Count of Artois (1250–1302)					
	Counts of Arles	Provence	Holy Roman Emperor		Counts of Provence							
	Counts of Armagnac	Gascony	Duke of Aquitaine (King of England)		Géraud IV of Armagnac (1193–1215)	Gerald V of Armagnac (1215–1219)	Pierre Geraud of Armagnac (1219–1241)	Bernard V of Armagnac (1241–1243)	Arnaud Odon of Armagnac (1243–1255)	Eskivat de Chabanais(1255–1256)	Gerald VI, Count of Armagnac(1256–1285)	Bernard VI, Count of Armagnac(1285–1319)
	Counts of Astarac	Aquitaine	Kings of England		Centule I of Astarac (1174–1233)	Centule II of Astarac (1233–1249)	Bernard IV of Astarac (1249–1291)	Centule III of Astarac (1291–1300)				
	Counts of Aumale	Normandy	King of France		Royal Domain of the Kings of France	Renaud I, Count of Dammartin (1204–1214)	Mathilde de Dammartin (1227–1260) with husbands Philip I, Count of Boulogne (1227–1234), Afonso III of Portugal (1238–1253)	Simon, Count of Ponthieu (1234–1239)	Joan, Countess of Ponthieu (1239–1278) with husband Ferdinand III of Castile (1239–1252)	Ferdinand of Castile (born 1238) (1252–1260)	John I, Count of Aumale (1260–1302)	
	Counts of Autun	Burgundy	Dukes of Burgundy		Dukes of Burgundy							
	Counts of Auvergne	Auvergne	King of France		Guy II of Auvergne (1195–1224)	William X of Auvergne (1224–1246)	Robert V of Auvergne (1247–1277)	William XI of Auvergne (1277–1280)	Robert VI of Auvergne (1280–1314)			
	Counts of Auxerre	Burgundy	Duke of Burgundy		Peter II of Courtenay (1184–1218)	Hervé of Donzy (1218–1257)	Guy II of Châtillon (1223–1225)	Archambaud of Dampierre (12??-1254)	Odo of Burgundy (1257–1261)	John I (1273–1290)	William VI (1290–1304)	
	Counts of Auxios	Burgundy	Duke of Burgundy		Dukes of Burgundy							
	Counts of Auxonne	Burgundy	Dukes of Burgundy		Stephen III of Auxonne (1173–1237)	John, Count of Chalon (1237)	Dukes of Burgundy					
	Counts of Avallon	Burgundy	Dukes of Burgundy		Dukes of Burgundy							
	Counts of Avignon	Provence	Counts of Toulouse		Counts of Toulouse	Royal Domain	Charles II of Naples (1290–1309)					
	Counts of Bar		Holy Roman Emperor		Theobald I, Count of Bar (1189–1214)	Henry II, Count of Bar (1214–1239)	Theobald II, Count of Bar (1239–1291)	Henry III, Count of Bar (1291–1302)				
	Counts of Bar-Sur-Aube	Champagne	Counts of Champagne		Counts of Champagne							
	Counts of Bar—sur-Seine	Burgundy	Burgundy, Lorraine 1216–1220		Milo IV, lord of Le Puiset (1190–1219)	Theobald I of Navarre (1219–1253)	Theobald II of Navarre (1253–1270)	Henry I of Navarre (1270–1274)	Joan I of Navarre (1274–1305)			
	Counts of Bayeux	Normandy	Kings of France		Bishop of Bayeux or Royal Domain							
	Counts of Beauvais		Kings of France		Bishop of Beauvais							
	Counts of Belfort				Richard III of Montfaucon (1195–1227)	Thierry III of Montbeliard (1227–1283)	Reginald of Burgundy (1283–1322)					
	Counts of Bigorre	Toulouse	King of England?		Gaston VI, Viscount of Béarn (1196–1214)	Nuño Sánchez (1214–1216)	Guy de Montfort, Count of Bigorre (1216–1220)	Aimeric of Racon (1221–1224)	Boso of Matha (Mastas) (1224–1247)	Raoul of Courtenay (1251–1256) by right of his wife Alice, Countess of Bigorre	Eskivat de Chabanais (1255–1283)	Laure of Chabanais (1283–1302)
	Counts of Bitche	Lorraine	Dukes of Lorraine		Frederick I, Duke of Lorraine (1188–1206)	Frederick II, Duke of Lorraine (1206–1213)	Renaud von Blieskastel (1238–1274)	Frederick III, Duke of Lorraine (1274–1297)	Eberhard von zweibrucken(1297–1321)			
	Counts of Blois		Kings of France		Louis I, Count of Blois (1191–1205)	Theobald VI, Count of Blois (1205–1218)	Margaret, Countess of Blois (1218–1230) with husband Walter II of Avesnes	Mary, Countess of Blois (1230–1241) with husband Hugh I, Count of Blois	John I, Count of Blois (1241–1280)	Joan, Countess of Blois (1280–1291) with husband Peter I, Count of Alençon	Hugh II, Count of Blois (1291–1307)	
	Counts of Boulogne	Normandy	Kings of France		Ida (1173–1216)	Matilda II, Countess of Boulogne (1216–1223 in her own right)	Philip I (1223–1235)	Afonso (1235–1253)	Robert I (1261–1277)	Robert II (1277–1314)		
	Counts of Bordeaux	Aquitaine	Kings of England		King of England							
	Counts of Braine		Kings of France		Robert II, Count of Dreux (1184–1218)	Robert III, Count of Dreux (1218–1234)	John I, Count of Dreux (1234–1249)	Robert IV, Count of Dreux (1249–1282)	John II, Count of Dreux (1282–1309)			
	Counts of Briançon		Holy Roman Emperors		Dauphins of Vienne							
	Counts of Brienne	Champagne	Counts of Champagne		Walter III (1191–1205)	Walter IV (1205–1246)	John (1246–1260)	Hugh (1260–1296)	Walter V (1296–1311)			
	Counts of Brionne	Normandy	Kings of England/Kings of France		Robert de Beaumont, Count of Meulan (1166–1204)	Royal Domain of France	Jean II of Harcourt (1286–1302)					
	Counts of Brioude	Auvergne	King of France		Canon-Counts of Brioude							
	Counts of Burgundy	Free Burgundy	Holy Roman Emperors		Joan I, Countess of Burgundy (1200–1205)	Beatrice II, Countess of Burgundy (1205–1231)	Otto I, Duke of Merania (1208–1231)	Otto III, Count of Burgundy (1231–1248)	Adelaide, Countess of Burgundy (1248–1279) Hugh, Count of Burgundy (1248–1266) Philip I, Count of Savoy (1268–1285)	Otto IV, Count of Burgundy (1279–1303)		
	Counts of Cambrai		Holy Roman Emperors		Bishops of Cambrai							
	Counts of Carcassonne		Kings of Aragon		Kings of Aragon							
	Counts of Cerdanya	Pyrenees	King of Aragon		Sancho, Count of Provence (1128–1223)	Nuño Sánchez (1223–1241)	James I of Aragon (1242–1276)	James II of Majorca (1276–1311				
	Counts of Chalon		Holy Roman Emperor		John, Count of Chalon (1200–1237)	Duke of Burgundy						
	Counts of Champagne	Chamagne	Kings of France		Theobald III, Count of Champagne (1197–1201)	Theobald I of Navarre (1201–1253)	Theobald II of Navarre (1253–1270)	Henry I of Navarre (1270–1274)	Joan I of Navarre (1274–1305) with husband Philip IV of France			
	Count of Charolais	Burgundy	Duke of Burgundy		Stephen II of Auxonne (1173–1237)	Hugh IV, Duke of Burgundy (1237–1248)	John of Burgundy (1231–1268) (1248–1267)	Robert, Count of Clermont (1272–1310) by right of his wife Beatrice of Burgundy, Lady of Bourbon				
	Counts of Chartres	Blois & Berry	Kings of France		Louis I, Count of Blois (1191–1205)	Theobald VI, Count of Blois (1205–1218)	Isabelle of Chartres (1218–1248) with husbands Sulpice III of Amboise (1190–1218) and Jean II of Montmirail (1218–1240)	Matilda of Amboise (1248–1256) with husband John III, Count of Soissons (1254–1256)	John I, Count of Blois (1256–1280)	Joan, Countess of Blois (1280–1291)	Charles, Count of Valois (1270–1325)	
	Counts of Chateaudun		Kings of France		Louis I of Blois (1191–1205)	Theobald VI of Blois (1205–1218)	Margaret of Blois (1218–1230) with husband Walter II of Avesnes (1218–1230)	Mary, Countess of Blois (1230–1241) with husband Hugh I, Count of Blois (1230–1241)	John I, Count of Blois (1241–1279)	Joan, Countess of Blois (1279–1292)	Hugh II, Count of Blois (1292–1307)	
	Counts of Clermont-en-Beauvaisis	Vermandois & Ponthieu	Kings of France		Louis I of Blois (1191–1205)	Theobald VI of Blois (1205–1218)	Philip Hurepel (1218–1234)	Alberic (1234-12??)	Jeanne, Countess of Clermont-en-Beauvaisis (12??-1252)	Robert, Count of Clermont (1268–1317)		
	Count of Comminges	Toulouse	Kings of England?		Bernard IV de Comminges (1176–1225)	Bernard V de Comminges (1225–1241)	Bernard VI de Comminges (1241–1295)	Bernard VII de Comminges (1295–1312)				
	Counts of Cosnac											
	Counts of Crehange		Holy Roman Emperors		Burcard of Crehange							
	Counts of Dammartin	Isle de France	Kings of France		Renaud (1200–1214)	Philippe Hurepel (1214–1234)	Afonso III (1235–1259)	Matthieu de Trie (died 1272)(1265–1272)	Jean II de Trie (1272–1302)			
	Counts of Dreux	Isle de France	Kings of France		Robert II, Count of Dreux (1184–1218)	Robert III, Count of Dreux (1218–1234)	John I, Count of Dreux (1234–1249)	Robert IV, Count of Dreux (1249–1282)	John II, Count of Dreux (1282–1309)			
	Counts of Embrun	Dauphin	Dauphin of Viennois		Dauphins of Viennois							
	Counts of Etampes		Kings of France		Royal Domain of Kings of France							
	Counts of Eu	Normandy	Kings of France/Kings of England		Alix, comtesse d'Eu (1191–1245)	Raoul Ier de Lusignan (1191–1219)	Raoul II de Lusignan (1245–1246)	Marie, comtesse d'Eu (1246–1260) avec Alphonse de Brienne (1250–1260)	John I of Brienne, Count of Eu (1270–1294)	John II of Brienne, Count of Eu (1294–1302)		
	Count of Évreux	Normandy	Kings of France		Amaury IV of Évreux (1191–1200)	Royal domain	Louis, Count of Évreux (1298–1319)					
	Counts of Ferrette		Holy Roman Emperors		Frederick II of Ferrette (~1197-1233)	Ulrich II of Ferrette (1233–1275)	Théobald de Ferrette (1275–1316)					
	Counts of Fézensac	Gascony	Kings of England/Kings of France		Géraud IV d'Armagnac (1193–1215)	Gerald V of Armagnac (1215–1219)	Peter Gérard of Armagnac (1219–1241)	Bernard V of Armagnac (1241–1243)	Arnaud Odon of Armagnac (1243–1255)	Gerald VI, Count of Armagnac (1256–1285)	Bernard VI, Count of Armagnac(1285–1319)	
	Counts of Flanders	Flanders	Holy Roman Emperors/Kings of France		Baldwin I, Latin Emperor (1194–1205)	Joan, Countess of Flanders (1205–1244)	Ferdinand, Count of Flanders (1212–1233) as husband of Joan	Thomas, Count of Flanders (1237–1244) as husband of Joan	Margaret II, Countess of Flanders (1244–1278) daughter of Baldwin	William II, Count of Flanders (1247–1251)	Guy, Count of Flanders (1251–1305)	
	Counts of Foix	Toulouse	Counts of Toulouse		Raymond-Roger, Count of Foix (1188–1223)	Roger-Bernard II, Count of Foix (1223–1241)	Roger IV, Count of Foix (1241–1265)	Roger-Bernard III, Count of Foix (1265–1302)				
	Counts of Forcalquier				Bertrand II of Forcalquier (1144–1207)	William IV of Forcalquier (1144–1209)	Garsenda, Countess of Forcalquier (1209–1257)	Counts of Provence				
	Counts of Forez	Burgundy	Dauphin of Viennois		Guigues III of Forez (1199–1203)	Guigues IV of Forez (1203–1241)	Guigues V (VI) (1241–1259)	Renaud (1259–1270)	Guigues VI (VII) 91270-1279)	John I of Forez (1279–1333)		
	Counts of Gatinais	Gatinais	Kings of France		Royal Domain of the Kings of France							
	Counts of Gévaudan	Auvergne	King of France?		Peter II of Aragon (1196–1213)	James I of Aragon (1225–1258)	Louis IX of France (1258–1270)	Royal Domain				
	Counts of Gaure	Toulouse	King of France		Géraud de Cazaubon (~1270)							
	Counts of Gien		Kings of France		Royal Domain of the Kings of France							
	Counts of Grenoble		Holy Roman Emperors		Dauphins of Vienne							
	Counts of Guînes	Normandy	Count of Flanders/King of France		Baldwin II, Count of Guînes (1169–1205)	Arnoul II, Count of Guînes (1205–1220)	Baldwin III, Count of Guînes (1220–1244)	Arnould III, Count of Guînes (1244-)	Baldwin IV, Count of Guînes	John II of Brienne, Count of Eu (1294–1302)		
	Counts of Ivry	Normandy	Kings of France		Royal Domain							
	Counts of Joigny	Champagne	Count of Champagne		Guillaume I of Joigny (1179–1220)	Pierre I of Joigny (1220–1222)	Guillaume II of Joigny (1222–1248)	Guillaume III of Joigny (1248–1261)	Jean I of Joigny (1261–1283	John II Blondell (1283–1324)		
	Counts of La Marche	La Marche	Kings of France		Hugues IX de Lusignan (119-1219)	Hugh X of Lusignan (1219–1249)	Hugues XI de Lusignan (1249–1250)	Hugues XII de Lusignan (1250–1270)	Hugues XIII de Lusignan (1270–1303)	Guy de Lusignan(1303–1308)		
	Counts of Langres		Kings of France		Bishops of Langres							
	Counts of Laon		Kings of France		Bishops of Laon							
	Counts of Longueville	Burgundy	Duke of Burgundy/King of France		William Marshal, 1st Earl of Pembroke	Richard Marshal, 3rd Earl of Pembroke (1220–1239)	Vacant	Enguerrand de Marigny				
	Counts of Louviers		Kings of France		Archbishop of Rouen							
	Counts of Lyons		Holy Roman Emperors		Archbishops of Lyon							
	Counts of Mâcon	Burgundy	Dauphin of Viennois		William IV of Mâcon (1284-1224)	Géraud II of Mâcon (1224)	Alix of Mâcon (1224–1239)	Sold to the crown of France				
	Counts of Maine	Maine	Kings of France		John, King of England (1199–1202)	Royal Domain						
	Count of Mantes		King of France		Royal Domain							
	Counts of Marville				Theobald I, Count of Bar	Henry V, Count of Luxembourg	Henry VI, Count of Luxembourg	Henry VII, Holy Roman Emperor				
	Counts of Meaux		Kings of France		Counts of Champagne							
	Counts of Melgueil				Bishop of Maguelone							
	Counts of Meulan	Ile de France	King of France		Robert de Beaumont, Count of Meulan (1166–1204)	Royal Domain						
	Counts of Melun		King of France		Royal Domain							
	Count of Montbeliard		Holy Roman Emperor		Richard III of Montfaucon (1195–1227)	Thierry III of Montbeliard (1227–1283)	Reginald of Burgundy (1283–1322)					
	Count of Montfort l'Amaury	Ille de France	King of France		Simon de Montfort, 5th Earl of Leicester (1188–1218)	Amaury de Montfort (died 1241) (1218–1241)	John I of Montfort (1241–1249)	Robert IV, Count of Dreux (1260–82)	Beatrice, Countess of Montfort (1282–1312)			
	Counts of Mortain	Normandy	King of France		Ida, Countess of Boulogne (1204–1216)	Matilda II, Countess of Boulogne (1216–1245) with her husbands	Joan, Countess of Ponthieu (1245–1251)	Vacant				
	Counts of Nantes	Brittany	Duchy of Brittany		Arthur I, Duke of Brittany (1196–1203)	Guy of Thouars (1203–1213)	Peter I, Duke of Brittany (1213–1221)	John I, Duke of Brittany (1221–1286)	John II, Duke of Brittany (1286–1305)			
	Counts of Nevers	Nevers	Kings of France		Matilda I, Countess of Nevers (1200–1257)	Hervé IV of Donzy (1200–1222) by right of his wife Matilda	Guigues IV of Forez (1226–1241) by right of his wife Matilda	Matilda II, Countess of Nevers (1257–1262) claim from Yolande I, Countess of Nevers with husband Odo, Count of Nevers (1257–1262)	Yolande II, Countess of Nevers (1262–1280) with husbands John Tristan, Count of Valois (1265–1270), Robert III, Count of Flanders (1272–1280)	Louis I, Count of Nevers (1280–1322)		
	Counts of Orleans	Ile de France	King of France		Royal Domain of the Kings of France							
	Counts of Pardiac		Kings of France/England		Oger II de Astarac (1171–1205)	Guillaume de Astarac (1205–1237)	Bohémond de Astarac (1237–1265)	Marie de Astarac (1265–1312)				
	Counts of Paris	Isle-de-France	Kings of France		Royal Domain of the Kings of France							
	Counts of Penthièvre	Brittany	Duke of Brittany		Alan I de Rennes (1177–1212)	Henry II of Avagour (1212–1230)	Peter I, Duke of Brittany (1230–1237)	Yolande of Brittany (1237–1272)	John I, Duke of Brittany (1272–1286)	John II, Duke of Brittany (1286–1305)		
	Counts of Perche	Maine	King of France		Geoffrey III, Count of Perche (1191–1202)	Thomas, Count of Perche (1202–1217)	William II, Count of Perche (1217–1226)	Jacques de Chateau-Gontier (1226–1257)	Royal Domain	Peter I, Count of Alençon (1268–1283)	Charles, Count of Valois (1286–1305)	
	Counts of Perigord	Aquitaine	Kings of France		Elias V of Périgord (1166–1205)	Archambaud I of Périgord (1205–1212)	Archambaud II of Périgord (1212–1239)	Elias VI of Périgord (1239–1251)	Archambaud III of Périgord (1251–1295)	Elias VII of Périgord (1295–1311)		
	Counts of Petite-Pierre				Bishops of Metz until 1223	Bishops of Strassbourg						
	Counts of Piedmont	Piedmont	Counts of Savoy/Holy Roman Emperor		Thomas I of Savoy (????-1233)	Thomas II of Piedmont (1233–1259)	Thomas III of Piedmont (1259–1282)	Philip I of Piedmont (1282–1334)				
	Counts of Ponthieu	Vermandois & Ponthieu	King of France		William IV, Count of Ponthieu (1191–1221)	Simon, Count of Ponthieu (1221–1239)	Joan, Countess of Ponthieu (1239–1251)	Ferdinand III of Castile (1251–1252)	Joan, Countess of Ponthieu (1252–1279)	Edward I of England (1279–1307 by right of his wife)		
	Counts of Poitou	Poitou	King of France		Richard of Cornwall (1225–1243)	Alphonse, Count of Poitiers (1243–1271)	Philip V of France (1293–1322)					
	Counts of Porcien	Champagne	Count of Champagne		Raoul de Grandpre (1196–1268)	Theobald II of Navarre (1268–1270)	Henry I of Navarre (1270–1274)	Joan I of Navarre (1274–1285)	Philip IV of France (1285–1303)			
	Counts of Portois	Lorraine	Holy Roman Empire		Dukes of Lorranie							
	Counts of Provence	Provence	Holy Roman Empire		Counts of Provence							
	Counts of Quercy	Toulouse	King of France		Counts of Toulouse							
	Counts of Razes	Toulouse	Kings of Aragon/Kings of France		King of Aragon	Roger-Bernard II, Count of Foix (1227)	Royal Domain of the Kings of France					
	Counts of Rethel	Champagne	Count of Champagne		Hugh II, Count of Rethel (1199–1227)	Hugh III, Count of Rethel (1227–1242)	John, Count of Rethel (1242–1251)	Walter, Count of Rethel (1251–1262)	Manasses V, Count of Rethel (1262–1272)	Hugh IV, Count of Rethel (1272–1285)	Joan, Countess of Rethel (1285–1328)	
	Counts of Rennes	Brittany	Duke of Brittany		Dukes of Brittany							
	Counts of Rodez	Toulouse	Count of Toulouse		William, Count of Rodez (1196–1208)	Henry I of Rodez (1208–1221)	Hugh IV of Rodez (1221–1274)	Henry II of Rodez (1274–1304)				
	Counts of Rosnay	Champagne	Count of Champagne		Part of the County of Champagne	Henry I of Navarre (1263–1270) count of Rosnay as appanage						
	Counts of Roucy	Champagne	Counts of Champagne		Enguerrand III, Lord of Coucy (1200–1205, did not die until 1242)	John II, Count of Roucy (1205–1251)	John III, Count of Roucy (1251–1271)	John IV, Count of Roucy (1271–1304)				
	Count of Rourgue	Toulouse	Count of Toulouse		Raymond VI, Count of Toulouse (1194–1222)	Simon de Montfort, 5th Earl of Leicester (1215–1218)	Raymond VII, Count of Toulouse (1222–1249)	Alphonse, Count of Poitiers (1249–1270) by right of his wife Joan, Countess of Toulouse	Royal Domain			
	Counts of Roussillon		King of Aragon		Sancho, Count of Provence (1181–1212)	Nuño Sánchez (1212–1241)	James I of Aragon (1241–1276)	James II of Majorca (1276–1311)				
	Counts of Salm-en-Vosges		Holy Roman Emperors		Henry III of Salm (~1205)	Henri IV of Salm						
	Counts of Sancerre	Blois & Berry	King of France		William I, Count of Sancerre (1191–1217)	Louis I of Sancerre (1217–67)	John I of Sancerre (1267–1284)	Stephen II of Sancerre (1284–1306)				
	Counts of Saintonge	Aquitaine	King of England		Jean, roi d'Angleterre (1199–1214)	Hugh X of Lusignan(1214–1242)	Alphonse, Count of Poitiers (1242–1271)					
	Counts of Senlis		King of France		Royal domain of the Kings of France							
	Counts of Sens		Kings of France		Royal Domain of the Kings of France							
	Count of Soissons	Champagne	Count of Champagne or King of France		Ralph, Count of Soissons (1180–1235)	John II, Count of Soissons (1235–1270)	John III, Count of Soissons (1270–1286)	John IV, Count of Soissons (1286–1289)	John V, Count of Soissons (1289–1304)			
	Counts of Saint-Pol	Artois	King of France/Count of Champagne		Hugh IV, Count of Saint-Pol (1174–1205)	Walter III of Châtillon (1205–1219)	Guy II, Count of Saint-Pol (1223–1226)	Hugh I, Count of Blois (1228–1249)	Guy III, Count of Saint-Pol (1249–1289)	Guy IV, Count of Saint-Pol (1289–1317)		
	Counts of Touraine	Tourranie	King of France		John, King of England	Royal domain of France						
	Counts of Troyes	Champagne	Count of Champagne		Counts of Champagne							
	Counts of Tonnerre	Tonerre	King of France		Peter II of Courtenay (1185–1219)	Matilda I, Countess of Nevers (1219–1257)	Hervé IV of Donzy (1219–1223)	Guigues IV of Forez (1227–1241)	Matilda II, Countess of Nevers (1257–1262)	Odo, Count of Nevers (1267-1266)	Charles I of Anjou (1273–1285)	Margaret of Burgundy, Queen of Sicily (1285–1308)
	Counts of Toul	Lorraine	Holy Roman Emperor		Bishops of Toul							
	Counts of Valois		King of France		Royal Domain of France	John Tristan, Count of Valois (1268–1270)	Royal Domain of France	Charles, Count of Valois (1285–1325)				
	Counts of Vaudemont	Lorraine	Duke of Lorraine		Hugues II Vaudémont	Hugues III of Vaudémont	Henry I of Vaudémont	Renaud of Vaudémont	Henri II of Vaudémont	Henri III of Vaudémont		
	Counts of Venaissin	Toulouse	Pope		Counts of Toulouse	Popes						
	Counts of Vannes	Brittany	Dukes of Brittany		Duke of Brittany							
	Counts of Vermandois		King of France		Royal domain of France							
	Counts of Vertus		Kings of France		Archbishops of Reims	Counts of Champagne	Royal domain of France (1284)					
	Counts of Velay	Auvergne	King of France		Bishops of Le Puy							
	Counts of Vendome	Touraine	King of France		Bouchard IV of Vendôme (1180–1202)	John II of Vendome (1202–1211)	John III of Vendome (1211–1217)	John IV of Vendome (1217–1230)	Peter I of Vendome (1230–1249)	Bouchard V of Vendome (1249–1270)	John V of Vendome (1270–1315)	
	Counts of Vexin	Vexin	Kings of France		Alix of France, Countess of Vexin (1199–1218) and her husband William IV, Count of Ponthieu	King of france?						
	Counts of Vienne		Duke of Burgundy		William IV of Mâcon (1184–1224)	Geraud II of Mâcon (1222–1224)	Alix, Countess of Mâcon (1224–1227)	Henry (I) de Mâcon (1227–1233)	Guillaume (V) de Mâcon (1233–1247)	Hugh of Vienne (1247–1277)	Archbishops of Vienne	
	Count Dauphins of Vienne		Holy Roman Emperors		Dauphins of Vienne							

== Bishops ==
Note: The bishops in bold are marked for their notability, land holdings, and because they had metropolitan powers.

#	Title	Region	1st	2nd	3rd	4th	5th	6th	7th	8th	9th	10th
	Bishops of Agde	Toulouse	Raimond de Montpellier (1192–1213)	Pierre Poulverel (1214)	Thédise (1215–1233)	Bertrand de Saint-Just (1233–1241)	Chrétien (bishop) (1242)	Pierre Raimond de Fabre (1243–1270)	Pierre Bérenger de Montbrun (1271–1296)	Raimond du Puy (1296–1327)		
	Bishops of Albi	Toulouse	Guilelmus Petri (1185–1227)	Durand (bishop) (1228–1254)	Bernard II. de Combret (1254–1271)	Vacant (1271–1276)	Bernard de Castanet (1276–1308)					
	Bishops of Amiens	Vermandois	Thibaud d'Heilly (1169–1204)	Richard de Gerberoy (1204–1210)	Evrard de Fouilloy (1211–1222)	Geoffroy d'Eu (1222–1236)	Arnold (bishop of Amiens) (1236–1247)	Gérard de Conchy (1247–1257)	Aleaume de Neuilly (1258–1259)	Bernard d'Abbeville (bishop) (1259–1278)	Guillaume de Mâcon (1278–1308)	
	Bishops of Angoulême	Aquitaine	John of Saint-Val (1181–1204)	William Testaud (1206–1227)	John Guillot (1228–1238)	Radulfus (bishop of Angouleme) (1240–1247)	Peter (1247–1252)	Robert of Montbron (1252–1268)	Vacant (1268–1272)	Peter Raymond (1272–1273)	William of Blaye(1273–1307)	
	Bishops of Arras	Flanders	Pierre I (Bishop of Arras) (1184–1203)	Raoul de Neuville (1203–1221)	Pontius (1221–1231)	Asso (1231–1245)	Fursaeus (1245–1247)	Jacques de Dinant (1248–1259)	Pierre de Noyon (1259–1280)	Guillaume d'Isy (1282–1293)	Jean Lemoine (1293–1294)	Gérard Pigalotti(1296–1316)
	Bishops of Autun	Burgundy	Walter II (bishop of Autun) (1189–1223)	Guy I. de Vergy (1224–1245)	Anselin de Pomard (1245–1253)	Girard de La Roche (1253–1276)	Jacques I. de Beauvoir (1283–1286)	Hugues d'Arcy (1287–1298)	Barthélémy (1298–1308)			
	**Bishops of Avignon**	Provence	Rostaing IV (1197–1209)	Guillaume I de Montelier (1209–1226)	Nicolas (Bishop of Avignon) (1227–1232)	Bernard I (bishop of Avignon) (1232–1234)	Zoen Tencarari (1240–1261)	Bertrand de Saint-Martin (1261–1268)	Robert II (bishop of Avignon) (1272–1287)	André de Languiscel (1291–1300)		
	**Bishops of Bayeux**	Normandy	Henri (II.) (1163–1205)	Robert des Ablèges (1206–1239)	Thomas de Freauville (1232–1238)	Guy (bishop of bayeaux) (1241–1260)	Eudes de Lory (1263–1274)	Gregory of Naples (1274–1276)	Pierre de Beneis (1276–1306)			
	**Bishops of Beauvais**	Champagne	Philip of Dreux (1175–1217)	Milo of Nanteuil (1217–1234)	Godefrey de Clermont-Nestle (1234–1236)	Robert de Cressonsacq (1237–1248)	Guillaume de Grès (1249–1267)	Renaud de Nanteuil (1267–1283)	Theobald de Nanteuil (1283–1300)			
	Bishops of Belley	Burgundy	Bernard II (1198–1207)	Benoit de Langres (1208)	Bernard de Thoire-Villars (1211–1212)	Boniface de Savoie (1232–1240)	Pierre II (1244–1248)	Jean de Plaisance (1255–1269)	Berlion D'Amisin (1280–1282)	Pierre de La Baume (1287–1298)		
	Bishops of Béziers	Toulouse	Guillaume de Rocozels (1199–1205)	Reginald( Renaud) II de Montpeyroux (1208–1211)	Bernard V de Cuxac (1215–1242)	Raymond III de Salles (1245–1247)	Raymond IV de Vaihauquez (1247–1261)	Pons de Saint Just (1261–1293)	Raymond V de Colombiers (1293–1294)	Berengar Fredol the Elder (1294–1305)		
	Bishops of Carcassonne-Narbonne	Toulouse	Berengar of Barcelona (1191–1212)	Arnaldus Amalric (1212–1225)	Pierre Amiel (1226–1245)	Guillaume de Broue (1245–1257)	Guy de Foulques (1259–1261)	Maurinus (1262–1272)	Pierre de Montbrun (1272–1286)	Gilles I Aycelin de Montaigu (1287–1311)		
	Bishops of Chartres	Blois	Reginald of Bar (bishop of Chartres) (1182–1217)	Gautier (1218–1234)	Hugues de La Ferté (1234–1236)	Aubry Cornut (1236–1244)	Henri de Grez (1244–1246)	Mathieu des Champs (1247–1259)	Pierre de Mincy (1259–1276)	Simon de Perruchay (1277–1297)	Jean de Garlande (bishop) (1298–1315)	
	Bishops of Clermont	Auvergne	Robert of Auvergne(1195–1227)	Hugh of La Tour-du-Pin (1227–1249)	Guy de la Tour (1250–1286)	Aimar de Cros (1286–1297)	Jean Aicelin (1298–1301)					
	Bishops of Coutances	Normandy	Guillaume de Tournebu (1184–1202)	Vivien de L'Étang (1202–1208)	Hugues de Morville (1208–1238)	Gilles de Caen (1246–1248)	Jean d'Essay (1251–1274)	Eustache, O.Min (1282–1291)	Robert de Harcourt (1291–1315)			
	Bishops of Dol	Brittany	Jean VI. de Lizaunet (1200–1231)	Clément de Coetquen (1231–1242)	Etienne I (1242–1265)	Jean VII. Mahé (1266–1279)	Thibaud I. de Pouencé (1280–1301)					
	Bishops of Évreux	Normandy	Robert de Roye (1201–1203)	Lucas (1203–1220)	Raoul de Cierrey (1220–1223)	Richard de Bellevue (1223–1236)	Raoul de Cierrey (1236–1243)	Jean de La Cour d'Aubergenville(1244–1256)	Raoul de Grosparmi(1259–1263)	Raoul de Chevry (1263–1269)	Philippe de Chaourse(1270–1281)	Nicolas d'Auteuil(1281–1298)
	**Count-Bishops of Langres**	Burgundy	Hutin de Vandeuvre (1200–1205)	Robert de Châtillon (1205–1210)	Guillaume de Joinville (1210–1220)	Hugues de Montréal (1200–1236)	Robert de Torote (1236–1242)	Hugues de Rochecorbon (1242–1250)	Guy de Rochefort (1250–1266)	Guy de Genève (1266–1291)	Jean de Rochefort (1294–1305)	
	Bishops of Lectoure	Aquitaine										
	Bishops of Le Mans	Maine										
	**Count-Bishops of Le Puy-en-Velay**	Auvergne										
	**Bishops of Limoges**	Limoges	Jean de Veyrac (1198–1218)	Bernard de Savène (1219–1226)	Guy de Cluzel (1226–1235)	Durand, Bishop of Limoges (1240–1245)	Aymeric de La Serre (1246–1272)	Gilbert de Malemort (1275–1294)	Regnaud de La Porte (1294–1316)			
	Bishops of Lisieux	Normandy										
	Bishops of Lodève	Toulouse										
	Bishops of Mâcon	Nevers?										
	Bishops of Meaux	Ile de France										
	Bishops of Mende	Toulouse										
	Bishops of Montpellier	Toulouse										
	**Bishops of Nevers**	Nevers										
	Bishops of Nimes	Toulouse										
	Bishops of Noyon	Vermandois										
	Bishops of Orleans	Ile de France										
	**Bishops of Paris**	Ile de France	Odo de Sully (1196–1208)	Pierre de La Chapelle (Peter of Nemours) (1208–1219)	Guillaume de Seignelay (1220–1223)	Barthélmy (1224–1227)	William of Auvergne, Bishop of Paris (1228–1249)	Renaud Mignon de Corbeil (1250–1268)	Étienne Tempier (1268–1279)	Renaud de Hombliéres (1280–1288)	Simon Matifort (Matifardi) (1290–1304)	
	**Bishops of Périgueux**	Périgord										
	Bishops of Perpignan-Elne	Barcelona										
	**Bishops of Poitiers**	Poitou										
	Bishops of Quimper	Brittany										
	Bishop of Saintes	Aquitaine										
	Bishops of Saint-Brieuc	Brittany										
	Bishops of Saint-Malo	Brittany										
	Bishops of Séez	Normandy										
	Bishops of Senlis	Champagne										
	Bishops of Soissons	Vermandois										
	Bishops of Thérouanne	Flanders										
	Bishops of Tournai	Flanders										
	Bishops of Tréguier	Brittany										
	Bishops of Troyes	Champagne										
	Bishops of Uzès	Provence										

== Viscounts/Vidames ==
Viscounts under the king of France or a domestic vassal.

#	Title	Liege-Lord	Coat of Arms	1st	2nd	3rd	4th	5th	6th	7th	8th
	Viscounts of Arques	King of France									
1	Viscount of Avranches	Dukes of Normandy?		Ranulf de Blondeville, 6th Earl of Chester (1181–1204)	Richard de Presles (1204–1230)	Robert de Presles (1230–1236)	9 viscounts succeeded without being named				
2	Viscounts of Beaumont-au-Maine	Counts of Maine or Kings of France		Raoul VIII of Beaumont-au-Maine (1199–1239)	Richard II of Beaumont-au-Maine (1239–1249)	Louis of Brienne (1249–1297, Also lord of Acre and a Prince of Jerusalem) With wife Agnès of Beaumont-au-Maine (1249–1301)					
3	Viscounts of Beu	Kings of France?		Robert III of Dreux	Robert I of Beu (1234–1281)	Robert II of Beu (1281–1306)					
4	Viscounts of Blois	Counts of Blois		Robert de Lisle, Viscount of Blois (~1145- after 1166)	Renaud, Viscount of Blois with his brother Geoffrey (after 1166 – after 1214)	Renaud II, Viscount of Blois (after 1214–1277)					
5	Viscounts of Brosse	Kings of France?		Bernard IV Viscount of Brosse (1199–1222)	Géraud II Viscount of Brosse (1222–1239)	Hugues I Viscount of Brosse (1239–1274)	Hugh II Viscount of Brosse (1274–1297)				
6	Viscounts of Caen (by appointment)	Dukes of Normandy/Kings of France		Robert de Vieuxpont(1200–1204)	Guillaume Quarel (1204–1246)	Jean Pigache (1246–1271)	Robert de Villers (1271–1285)	Henry de Rie (1285–1293)	Guy de Gripéel (1293–1299)	Henry de Rie (1299–1303)	
7	Viscount of Carentan (by appointment)	Kings of France		Alexandre Viart (1286–????)							
8	Viscounts of Carlat	Kings of France?		Hugh II of Rodez (1159–1208)	Henry I of Rodez (1208–1221)	Hugh IV of Rodez (1221–1274)	Henry II of Rodez (1274–1304)				
9	Viscounts of Châteaudun	Kings of France		Geoffrey V (1191–1218)	Geoffrey VI (1218–1250)	Clemence (1250–1259)	Robert I of Beu (1259–1281)	Alix de Dreux with her husband Raoul II of Clermont (1281–1302)			
10	Viscounts of Comborn	Kings of France?		Archambaud VI de Comborn (1176–1238)	Bernard II de Comborn (1238–1263)	Archambaud VII de Comborn (1263–1278)	Guy de Comborn (1278–1298)				
	Viscounts of Corbeil	Kings of France									
11	Viscounts of Creyssel	King of France/Counts of Toulouse		Raymond I of Roquefeuil (1180–1204)	Raymond II of Roquefeuil (1204–1229)	Hugh IV of Rodez (1221–1274)	Henry II of Rodez (1274–1304)				
12	Viscount of l'Eau/Rouen	Dukes of Normandy/Kings of France		Laurent du Donjon (...C.1200-1204)Vicomté de l'Eau							
13	Viscount of Limoges	Kings of France/Bishops of Périgueux		Guy V, Viscount of Limoges (1199–1230)	Guy VI of Limoges (1230–1263)	Marie of Limoges (1263–1275)	Arthur II, Duke of Brittany (1275–1312)				
14	Viscounts of Melun	King of France		Adam II of Melun ~1200-1217	Viscount Adam III de Melun ~1217-1250	Viscount Guillaume IV de Melun ~1250-1278	Adam IV Melun (1278–1304)				
15	Viscounts of Millau	Kings of France?		Peter II of Aragon (1196–1213)	James I of Aragon (1225–1258)	Louis IX of France (1258–1270)	Royal Domain				
	Viscounts of Paris										
	Viscounts of Polignac	Kings of France?		Pons IV de Polignac (1209)							
	Viscounts of Roncheville	Kings of France/Dukes of Normandy		Robert VI Bertran de Bricquebec (~1240-1272)	Robert VII Bertrand de Bricquebec (1272–1290)	Robert VIII Bertrand de Bricquebec (1290–1348)					
16	Viscounts of Saint-Saveur	Kings of France		Tesson Family	Richard, Baron of Harcourt (1208–1242)	Jean I of Harcourt (1242–1288)					
	Viscounts of Sens	Kings of France		Galeran (~1200)	Hermensent	Héloïse	Split between different heirs				
17	Viscount of Thiers	Kings of France or Counts of Auvergne		Guy VI of Thiers (until 1236)	Guy VII de Thiers						
18	Viscounts of Turenne	Kings of France		Raymond III de Turenne (1191–1212)	Raymond IV de Turenne (1212–1243)	Alix de Turenne (1243–1247)	Raymond V de Turenne (1247–1316)				
19	Viscounts of Ventadour	Kings of France		Ebles IV de Ventadour (1170–1214)	Ebles V de Ventadour (1214–1236)	Ebles VI de Ventadour (1236–1265)	Ebles VII de Ventadour (1265–1297)	Hélie de Ventadour (1297–1328)			

Of Toulouse - Until Alphonse, Count of Poitiers became Count of Toulouse in 1249, the County of Toulouse was a powerful vassal of France which was almost independent of France. Within this large county (which also consisted of the duchy of Narbonne and the March of Provence) there were at least 11 viscounts who were vassals of the counts, one of the rare cases where the term viscount makes sense intuitively in the 13th century. However with the Albigensian Crusade many of the viscounts lost their land to the crusaders most notably Simon de Montfort, 5th Earl of Leicester, some gained their lands back, others did not.

Viscounts in the County of Toulouse
Number	Title	Coat of Arms	1st	2nd	3rd	4th	5th	6th	7th	8th
1	Viscounts of Agde		Bernard Ato VI (1163–1214)	Simon de Montfort, 5th Earl of Leicester (1214-12??)						
2	Viscounts of Albi		Raymond Roger Trencavel (1194–1209)	Bernard Ato VI (1209–1215)	Raymond II Trencavel (1215–1263/7)					
3	Viscounts of Beziers		Raymond Roger Trencavel (1194–1209)	Simon de Montfort, 5th Earl of Leicester (1209–1218)	Raymond II Trencavel (1215–1263/67)					
4	Viscounts of Carcassonne		Raymond Roger Trencavel (1194–1209)	Simon de Montfort, 5th Earl of Leicester (1209–1218)	Raymond II Trencavel (1215–1263/67)					
5	Viscounts of Fenouillèdes		Pierre IV of Fenouillet (1179–1209)	Pierre V of Fenouillet (1209–1226)	Nuño Sánchez (1226–1242)	Chabert of Barbeira (1248–1255)	Hugues of Fenouillet (1255–1261)			
6	Viscounts of Narbonne		Pedro Manrique de Lara (1192–1202)	Aimery III of Narbonne (1202–1239)	Amalric I of Narbonne (1239–1270)	Aimery IV of Narbonne (1270–1298)	Amalric II of Narbonne (1298–1328)			
7	Viscounts of Nimes		Bernard Ato VI (1159–1214)	Simon de Montfort, 5th Earl of Leicester (1214–1218)	Amaury de Montfort (died 1241) (1218–1224)	Ceded to the King of France				
8	Viscounts of Razes		Raymond Roger Trencavel (1185–1209)	Simon de Montfort, 5th Earl of Leicester (1209–1218)	Seneschalship of Carcassonne under the King of France (1218–1224)	Raymond II Trencavel (1224–1227, and 1240–1247)	Seneschalship of Carcassonne under the King of France (1227–1240, 1247 onward)			
9	Viscounts of Lautrec		Frotard III of Lautrec (1194–1219)	Bertrand I of Lautrec (1219–1258) with his brother Sicard VI of Lautrec (1219–1235)	Sicard VI of Lautrec (1258–1277)	Bertrand III of Lautrec (1277–1306)				
10	Viscounts of Saint-Antonin		Baldwin of Toulouse (before 1213)	Bernard-Hugues de Lautrec (before 1250)	Ceded to the King of France					
11	Viscounts of Ventadour		Ebles IV de Ventadour (1170–1214)	Ebles V de Ventadour (1214–1236)	Ebles VI de Ventadour (1236–1265)	Ebles VII de Ventadour (1265–1297)	Hélie de Ventadour (1297–1328)			
12	Viscounts of Ayssènes		Déodat of Caylus (1182–1250)							

The Duchy of Brittany was perhaps the feudal state with the most independence from France in the 13th century and it had several viscounts.

Number	Title	Coat of Arms	1st	2nd	3rd	4th	5th	6th	7th	8th
1	Viscounts of Donges		Roard III de Donges (1175–1219)	Emma de Donges with husband Thibaut I of Rochefort (1240–1271)	Guillaume I of Rochefort (1271–1275)	Thibault II de Rochefort (1275–1327)				
2	Viscounts of Léon		Guihomar V, Viscount of Léon (1179–1216)	Conan I, Viscount of Léon (1216–1231)	Guihomar VI, Viscount of Léon (1231–1239)	Harvey III, Viscount of Léon (1239–1265)	Harvey IV, Viscount of Léon (1265–1298)			
3	Viscounts of Porhoët		Eudon III de Porhoët (1168–1231)	Mahaut Vicomtesse de Porhoet (1231–1234)	Raoul III of Fougères (1234–1254)	Hugues XII de Lusignan (1254–1270)	Hugh XIII of Lusignan (1270–1303)	Guy de Lusignan (1303–1308)		
4	Viscounts of Rohan		Geoffrey of Rohan (1190–1221)	Olivier I of Rohan (1221–1228)	Alain V of Rohan (1228–1242)	Alain VI of Rohan (1242–1304)				
5	Viscount of Tonquédec		Geslin de Coëtmen (d. after 1239)	Alain de Coëtmen (living 1260)	Prigent de Coëtmen (living 1270)	Rolland de Coëtmen (d. 1311)				
6	Viscount of Rennes		Andrew II, Baron of Vitré (1173–1211)	Andrew III, Baron of Vitré (1211–1250)	André IV of Vitré (1250–1251)	Philippa of Vitré (1251–1254)	Guy VII de Laval (1254–1267)	Guy VIII de Laval (1267–1295)	Guy IX de Laval (1295–1333)	

Duchy of Aquitaine/King of England had several viscounts under his control in the 13th century. Many of the viscounties were dependent on the king of England's diplomacy with the ruling family of the given viscounty. In Particular Bearn (and Brulhois) was almost an independent state which preferred to honor its de jure vassalage to England (as the duke of Aquitaine) rather than to the King of France who would be a far more imposing overlord due to his proximity. As such Bearn was not always 100% cooperative.

Number	Title	Coat of Arms	1st	2nd	3rd	4th	5th	6th	7th	8th	9th
1	Viscounts of Bearn		Gaston VI, Viscount of Béarn (1173–1215)	Guillem Ramon I of Montcada (1215–1223)	Guillem II of Montcada (1223–1229)	Gaston VII of Montcada (1229–1290)	Roger-Bernard III, Count of Foix (1290–1302)				
2	Viscount of Bezaume/Benauges		Peter II de Bezaume (~1195-1238)	Bernard II de Bezaume (1238–1253)	Edward I of England (1253–1307)						
3	Viscounts of Brulhois		Gaston VI, Viscount of Béarn (1173–1215)	Guillem Ramon I of Montcada (1215–1223)	Guillem II of Montcada (1223–1229)	Gaston VII of Montcada (1229–1290)	Roger-Bernard III, Count of Foix (1290–1302)				
4	Viscount of Castillon-la-Bataille										
5	Viscounts of Châtellerault		Hugues III, Viscount of Châtellerault (1188–1203)	Hugues de Surgères (1204–1211, sous le nom de Baillif)	Raoul Ier de Lusignan (1212–1218, sous le nom de Baillif)	Aimeri II de Châtellerault (1218–1221, as Baillif)	Clémence de Châtellerault avec Geoffroy II de Lusignan (1224–1239)	Aimeri II de Châtellerault (1239–1242)	John I de Châtellerault (1242–1290)	Jeanne de Châtellerault (1290–1315)	
	Viscounts of Lavedan		Raimond Garcie II	Raimond-Garcie III	Peregrine II (viscount)	Raimond Garcie IV	Arnaud II (viscount)				
6	Viscounts of Lomagne		Vezian II de Lomagne (cited 1204–1221)	Odon V de Lomagne (Cited 1238)	Arnaud Odon d'Armagnac (d. 1267)	Vezian III de Lomagne (1267–1280)	Philippa de Lomagne (1280–1286)	Hélie IX of Périgord (1286–1311) by right of his wife			
7	Viscounts of Rochechouart		Aiméry VI de Rochechouart (1170–1230)	Aimery VII de Rochechouart (1230–1243)	Aiméry VIII de Rochechouart (1243–1245)	Aimery IX de Rochechouart(1245–1288)	Aimery XI de Rochechouart (1288–1306)				
8	Viscount of Sault/Lab										
9	Viscounts of Soule		Raimond-Guillaume II (1178–1200)	Raimond-Guillaume III (1200-12??)	Raimond-Guillaume IV (12??-1237)	Raimond-Guillaume V (1237–1257)	Auger II (1257–1307)				
10	Viscounts of Tartas										
11	Viscounts of Thouars		Aimery VII of Thouars (1173–1226)	Hugues I of Thouars (1226–1229)	Raymond I of Thouars (1229–1233)	Guy I of Thouars (1233–1242)	Aimery VIII of Thouars (1242–1246)	Aimery IX of Thouars (1246–1256)	Renaud I of Thouars (1256–1269)	Savary IV of Thouars (1269–1274)	Guy II of Thouars (1274–1308)
12	Viscount of Aulnay										
13	Viscounts of Fézensaguet		Gerald V of Armagnac (1200–1219)	Roger de Fézensaguet (1219–1245)	Gerald VI, Count of Armagnac (1245–1285)	Gaston d'Armagnac (1285–1320)					

The Count of Champagne had viscounts in his county (which was quite independent of France, but whose interests were generally the same in the 13th century).

Number	Title	Coat of Arms	1st	2nd	3rd	4th	5th	6th	7th	8th
1	Viscounts of Saint Florentin		de Châtillon (1212)	Gaucher (1228–1247)	Geoffrey of Saint-Florentin (1300)					
1	Viscounts of Troyes		Guy II of Dampierre (1174–1216)	William II of Dampierre (1216–1241)	Jean I of Dampierre (1241–1260)	Eustache de Conflans (1260–1263) obtained a third of the viscounty				
3	Viscounts of Meaux		Jean de Montmirail (until 1217)	Mathieu of Montmirail (1217–1262)	Mary de Montmirail (1262–1264)	Enguerrand IV de Coucy (1264–1310)				
4	Viscounts of Avallon		Guy II of Montreal, Lord of Beauvoir (d. 1241)	Hugh, viscount of Avallon (d. 1288)						

The Duchy of Burgundy was a semi independent state which had viscounts. In 1233 William de Champlitte sent a letter to the King of England giving credence for William de Monieriis, possibly acting on behalf of the Duke of Burgundy.

Number	Title	Coat of Arms	1st	2nd	3rd	4th
1	Viscount of Dijon		Eudes de Champlitte, II (1187–1204)	William of Champlitte (1204–1209)	William de Champlitte (...1233...)	
2	Viscount of Vesoul		Gilbert IV of Faucogney (1230)	Jean I of Faucogney (1256)	Ayme (1262)	Héloïse of Joinville (1285–1312)

The Counts of Provence who were part of the Holy Roman Empire (and had not fealty at all to the kingdom of France) had at least one viscount.

Number	Title	Coat of Arms	1st	2nd	3rd
1	Viscount of Marseille		Hugh III de Baux (1181–1240)	Barral of Baux (1240–1268)	Bertrand III of Baux (1268–1305)

The Counts of Rodez who were also viscounts of Carlat had a vassal viscount the viscount of Murat

Number	Title	Coat of arms	1st	2nd	3rd	4th
1	Viscount of Murat		Pierre II de Murat (1205–1239)	Pierre III de Murat (1239–1270)	Pierre IV de Murat (1270–1273)	Guillaume III de Murat (1273–1304)

#	Title	Liege-Lord	Coat of Arms	1st	2nd	3rd	4th	5th	6th
1	Vidamé of Beauvais	Bishop of Beauvais		Philippe of Beauvis De Dreux (1188–1217)					
2	Vidamé of Chartres	Bishop of Chartres		Guillaume de Ferrières (1180–1204)	Geoffroy de Meslay (1204–1245)	Guillaume de Meslay IV (1245–1249)	Guillaume de Meslay V (1249–1321)		
2	Vidamé of Laon	Bishop of Laon		Gérard II de Clacy	Gérard III de Clacy	Baudouin de Clacy	Baudouin de Clacy, Vidame de Laon		
3	Vidamé of Normandy								
4	Vidamé of Reims	Archbishop of Reims							
5	Vidame of Chalons	Bishop of Chalons		Hugues III de Châlons (1183–1269)					
6	Vidames d'Amiens/Picquigny	Bishop of Amiens		Guermond de Picquigny (1178–1206)	Enguerrand de Picquigny (1206–1224)	Gérard de Picquigny (1224–1248)	Jean de Picquigny (1248–1304)		
7	Vidame of Angers	Bishop of Angers							
8	Vidame of Bugey	Bishop of Belley							

== Great Lords/Princes/Barons ==
#	Title	Leigelord	Coat of arms	1st	2nd	3rd	4th	5th	6th	7th	8th	9th
1	Lords of Bourbon	King of France		Guy II of Dampierre (1196–1216) by right of his wife Mathilde of Bourbon	Archambaud VIII of Bourbon (1216–1242)	Archambaud IX of Bourbon (1242–1249)	Odo, Count of Nevers (1249–1266) by right of his wife Matilda II, Countess of Nevers	John of Burgundy (1231–1268) (1266–1268) by right of his wife Agnes of Dampierre	Agnes of Dampierre (1268–1288)	Robert, Count of Clermont (1288–1310) by right of his wife Beatrice of Burgundy, Lady of Bourbon		
	Lords of Gap	Dauphin of Viennois		Bishops of Gap								
2	Prince of Déols and lord of Châteauroux	King of France		Denise de Déols (1173–1207)	William de Chauvigny (1207–1233)	William II de Chauvigny (1233–1270)	Attached to royal Domain					
3	Prince of Dombes and Lord of Beaujeu	King of France		Guichard IV of Beaujeu (1189–1216)	Humbert V de Beaujeu (1216–1250)	Guichard V de Beaujeu (1250–1265)	Renaud I of Forez (1265–1270)	Louis Ier de Beaujeu (1270–1295)	Guichard VI de Beaujeu (1295–1331)			
4	Prince/Lord of Yvetot	None		Richard d'Yvetot (1175–1234)	Richard d'Yvetot II (1234–1276)	Jean II d'Yvetot(1276–1297)	Jean III d'Yvetot (1297–1352)					
	Lord/Prince of Antibes	Count of Provence/Holy Roman Emperor		Isnard de Grasse (~1208)	Raimbaud III of Grasse (~1235)	Isnard II of Grasse (~1270)	Isnard II of Grasse (d.1349)					
	Comptor of Nant	King of France		Raymond I of Roquefeuil (1180–1204)	Arnaud I of Roquefeuil (1204–1241)	Raymond III of Roquefeuil (1241–1281)	Raymond IV of Roquefeuil (1281–1319)					
	Comptor of Apchon			Guillaume II of Apchon(d. 1298)								
	Comptor of Nonette											
	Comptor of Saignes											
	Comptor of Dienne											
	Comptor of Giou-de-Mamou											
	Comptor of Valrus											
	Comptor of Saint-Nectaire			Louis de Saint-Nectaire (~1231)	Bertrand de Saint-Nectaire (1296)							
	Comptor of Aubière											
	Comptor of Terrasson											
	Comptor of Caboet											
	Comptor of Lauancia											
	Comptor of Claviers											
	Comptor of Montferrand											
	Lord of the Royal lands of Auvergne	King of France		Guy II of Auvergne (1199–1222)	Royal Domain of France	Alphonse, Count of Poitiers (1225–1271)	Royal Domain of France					
	Prince/Lord of Chalais			Olivier de Chalais (1182–1214)	Hélie Talleyrand (second half of the 13th century) by right of his wife Agnes of Chalais							
	Lord of Dampierre	Counts of Champagne		Guy II of Dampierre (1174–1216)	William II of Dampierre (1216–1231)	William II, Count of Flanders (1231–1251)						
5	Lords of Montaigu	King of England		Brient II de Montaigu (~1218)	Hugues de Thouars (until 1229) by right of his wife	Peter I, Duke of Brittany (until 1241) by right of his wife	Maurice III (1250–1277)	Maurice IV de Montaigu				
6	Lords of Lusignan	King of England/King of France		Hugues IX de Lusignan (1171–1219)	Hugh X of Lusignan (124619249)	Hugh XI of Lusignan (1249–1250)	Hugh XII of Lusignan (1250–1270)	Hugues XIII de Lusignan (1270–1303)	Guy Ier de Lusignan (1303–1308)			
7	Lords of La Rochefoucauld			Foucauld II de La Roche (1230-)	Guy V de La Rochefoucauld (d. after 1250)	Aimeri I de La Rochefoucauld (retired 1295)	Guy VI de La Rochefoucauld					
8	Captal de Buch			Pierre IV of Bordeaux (1250–1274)	Pierre-Amanieu of Bordeaux (1274–1300)							
9	Baron of Blaye			Rudel Family								
10	Lord of Coucy			Enguerrand III, Lord of Coucy (1191–1242)	Raoul II, Lord of Coucy (1242–1250)	Enguerrand IV de Coucy (1250–1311)						
	Barons of Châteaubriant	Duke of Brittany		Geoffroy III de Châteaubriant (1150–1206)	Geoffrey IV of Châteaubriant (1206–1233)	Geoffrey V of Châteaubriant (1233–1263)	Sibille de Châteaubriant	Geoffrey VI of Châteaubriant (1263–1284)	Geoffrey VII of Chateaubriant(1284–1301)			
11	Dauphin of Auvergne			Dalfi d'Alvernha (1169–1235), sometimes referred to as Robert IV Dauphin of Auvergne	William VIII Dauphin of Auvergne (1235–1240)	Robert I Dauphin (1240–1262)	Robert II Dauphin (1262–1282)	Robert III Dauphin (1282–1324)				
12	Lord of Bauge and Bresse			Ulrich II de Bauge (1180–1220)	Renaud IV de Bauge (1220–1250)	Guy II de Bresse (1250–1269)	Sybille of Bâgé (1269–1272)	Amadeus V, Count of Savoy (1272–1323)				
13	Lord of Jaligny			Hugues IV d'Amboise (1170–1218)	Hugh I de Chatillon (-1268)	Hugh II of Châtillon-Jaligny (1268–1296)	Robert III Dauphin (1296–1324)					
14	Lords of Dinan			Oliver III de de Dinan (1179–1209)	Alain de Beaufort (-1246)	Alain II of Avaugour (1246–1264)	Sold to the Duke of Brittany					
15	Barons of Joinville			Geoffrey V of Joinville (1190–1204)	Simon of Joinville (1204–1233)	Jean de Joinville (1233–1317)						
16	Baron of Montmorency			Matthew II of Montmorency (1189–1230)	Bouchard VI de Montmorency (1230–1243)	Matthew III of Montmorency (1243–1270)	Matthew IV of Montmorency (1270–1304)					
17	Barons of Harcourt			Robert II of Harcourt (1124–1212)	Richard, Baron of Harcourt (1212–1239)	John I of Harcourt (1239–1288)	John II of Harcourt (1288–1302)					
18	Barons of Albret			Amanieu IV d'Albret (1162–1209)	Amanieu V d'Albret (1209–1255)	Amanieu VI d'Albret (1255–1272)	Bernard-Ezy IV d'Albret (1272–1298)	Amanieu VII d'Albret (1298–1326)				
19	Baron of Etampes			Royal Domain	Louis, Count of Évreux (1198–1319)							
20	Lord of Gramont			Vivian II	Raymond Brun II	Arnaud Guillaume I	Arnaud Guillaume II	Arnaud Guillaume III	Raymond Brun III			
	Lords of Grignan											
	Lords of Guise			Walter II of Avesnes (1185–1244)	John I, Count of Blois (1244–1280)	Joan, Countess of Blois (1280–1291)	Hugh II, Count of Blois (1291–1307)					
	Lords of L'Isle-Jourdain			Jordan III de L'isle-Jourdain (1196–1205)	Bernard II Jourdain (1205–1228)	Bernard III de L'Isle-Jourdain(1228–1240)	Jordan IV of L'Isle-Jourdain(1240–1271)	Jordan V de L'Isle Jourdain (1271–1306)				
	Lords of Brionne			Royal Domain	Jean II of Harcourt (1286–1302)							
	Lords of Chateau-Chinon			Hugues II de Blain (1177–1208)	Hugues III de Lormes (1208–1240)	Dreux V of Mello (1240–1249)						
	Lords of Coligny											
	Lords of Flers											
	Barons of Laval			Guy V de Laval (d. 1210)	Emma de Laval (1210–1264)	Robert I, Count of Alençon (1214–1217)	Matthew II of Montmorency (1217–1230)	Guy VII de Laval (1230–67)	Guy VIII de Laval (1267–1295)	Guy IX de Laval (1295–1333)		
	Lords of Lords of Sexfontaines	Count of Champagne		Simon II of Sexfontaines (1172–1232)	Simon III of Sexfontaines (1232–1241)	Simon IV of Sexfontaines (1241–1265)	Guy de Sexfontaines (1265–1304)					
	Lords of Montbron											
	Lords of Montsaugeon	Duke of Burgundy										
	Lords of Ribeaupierre	Holy Roman Emperor										
	Lords of Tancarville	King of France		Josselin I of La Roche-Bernard	Alain I of La Roche-Bernard	Josselin II de La Roche-Bernard (d.1266)	Guillaume II de La Roche-Bernard (d. 1267)	Alain II de La Roche-Bernard	Eudon or Eon I de La Roche-Bernard (d. 1302)			
	Barons of Retz	Dukes of Brittany		Harscoët III of Retz (1162–1207)	Garsire III of Retz (1207–1225)	Raoul III of Retz (1225–1252)	Eustachie de Retz (1252–1265)	Gerard de Chabot (1264)	Gerard II de Chabot (1265–1298)	Gerard III de Chabot (1298–1338)		
	Barons of Ancenis	Dukes of Brittany		Geoffrey II of Ancenis (1202–1227)	Geoffrey III of Ancenis (1227–1248)	Geoffrey IV of Ancenis (1248–1285)	Geoffrey V of Ancenis (1285–1315)					
	Barons of Pontchâteau	Dukes of Brittany		Eudes de Pontchâteau (1165–1200)	Constance de Pontchateau (1200–1263) with her husband William de Clisson (1200–1225)	Olivier I de Clisson	Olivier II de Clisson (1262–1307)					
	Barons of Pont-l'Abbé	Dukes of Brittany		Eudon I of Pont-L'Abbé	Hervé I of Pont-L'Abbé (d 1233)	Hervé II du Pont-L'Abbé	Hervé III du Pont (b. 1240)					
	Barons of Vitre	Dukes of Brittany		Andrew II, Baron of Vitré (1173–1211)	Andrew III, Baron of Vitré (1211–1250)	André IV of Vitré (1250–1251)	Philippa of Vitré (1251–1254)	Guy VII de Laval (1254–1267)	Guy VIII de Laval (1267–1295)	Guy IX de Laval (1295–1333)		
	Barons of Fougeres			Geoffroy of Fougères (1196–1212)	Raoul III of Fougères (1212–1256)	Jeanne de Fougères, Countess of La Marche and of Angoulême (1256–1273), married to Hugh XII of Lusignan	Hugh XIII of Lusignan (1273–1303)	Guy of Lusignan, Count of Angoulême (1303–1308)				
	Lords of Beaumont-Gâtinais			Adam II of Beaumont-Gâtinais (1191–1242)	Jean Guillaume of Beaumont (1242–1257)	Guillaume of Beaumont-Gâtinais (1257–1269)	Isabelle of Beaumont-Gâtinais (1269–1272)	Guy VIII of Laval (1272–1295)	Guy IX de Laval (1295–1330)			
	Lords of Broyes			Simon II of Broyes-Commercy (1199–1208)	Hugues IV de Broyes (1208–1223)	Hugues V de Broyes	Thibaut de Broyes					
	Lords of Mayenne			Juhel III of Mayenne (1170–1220)	Alain II of Avaugour (1220–1267)	Henri III of Avaugour (1267–1301)						
	Lords of Talmont	Kings of England/Kings of France		William of Mauleon (1200–1214)	Savari de Mauléon (1214–1233)	Louis IX of France (1233–1245)	Raoul IV de Mauléon (1245–1253)	Aimery IX of Thouars (1253–1256)	Renaud I of Thouars (1256–1268)			
	Baron of Canillac	Kings of France										
	Lord of Estouteville/Valmont	Kings of France/Dukes of Normandy		Henri I de Estouteville (1186–1232)	Jean I de Estouteville (1232–1262)	Robert IV de Estouteville (1262–1300)						
	Lords of Joyeuse	Kings of France		Bernard d'Anduze (Before 1248)	Guy II de Châteauneuf (after 1248)							
	Lords of Nemours	Kings of France		Gauthier II de Villebéon (1191–1222)	Philippe II de Villebéon (1222–1255)	Gauthier III de Villebéon (1255–1270)	Philippe III de Villebéon (1270–1274)	Royal Domain				
	Lords of Elbeuf	Kings of France		Robert II of Harcourt(1204–1212)	Richard, Baron of Harcourt (1212–1242)	Jean I of Harcourt (1242–1265)	Jean II of Harcourt (1265–1302)					
	Lords of Mercœur	Kings of France		Beraud de Mercœur (1200–1208)	Beraud VIII de Mercœur (1208–1249)	Béraud IX de Mercœur (1249–1275)	Béraud X de Mercœur (1275–1321)					
	Lords of Beaujeu	Kings of France		Guichard IV of Beaujeu (1189–1216)	Humbert V de Beaujeu (1216–1250)	Guichard V (VI) of Beaujeu (1250–1265)	Isabelle de Beaujeu (1265–1297)	Renaud I of Forez (1265–1270)	Louis I of Beaujeu (1270–1295)	Guichard VI (VII) the Great (1295–1331)		
	Lords of Arcis	Count of Champagne		John II of Arcis (1191–1219)	Guy of Arcis (1219–1252)	Jean III of Arcis (1252–1273)	Jean IV of Arcis (1273–1307)					
	Lords of Clefmont	Count of Champagne		Simon IV of Clefmont (1190–1239)	Simon V of Clefmont (1239-12??)	Simon VI of Clefmont (12??-1287)	Ferry I of Clefmont (1287–1302)					
	Lords of Montargis	Kings of France		Kings of France								
	Barons of Bricquebec	Kings of France		Robert III Bertran of Bricquebec (1174–1226)	Robert IV Bertran of Bircquebec (1226–1242)	Robert VI Bertran of Bircquebec (1242–1272)	Robert VII Bertrand of Birquebec (1272–1290)	Robert VIII Bertrand de Bricquebec (1290–1348)				
	Lords of Faucigny	Counts of Savoy										
	Lords of Castellane	Counts of Provence		Boniface IV de Castellane (~1226)	Boniface V de Castellane (d. 1247)							
	Lords of Choiseul	Counts of Champagne		Renard II of Choiseul (1198–1239)	John I of Choiseul (1239–1309)							
	Lords of Bauffremont	Holy Roman Emperor/Dukes of Lorraine										
	Lords of Montélimar	Dauphin of Vienne										
	Lords of Cadaillac	Count of Quercy/Rouergue		Hugues II de Cardaillac (1190–1229)	Bertrand II de Cardaillac (1229–1250)	Hugues III de Cardaillac (1250–1259)	Bertrand III de Cardaillac (1259–1282)	Bertrand IV de Cardaillac (1282–1329)				
	Lords of Caylus	Count of Rouergue		Déodat of Caylus (~1182-1250)								
	Lords of Malemort and Donzenac			Géraud de Malemort (d. 1231)	Geraud II of Malemort	Géraud III de Malemort (~1275)						
	Lords of Amboise			Hugues d'Amboise IV (1190–1218)	Jean d'Amboise (1218–1274)	Jean d'Amboise II (1274–1303)						
	Lords of Brie-Comte-Robert			Robert II, Count of Dreux (1188–1218)	Robert III, Count of Dreux (1218–1233)	Peter I, Duke of Brittany (1233–1250)	John I, Duke of Brittany (1250–1286)	Alix of Brittany, Dame de Pontarcy (1286–1288)	Blanche of Brittany (1288–1326)			
	Barons of Cande			Coots of Chemillé (1125–1203)	Geoffroy de Chemillé (1203–1207)	Guillaume de Thouars (1207–1243)	Geoffrey IV of Chateaubriant (1244–1263)	Geoffrey V of Chateaubriant(1263–1284)	Geoffrey VI of Chateaubriant(1284–1301)			
	Barons of Ham			Wautier of Ham (~1200)	Odo IV of Ham (1216–1234)	Odo V of Ham (1234–1260)	John I of Ham	John II of Ham (1244–1269)	John III of Ham (1275–1283)	Odo VI of Ham (1287–1307)		
	Barons of Crequy			Henri de Créquy (d. 1240)								
	Lords of Acquigny			Roger IV of Tosny (1162–1204)	Philip II of France (1204–1206)	Barthélemy of Roye (1206–1222)	Matthew II of Montmorency (1222–1230)	Guy VII de Laval (1230–1267)	Guy VIII de Laval (1267–1295)	Guy IX de Laval (1295–1323)		
	Lords of Montmirail			Jean de Montmirail (d. 1217)								

== Lords ==
In the Ille de France
#	Title	Liege-Lord & Region	Coat of arms	1st	2nd	3rd	4th	5th	6th
	Lords of Apcher	Bishop of Mende?							
	Lords d'Assérac	Barons of La Roche-Bernard?							
	Lords d'Auzon	Kings of France?							
	Lords of Biron	Counts of Périgord							
	Lords of Bony	French Royal Domain?							
	Lords of Canet	Kings of France?							
	Lords of Chantilly	Kings of France							
	Lords of Courcy in Calvados	Kings of France							
	Barons of Château-Raoul	Kings of France							
	Lords of Châteauneuf-en-Thymerais	Kings of France							
	Lords of Combourg	Bishops of Dol?							
	Lords of Deuilly	Kings of France?							
	Lords of Drincham	Kings of France/Cte. of Flanders							
	Lords of Estouteville-Écalles	Kings of France							
	Lords of Gontaut	Counts of Périgord?							
	Lords of Heilly	Counts of Vermandois?							
	Lords of Juigné	Counts of Anjou?							
	Lords of La Motte-Sonzay	Kings of France							
	Barons of La Roche-Bernard	Kings of Fr later Dk.of Brittany							
	Lords of La Ferté-Bernard	Kings of France							
	Lords of L'Isle-Adam	Kings of France							
	Lords of Madaillan	Counts of Perigord?							
	Barons of Maillé	Kings of France							
	Lords of Marly	Kings of France?							
	Barons of Mathefelon	Kings of France?							
	Lords of Montboissier	Count of Auvergne?							
	Barons of Montmirail, Lords of Oisy	Kings of France?							
	Lords of Montsoreau	Counts of Anjou?							
	Lords of Parthenay	Counts of Poitou?							
	Lords of Pesselières	Counts of Sancerre							
	Lords of Pirou	Kings of France?							
	Lords of Pisany	Kings of France?							
	Barons of Preuilly	Kings of France							
	Lords of Ravensberg	Kings of France?							
	Lords of Ronquerolles	Kings of France?							
	Barons of Roye	King of France as Duke of Normandy			Alix de Roye d. 1203	Barthélemy of Roye 1203–1237			
	Lords of Sainte-Suzanne	Counts of Maine?							
	Lords of Saint-Mauris	Kings of France?							
	Lords of Semilly	Kings of France							
	Baron de Sillé	Viscount of Beaumont-sur-Sarthe							
	Lords of Sully	Kings of France							
	Barons de Tancarville	Kings of France							
	Lords of Thoury	Bishop of Orleans?							
	Lords of Thoury-sur-Besbre	Kings of France?							
	Barons of Tille	King of France							
	Lords of Trie	Kings of France?		Enguerrand Aiguillon (d. ~1206)	Jean of Trie (d. 1236)	Mathieu of Trie I (d.1272)	John I, Count of Dammartin (d. 1304)		
	Lords of Varennes	Kings of France?							
	Lords of Vaumarcus	Lords of Oron?							
	Lords of Vergongheon	Bishops of Clermont							
	Lords of Vierzon	Counts of Blois							
	Lords of Villepreux			William of La Ferte-Arnaud (d. 1226)					

In Nouvelle-Aquitaine
Number	Title	Coat of Arms	1st	2nd	3rd	4th	5th	6th	7th	8th
	Barons of Albret									
	Lords of Anglade		Guillaume d'Anglade (~1270)							
	Barons of Arjuzanx/Bressenx									
	Lords of Barbezieux									
	Barons de Bazas									
	Lords of Beynac-et-Cazenac									
	Princes/Lords of Bidache/Gramont									
	Lords of Blanquefort									
	Princes/Lords of Blaye									
	Lords of Bressuire									
	Lords of Caumont-Sur-Garonne									
	Lords of Chabanais		Hugh de Chabanais (~1248)							
	Prince/Lord of Chalais									
	Lords of Chateau Biron		Henri I de Gontaut (1154–1236)	Gaston II de Gontaut (1236–1251)	Gaston III de Gontaut (1251–1297)	Pierre I of Gontaut (1297–1344)				
	Lords of Château de Montignac									
	Lords of Château de Pineuilh									
	Lords of Cholet									
	Barons of Cognac									
	Lords of Cosnac		Guillaume de Cosnac (~1223)							
	Lords of Duras		Viscounts of Bezaume							
	Lords of Espelette									
	Lords of Exoudun									
	Abbots of Fontevraud									
	Lords Hautefort & Born									
	Lords of Le Goalard									
	Captal of La Teste-de-Buch									
	Lords of Jayac		Viscounts of Turenne until 1251	Rudel Hélie d'Aillac	Bernard Albouin (1282)	Pierre du Val (1299)				
	Baron de Navailles									
	Lords of Noailles									
	Lords of Matha									
	Lords of Merles/Pestes		Guy I of Pestels (end of the 13th c.)							
	Lords of Mervent & Vouvant									
	Lords of Montmorillon									
	Lords of Montignac									
	Lords of Mortagne-sur-Gironde									
	Lords of Oléron									
	Lords of Ornon									
	Barons of Parthenay									
	Lord of Pons									
	Lords of Rochefort									
	Lords of Royan									
	Lords of Saint-Germain-de-Confolens									
	Abbots of Saint-Jean-d'Angély									
	Lords of Saint-Louis-de-Montferrand									
	Abbots of Saint-Sever									
	Lords of Surgères									
	Lords of Tonnay-Charente									

In Brittany
Number	Title	Coat of arms	1st	2nd	3rd	4th	5th	6th	7th	8th
	Lords of Acigne		Geoffrey I of Acigné (d.1207)	Péan d'Acigné						
	Lords of Attichy									
	Lords of Beaumanoir									
	Lords of Blain (de jure)									
	Lords of Châteaugiron									
	Lords of Clisson									
	Lords of Derval									
	Lords of Gouyon		Etienne of Gouyon (~1220)	Raoul of Gouyon	Alain of Gouyon	Alain II of Gouyon	Bertrand I of Gouyon			
	Lords of La Haye de Lavau									
	Lords of Machecoul									
	Lords of Montfort-sur-Meu									
	Lords of Pont-l'Abbé									
	Lords of Quinton									
	Lords of Rieux									
	Lords of Tinténiac									

In the Grand Est
Number	Title	Leigelord	Coat of Arms	1st	2nd	3rd	4th	5th	6th	7th	8th
	Lords of Cicon	Duke of Burgundy									
	Lords of Cuiseaux	Duke of Burgundy									
	Lords of Briey	Count of Bar/Duke of Lorraine									
	Lords of Montfaucon	Duke of Burgundy									
	Lords of Montluel	Duke of Burgundy									
	Lords of Sennecey	Duke of Burgundy									

In the Hauts-de-France
Number	Title	Leigelord	Coat of arms	1st	2nd	3rd	4th	5th	6th	7th	8th
	Lords of Alembon	Count of Guines									
	Lords of Ardres	Counts of Guines & Count of Artois									
	Lords of Avesnes & Guise										
	Lords of Bailleul										
	Lords of Beauffort	Count of Artois		Baudouin of Beauffort (1172–1208)	Aleaume of Beauffort (1208–1219)	Wautier of Beauffort (1219-12??)	Baudouin II of Beauffort (12??-1250)	Geoffroy of Beauffort (1250–1301)			
	Lords of Fauquembergue										
	Lords of Gavre										
	Lords of Grâce-Berleur										
	Lords of Humières	Count of Artois									
	Lords of Roubaix										
	Lords of Zinneghem										

Occitania
Number	Title	Leigelord	Coat of Arms	1st	2nd	3rd	4th	5th	6th	7th	8th
	Lords of Apchier	Count of Gevaudan		Guérin de Châteauneuf (~1180)							
	Lords of Arpajon	Count of Rodez		Bernard I Calmont-Plancatge (~1200-1230)	Bernard II d'Arpajon (~1265)	Hugh d'Arpajon (~1298)	Berangar I d'Arpajon (~1345)				
	Lords of Calmont d'Olt			Bégon III de Calmont d'Olt (~1214)	Guillaume de Calmont (~1225)	Raimond de Calmont d'Olt (~1297)					
	Lords of Canilhac										
	Lords of Caraman										
	Lords of Castres	Viscount of Albi									
	Lords of Cenaret	Count of Gevaudan									
	Lords of Florac	Count of Gevaudan									
	Lords of Châteauneuf-de-Randon										
	Lords of Entraygues	Viscount of Carlat		Viscounts of Carlat							
	Lords of Estaing	Count of Toulouse		Dieudonné d'Estaing (~1214)							
	Lords of Montbrun			Alleman du Puy (~1267)							
	Lords of Pomayrols			Pons de Cayrodes (~1261)							
	Lords Porcellets										
	Lords of Peyre	Count of Gevaudan									
	Lords of Randon	Count of Gevaudan									
	Lords of Sainte-Eulalie-d'Olt	Count of Toulouse		Giraud de Curières (d. after 1264)							
	Lords of Salmiech										
	Lords of Tournel	Count of Gevaudan									
	Lords of Uzès										
	Lords of Venzac	Count of Rodez?		Possibly Bernart de Venzac (~1200-1210)							

Pays de la Loire

Number	Title	Leigelord	Coat of arms	1st	2nd	3rd	4th
	Lords of Beauvau (Maine et Loire)	Count of Anjou		Robert de Beauvau (1187–1227)	Baudouin de Beauvau (1227-12??)	René de Beauvau (12??-1266)	Mathieu de Beauvau (1266–1328)
	Lords of Breze	Count of Anjou		Geoffroy II of Breze (~1249)	Jean I of Breze (~1268)		

Centre Val de Loire

Number	Title	Leigelord	1st

Bourgogne Franche-Comte

Number	Title	Leigelord	Coat of Arms	1st	2nd	3rd	4th	5th
	Lords of Joux	Count of Champagne		Amaury III de Joux (~1200)	Henri I of Joux (~1200-1243)	Amaury IV de Joux (1243–1292)	Henri II de Joux (1292–1294)	Jean de Joux (1294–1304)
	Lords of Traves	Count of Champagne, Duke of Lorraine after 1275		Alix of Dreux (1200–1258)	Robert of Choiseul (1258–1300)			

Normandy

Number	Title	Leigelord	Coat of Arms	1st	2nd	3rd	4th	5th	6th
	Lords of Beaumont-le-Roger	Dukes of Normandy/Kings of France		Royal Domain of the King of France					
	Lords of Beuzeval	Dukes of Normandy/Kings of France							
	Lords of Valmont	Dukes of Normandy/Kings of France		Henri of Estouteville (1186–1232)	Jean of Estouteville (1232–1258)	Robert IV of Estouteville (1258–1310)			
	Lords of Gratot	Dukes of Normandy/Kings of France		Richard de Creully (~1204)	Jeanne de Gratot	Guillaume d'Argouges (after 1255)			
	Lords of Molay			Guillaume IV de Molay (d. ~1212)	Guillaume V de Molay (~1224~1271)	Roger IV de Molay (d. ~1300)			
	Lords of Tilly	Dukes of Normandy/Kings of France		Henry of Tilly (d. 1205)	Guillaume de Tilly	Jean de Tilly (~1264)			

Provence Alpes-Cote d'Azur

Number	Title	Leigelord	1st

Auvergne-Rhone-Alps

Number	Title	Leigelord	Coat of arms	1st	2nd	3rd	4th	5th	6th
	Lords of Aix-la-Fayette			Pons Motier (Beginning of 13th century)					
	Lords of Anterroches								
	Lords of Boisset	Viscount of Carlat		Bernard de Boisset (d. 1268)	Astorg de Boisset (~1284)				
	Lords of Chalus			Robert of Chalus (~1220)	Hugues de Chalus (~1230)	Géraud de Chalus (~1241)			
	Lords of Chapteuil (Saint-Julien-Chapteuil)			possibly Pons de Capduelh (~1190-1210)					
	Lords of Chateau de la Rochelambert								
	Lords of Comblat	Viscount of Carlat		G. Gausselmi (1266)	Guirbert de La Garde (~1291)				
	Lords of Conros	Viscount of Carlat							
	Lords of Clermont (Isere)	Dauphin of Vienne		Guillaume de Clermont (~1203)					
	Lords of Durat	Owner of Royal lands of Auvergne		Franconnet de Durat (~1248)	Guillaume de Durat (~1250-1302)				
	Lords of Fontanges	Viscount of Turenne?		Maurin de Fontanges (~1244)					
	Lords of Glaine-Montaigut and Montgilbert	Count of Auvergne		Pierre I Aycelin (~1207)	Peter II Aycelin (~1280)	Guillaume I Aycelin (~1290)			
	Lords of Lastic			Hugues de Lastic (~1211~1225)	Bompar of Lastic (1225–1256)	Bertrand Bompar II (1256–1270)	Pierre Bompar (1270–1299)		
	Lords of La Tour d'Auvergne	Count of Toulouse		Bertrand I de La Tour (~1208)	Bertrand II de La Tour (d. 1253)	Bertrand III de la Tour (1270)	Bertrand IV de La Tour (~1295)		
	Lords of Messac			Astorg de Messac (~1258~1290)	Guy de Messac				
	Lords of Montal-lez-Arpajon								
	Lords of Montrognon	Dauphin of Auvergne		Guillaume de Montrognon (~1234)					
	Lords of Montpensier								
	Lords of Roche-d'Agoux			Guillaume de la Roche d'Agoux (~1258)					
	Lords of Rochefort d'Ally			Guillaume de Rochefort (~1200)	Guillaume II de Rochefort (~1269)	Odilon de Rochefort (~1283)			
	Lords of Saint-Vidal			Guigon de Goudet (~1300)					
	Lords of Sedaiges								
	Lords of Severac	Count of Toulouse		Gui IV de Séverac (1189–1209)	Déodat of Caylus	Gui V of Severac (1250–1273)			
	Lords of Solignac-sur-Loire			Beraud II of Solignac (~1195)	Beraud III de Solignac (~1234)	Beraud IV de Solignac (~1261)	Gilbert de Solignac (~1294)		
	Lords of Tournemire			Rigaud de Tournemire (~1259)					

== Knights of France ==
- Geoffrey of Villehardouin
- Guérin, Hospitallier Knight, Bishop, Chancellor of France
- Stephen Longchamp

== See also ==
- List of nobles and magnates of England in the 13th century
- List of nobles and magnates within the Holy Roman Empire in the 13th century
- List of nobles and magnates within Scandinavia in the 13th century
