= Hugh V of Saint-Pol =

Hugh I
- jure uxoris Count of Blois
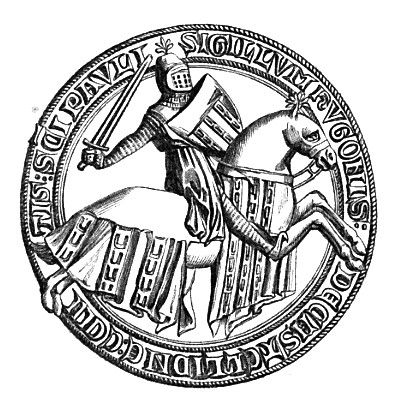
- Born: after 1197
- Died: 9 April 1248
- Noble family: Châtillon
- Spouses: Agnes of Bar-le-Duc (m. 1216; died c. 1225) Mary, Countess of Blois (m. 1226; died 1241) Mahaut of Guînes
- Issue: John I, Count of Blois; Guy II of Châtillon; Gaucher IV de Châtillon; Hugh; Basile
- Father: Gaucher III of Châtillon
- Mother: Elisabeth of Saint-Pol

Hugh (c. 1198 – 9 April 1248) was jure uxoris count of Blois from 1230 to 1241 and count of Saint Pol (as Hugh V) from 1226 to 1248.

Hugh was the son of Walter III of Châtillon and Elisabeth, daughter of Count Hugo IV of Saint-Pol. He married Agnes of Bar-le-Duc, daughter of Thibaut I of Bar-le-Duc and Hermesend of Bar-sur-Seine, in 1216. By 1225, Agnes had died and Hugh married Marie.

In 1226, Hugh married Marie of Avesnes, daughter of Walter II of Avesnes and Margaret of Blois. They had 5 children:

1. John I (d. 1280), Count of Blois
2. Guy III (d. 1289), Count of Saint Pol
3. Gaucher IV (d. 1261), lord of Chatillon, Crécy and Crèvecœur. His son was: Gaucher V de Châtillon.
4. Hugh (d. 1255)
5. Basile (d. 1280), became Abbess of Notre Dame du Val in 1248

Through his marriage Hugh became the first Count of Blois from the House of Châtillon. It marked the end of the first dynasty of Blois that lasted over 400 years. After the death of Marie, Hugh married Mahaut, sister of Baldwin III, Count of Guînes.

In 1226 the Cistercian nunnery Pont-aux-Dames in Couilly was founded by Hugh. Later Hugh, with the assistance of Philip Mécringes, founded a Cistercian nunnery at Troissy called L'Amour-Dieu in 1232.

Hugh intended to follow the pious king Louis IX when he started on the Seventh Crusade, but he died in 1248.

Hugh V of Saint-Pol House of Châtillon Born: after 1197 Died: 9 April 1248
Preceded by Guy II	Count of Saint Pol; 1226–1248	Succeeded by Guy III
Preceded by Marie	Count of Blois with Marie; 1230–1241	Succeeded by John I
