= Gaucher IV de Châtillon =

Gaucher IV
- lord of Chatillon
- Died: c. 1263
- Noble family: Châtillon
- Spouse: Isabelle von Lezinnes
- Issue: Gaucher V of Châtillon; Guido; Mary
- Father: Hugh I of Châtillon
- Mother: Mary, Countess of Blois

Gaucher IV de Châtillon, in German Walter IV, (died c. 1261/65) was Lord of Châtillon, Crécy, Crèvecœur and Troissy from the House of Châtillon.

== Biography ==
He was the third-born son of Hugh I of Châtillon (d. 1248), Count of Saint-Pol and Lord of Châtillon, and Mary, Countess of Blois. His older brothers were Count John I of Blois (d. 1279) and Count Guy III, Count of Saint-Pol (d. 1289). As a later-born son, he received some subordinate castle and manorial dominions in the inheritance decreed by his father in 1246, including the family seat in Châtillon-sur-Marne. He is last documented in December 1260, when he and his wife made a donation to the nuns of Notre-Dame du Pont. His wife confirmed a donation made by him (Gavchier de Chastillon Sires de Crecy) to the same religious institution in February 1265. Apparently, Gaucher IV had already died by this time.

== Family ==
Gaucher IV was married by 1258 at the latest to Isabelle von Lezinnes (d. after 1265) from the Villehardouin family, a great-granddaughter of the chronicler Geoffrey of Villehardouin. Their children were:

- Gaucher V of Châtillon (d. 1329), Lord of Châtillon etc., from 1303 Count of Porcéan, Constable of France.
- Guido of Châtillon (d. c. 1281/86).
- Mary of Châtillon (d. after 1296); married to Milon IX de Noyers (d. 1291), Lord of Noyers.

== Sources ==
- André Duchesne, Histoire genealogique de la maison de Chastillon sur Marne. Paris 1621, Preuves p. 191 f.
