= Gilles Aycelin de Montaigu (disambiguation) =

Gilles Aycelin de Montaigu may refer to

- Gilles I Aycelin de Montaigu (died 1318 or 1319), bishop of Rouen, see Roman Catholic Archdiocese of Rouen
- Gilles II Aycelin de Montaigu (or Montaigut, Montagu), French bishop and diplomat, died 5 December 1378
