= Hugh VIII =

Hugh VIII may refer to:

- Hugh VIII of Lusignan (died 1165 or 1171)
- Hugh VIII of La Marche (1259–1303)
