= Gaucher V de Châtillon =

- Blazon of Gaucher V de Châtillon; Gules three pales vair a chief or.
- Born: c. 1249; Châtillon-sur-Marne
- Died: 1329
- Noble family: House of Châtillon
- Spouses: Isabelle of Dreux; Hélisende Vergy; Isabelle of Rumigny
- Issue: Gaucher VI de Chatillon (1281–1325); Jean II de Chatillon (1283–1363); Joanna of Châtillon (c. 1285–1354); Hugues de Chatillon (1287–1336); Marie de Châtillon; Isabelle de Châtillon
- Father: Gaucher IV de Châtillon (d. 1261), Lord of Chatillon
- Mother: Isabelle of Villehardouin (d. 1329)

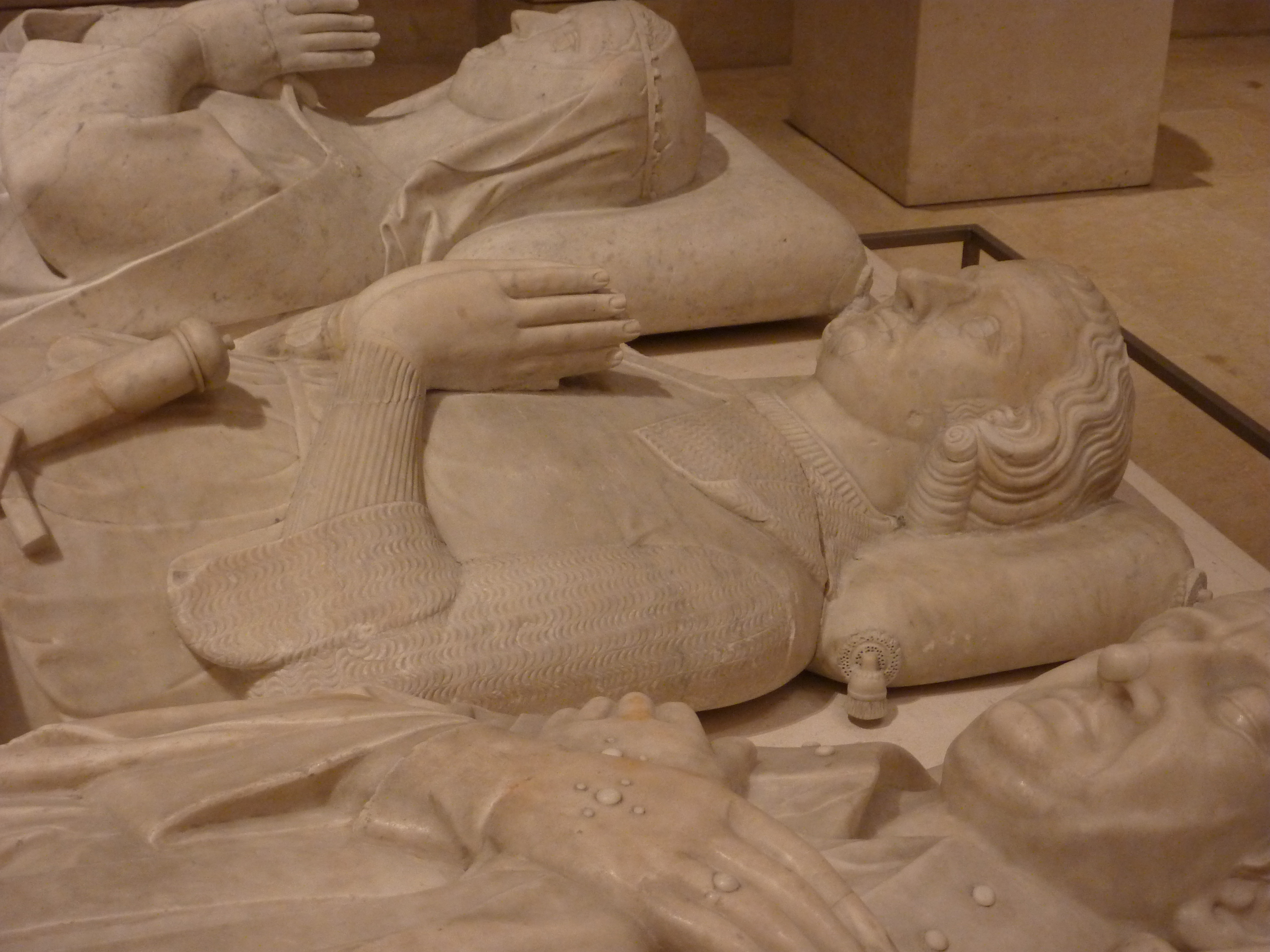
Gaucher de Châtillon tomb at the Louvre

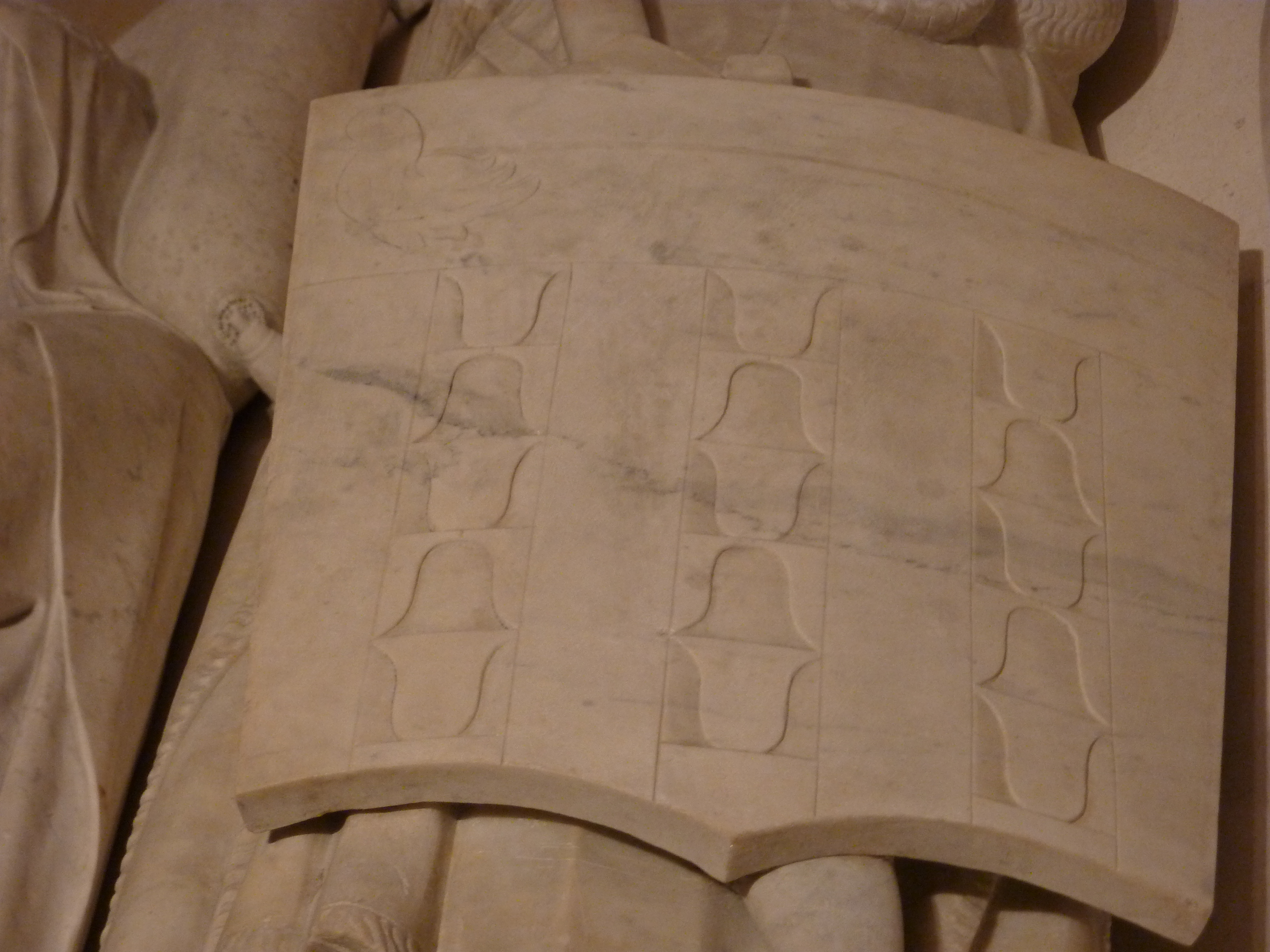
Coat of arms from Châtillon's tomb

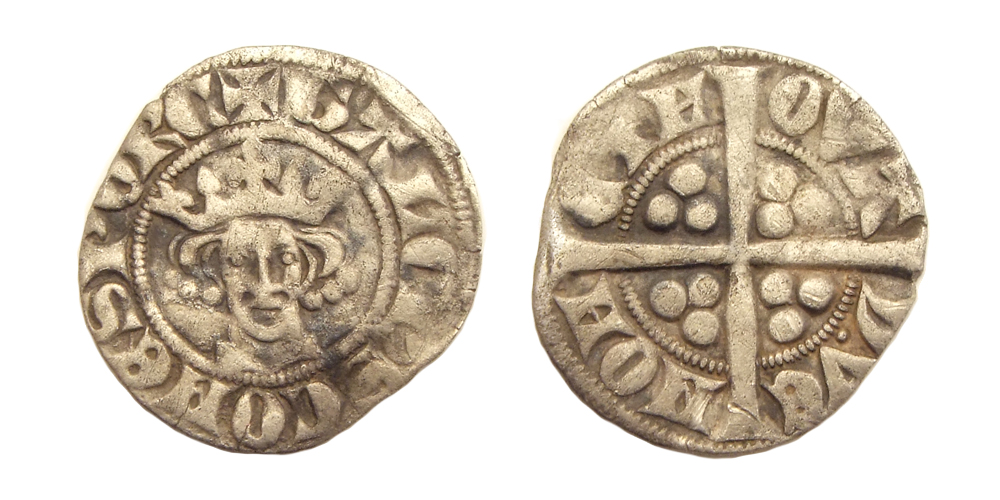
Esterlin, Gaucher de Chatillon, 1312–1322

Gaucher V de Châtillon (c. 1249 in Châtillon-sur-Marne – 1329), Lord of Châtillon, Count of Porcien, was constable of Champagne in 1284 and then Constable of France (1302–1329) during the reigns of five different kings. He was also tutor to the future Louis X of France and his primary minister.

== Biography ==
Gaucher was the son of Gaucher IV de Châtillon and Isabelle de Villehardouin, and was the grandson of Hugues de Châtillon, Count of Blois and Saint-Pol.

In 1284, King Philip III of France named Gaucher, Constable of Champagne. He traded Philip IV for the county of Chatillon in return for Crecy in 1290, however in 1303 Philip forced the return of the county in exchange for Château-Porcien. Gaucher kept the castle of Châtillon, which was reserved for him and his descendants.

In 1291, Gaucher repelled the army of Count Henry III of Bar, son-in-law of King Edward I of England. He fought the English in Guyenne in 1296. In 1302, during the conflict between Pope Boniface VIII and Philip IV, Gaucher tried to convince the nobility that the King of France was only accountable to God.

=== The Flanders Revolt ===
In Flanders in 1302, Gaucher quashed the revolt in Bruges and built in that city a citadel at the expense of the inhabitants. He built two others in Lille and Courtray and fortified several other castles that had been demolished.

== In fiction ==
Châtillon is a character in Les Rois maudits (The Accursed Kings), a series of French historical novels by Maurice Druon. He was played by Jean Chevrier in the 1972 French miniseries adaptation of the series, and by Wadeck Stanczak in the 2005 adaptation.

== Sources ==
- Evergates, Theodore (2007). The Aristocracy in the County of Champagne, 1100-1300. University of Pennsylvania Press.
- Stones, Alison (2014). "Manuscripts Illuminated in France 1260-1320 and their Patrons". In Beier, Christine; Kubina, Evelyn Theresia (eds.). Wege zum Illuminierten Buch: Herstellungsbedingungen fur Buchmalerei in Mittelalter und Fruher Neuzeit. Bohlau Verlag Gmbh & Cie. pp. 26–44.

Gaucher V de Châtillon House of Châtillon Born: c.1249 Died: 1329
Political offices
Preceded by Raoul of Clermont	Constable of France; 1307–1329	Succeeded by Raoul I of Brienne
