= Guy III of Saint-Pol =

Guy III
- Count of Saint-Pol
- Coat of arms of the Counts of Blois-Châtillon
- Died: 1289
- Noble family: Châtillon
- Spouse: Matilda of Brabant, Countess of Artois (m. 1255; died 1288)
- Issue: Guy IV; Hugh II; Jacques; Beatrix; Jeanne; Gertrude
- Father: Hugh I, Count of Blois
- Mother: Mary, Countess of Blois

Guy III of Châtillon, Count of Saint-Pol (died 1289) was a French nobleman, and a younger son of Hugh I, Count of Blois, and Mary, Countess of Blois.

While his elder brother John I of Châtillon succeeded to their mother's County of Blois, Guy was given their father's county of Saint-Pol-sur-Ternoise at his death in 1248.

== Marriage and issue ==
On January 16, 1255, Guy married Matilda of Brabant, Countess of Artois, daughter of Henry II, Duke of Brabant and Marie of Swabia, and thereafter was a supporter of his brother-in-law Henry III against Guelders. They had six children:

- Guy IV, Count of Saint-Pol
- Hugh II, Count of Blois.
- Jacques, lord of Leuze-Châtillon.
- Beatrix (d. 1304), married John I of Brienne, Count of Eu
- Jeanne, married Guillaume III de Chauvigny, Lord of Châteauroux
- Gertrude, married Florent, Lord of Mechelen

Guy joined the Eighth Crusade (1270) and the ill-fated Crusade of Aragón of Philip III of France.

== Sources ==
- Armstrong, Abigail S. (2021). "English Royal Family Ties: Edward I and his Breton Nieces". In Bérat, Emma O.; Dumitrescu, Irina; Hardie, Rebecca (eds.). Relations of Power: Women's Networks in the Middle Ages. Bonn University Press. pp. 85–104. ISBN 9783847012429.
- Evergates, Theodore (2007). The Aristocracy in the County of Champagne, 1100-1300. University of Pennsylvania Press. ISBN 978-0812240191.
- Pollock, M. A. (2015). Scotland, England and France After the Loss of Normandy, 1204-1296. The Boydell Press. ISBN 978-1843839927.
- Commire, Anne; Klezmer, Deborah, eds. (2001). "Maude of Brabant (1224-1288)". Women in World History: A Biographical Encyclopedia. Vol. 10: Maa-Mei. Yorkin Publications. pp. 637–638. ISBN 0-7876-4069-7.

Guy III of Saint-Pol House of Châtillon Died: 1289
Preceded by Hugh V	Count of Saint Pol; 1248–1289	Succeeded by Hugh VI
