= Guy IX de Laval =

Guy IX de Laval (c. 1270 – 22 January 1333) was a member of the House of Laval. He was Seigneur de Laval and d'Acquigny, of Beaumont-du-Gâtinais, Viscomte de Rennes, Comte de Caserte in Campania and Baron de Vitré.

== Family ==
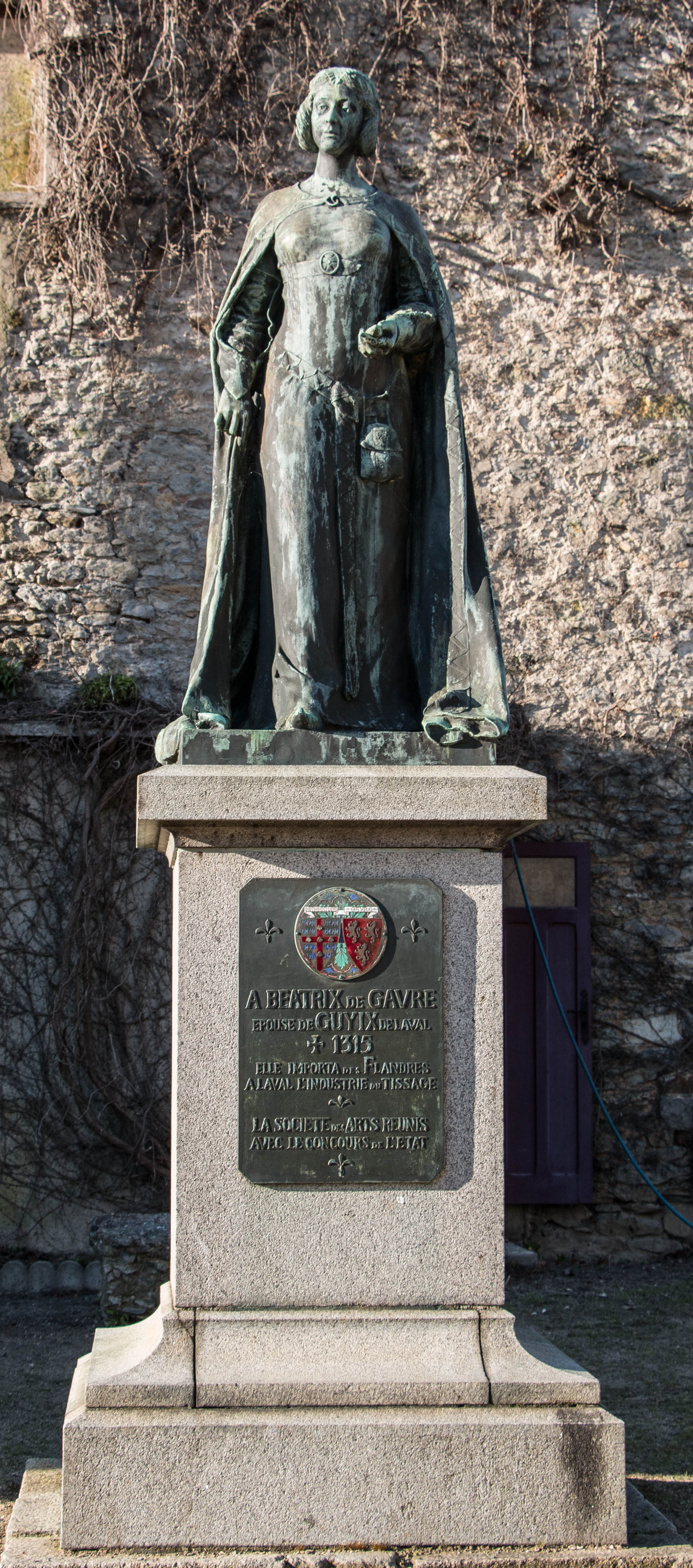
Statue of Béatrix de Gâvre in the courtyard of the old castle de Laval

Guy IX was the son of Guy VIII de Laval and Isabelle de Beaumont-Gâtinais

In 1297 he married Béatrix de Gavre, countess of Falkemberg, only daughter of Rasès de Gavre.

Children:

- Guy X de Laval, who married Béatrix de Bretagne, daughter of Arthur II, Duke of Brittany, on 2 March 1315
- Rasès de Laval, lord of Morhem in Flanders, died after 1348, without known offspring
- Foulques de Laval, progenitor of the lords of Challouyau in Burgundy and Retz
- Pierre de Laval, bishop of Rennes, died 1357
- Jean de Laval, knight, lord of Passy-sur-Marne, who married Jeanne de Chemillé (died childless), and Aliénor Le Bigot de la Bérardière
- Isabeau (died 1322), who married Péan de La Roche-Bernard (died 18 June 1347 - Battle of La Roche-Derrien), Lord of Lohéac
- Catherine de Laval, wife of Gérard IV de Retz
- Jeanne de Laval, nun at Saint-Georges de Rennes.

== Sources ==
- Walsby, Malcolm (2007). The Counts of Laval. Aldershot: Ashgate Publishing Company. ISBN 9780754658115.
