= Olivier I de Clisson =

Breton nobleman and knight

Olivier de Clisson, Olivier I de Clisson,
- Breton Lord and Knight
- Coat of Arms Clisson Family
- Born: 1205; Château de Clisson, Brittany
- Died: 1262 (aged 56–57)
- Noble family: de Clisson
- Spouse: Plaisou de La Roche-Derrien
- Issue: Olivier II de Clisson (Breton Lord); Guillaume de Clisson
- Father: Guillaume de Clisson
- Mother: Constance du Pontchateau

Olivier I de Clisson was a Breton frontier lord. He is mainly remembered for his conflict with his half-brothers and the Duke of Brittany.

== The family conflict ==
Known as Olivier the Elder. He was the son of Guillaume de Clisson and Constance de Pontchâteau (born around 1190 and died in 1244). Constance, was widowed after Guilaume apparently did not return from crusade. Constance remarried Herve de Blain in 1225 who acted as her proxy in her lands of Pontchateau. With Herve she had two further sons, Eudes and Guillaume. Herve also managed the Clisson lands as Olivier 1 was still in his minority, but by 1236, Constance reappears in records as Herve has also died. Olivier I married Plaisou de La Roche-Derrien, daughter of Conan I of Penthièvre (1160-1202).

== Additional pressure ==
Initially the de Clissons appear to be respectful vassals of the Duke of Brittany (House of Dreux), however the duke’s wife Alix from the House of Thouars, started to acquire estates in Southern Brittany and influenced local politics in Poitou south of the border in France.

These estates would later pass to her second son, Olivier de Braine, known as de Machecoul. This Olivier de Machecoul became, with the support of his half-brother, the new Duke, John I of Brittany, the most powerful lord of the Poitou marches and Retz, even acquiring by marriage, a castle at La Benaste, which had previously belonged to the de Clissons. Despite these pressures, the de Clissons remained loyal to the Duke. In 1214, they fulfilled their vassal duties by joining the Breton levy to support the war effort of the French against the English.

== The Inheritance of the half-brothers ==
When Constance de Pontchateau died around 1251, a serious quarrel between the three sons of Constance ensued as to their inheritance, requiring the interference of the Duke. A record from October 14, 1251, kept at the Departmental Archives of Loire-Atlantique, states that Olivier 1’s half-brothers, Eudes de Pont and Guillaume de Fresnay, both knights, entered into an agreement of mutual assistance with the Duke John 1, to secure the lands of Pontchâteau for themselves which Olivier 1 inherited as Constance’ eldest son. In case of capture of their lands by Olivier, Eudes and Guillaume would receive land of equal value from the duke in the area of Blain or Guerande.

== Appeal to the King of France ==
To defend himself against theses encroachments of the ducal authority, Olivier de Clisson appealed to the king of France for justice. He found an ally in Alain d'Avaugour, lord of Mayenne and Dinan, heir to the counts of Rennes and rival of the Dukes of Brittany. Alain was called to testify for Olivier I before the Parliament of Paris. In the years 1260-1262, the Parliament had ruled on several matters between the Duke and his vassals in the south of the Duchy such as: the de Leon matter, the de Retz-Machecoul matter, and of course the de Clisson matter.

The Parliament sought to establish compromises and calm animosities. The ruling ordered the return of the fiefs seized by the Duke to their former holders balanced against paying retributory fines. Herve de Leon had to pay 10,000 livres while Olivier I had to pay 4,000 livres to regain his castle. Negotiations did not include Olivier I, but his eldest son, Olivier II, called the Younger, cited as a squire in records. Furthermore, Olivier I the Elder had to show submission to the Duke, promise to cease hostilities and any further court actions. Olivier I could not demand compensation from the Duke for his destroyed castle, he did recover Maison de la Verrerie. Eudes du Pont and Guillaume de Fresnay retained their properties. In 1294, the son of Eudes de Pont, Eudes II was no longer deemed a vassal of the lord of Clisson but now a vassal of the Duke as lord of Pontchateaux.
