= Olivier II de Clisson =

Breton nobleman and knight

Olivier de Clisson, Olivier II de Clisson,
- Breton Lord and Knight
- Coat of Arms Clisson Family
- Born: 1236; Château de Clisson, Brittany
- Died: 1307 (aged 70–71)
- Noble family: de Clisson
- Spouse: Alienor des Roches
- Issue: Olivier III de Clisson; Guillaume de Clisson
- Father: Olivier I de Clisson the elder (Breton Lord)
- Mother: Plaisou de La Roche-Derrien

Olivier II de Clisson, the Younger, was a Breton frontier lord and son of Olivier I, the Elder of Clisson.

== Conflict with the Breton Duke ==
The Breton Duke John 1, had forced Olivier II’s father to capitulate on previous conflict, and only addressed Olivier II thereafter. The duke also obliged the de Clissons to pay a penalty of 4 000 livres, but refused to repair a damaged de Clisson castle, generally presumed to refer to the castle at Blain. The castle of Blain had not been destroyed in its entirety so Olivier II undertook work in order to restore it. Olivier II had the tower of the drawbridge rebuilt, the prison towers and its two curtain walls, the belfry, and the buildings of the Petit Château rebuilt.

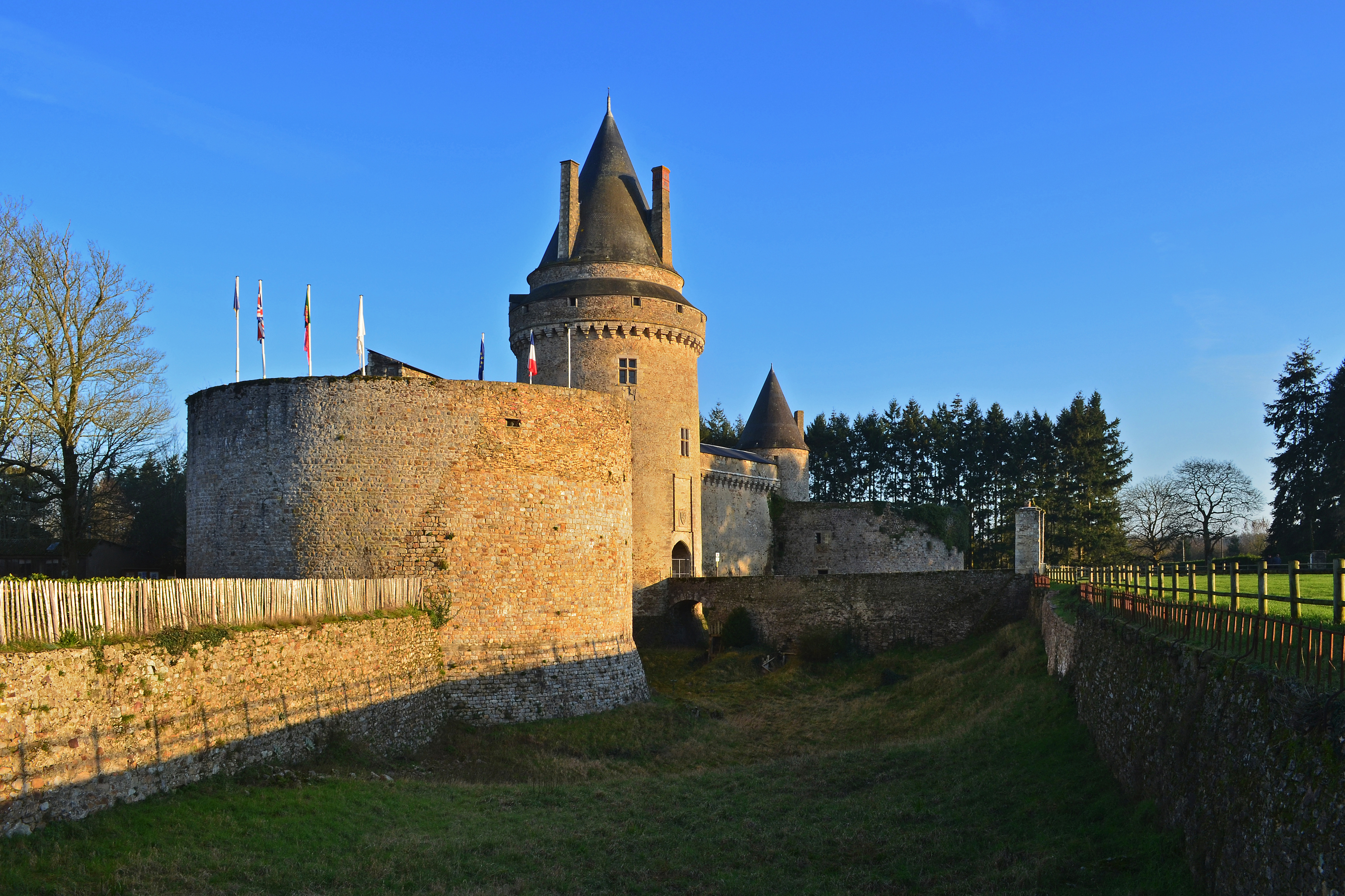
Blain - Chateau

After the events of the early 1260s, the relations of Olivier II with the Duke, and his neighbors and relatives, entered a phase of normalization. He concluded an agreement in Nantes in 1265 with his uncle Eudes du Pont, on rights to the forest of Pont.

In 1275, Olivier II adhered to a decision with Duke John I to exchange the right of lease for the right of redemption. Likewise in 1293, the lord of Clisson declared to the duke loyalty by rents which he gathered from the military districts around his castles.

== Acquiring lands in France ==
Like other great Breton lords, the Lords of Clisson began pursuing a policy of acquiring fiefs outside Brittany in the kingdom of France, which would ease the absolute grip of the Dukes of Brittany had on them. From these French lands, Olivier II therefore also had vassalic duties with another duke, the Duke of Angevin in the districts of Montfaucon-et-Moine.
