= Robert of Châtillon =

Bishop of Langres

Robert of Châtillon (died 1215), was bishop of Langres from 1210 until his death. He came from a noble background. Robert was a cousin of Bernard of Clairvaux.
