= Walter II of Avesnes =

12th c French noble, Count of Blois & Chartres (jure uxoris)

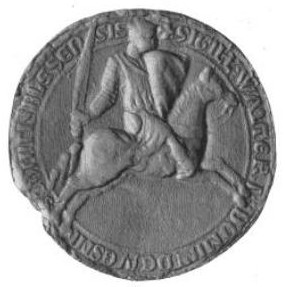

Walter II of Avesnes (b. 1170 – d. 1244) was lord of Avesnes, Leuze, of Condé and Guise, and through his marriage to Margaret of Blois, he became count of Blois and Chartres. He was the son of James of Avesnes, and Adèle, lady of Guise.

Walter fought alongside Count Ferdinand of Flanders at the Battle of Bouvines in 1214, then left to fight in the Holy Land. Taken prisoner, he was ransomed by the Knights Templar and helped construct the Pilgrim Castle, in 1218, donating 1,000 Saracen bezants towards its construction.

With the income from Guise lands, he began work on modernizing his castles. He also built a castle Englancourt to control the road through the county of Hainaut.

== Family ==
Walter married Margaret, Countess of Blois and Chartres, daughter of Theobald V, Count of Blois, count of Blois and Chartres, and Alix of France. Their children:

- Theobald, died young
- Mary, Countess of Blois (1241 †), married Hugh I, Count of Blois
- Isabelle, married John, lord of Oisy and Montreuil

== Sources ==
- Folda, Jaroslav (2005). Crusader Art in the Holy Land, From the Third Crusade to the Fall of Acre. Cambridge University Press. ISBN 9780521835831.
- Kennedy, Hugh (2001). Crusader Castles. Cambridge University Press. ISBN 9780521799133.
- Platelle, Henri (2004). Présence de l'au-delà: une vision médiévale du monde (in French). Presses Universitaires du Septentrion. ISBN 9782859398521.
- Raymond, F. (1903). Histoire populaire illustrée de la Champagne du Barrois et de la Brie (in French). Vol. I. Librairie Historique des Provinces.
