= Gilles I Aycelin de Montaigu =

French archbishop and diplomat

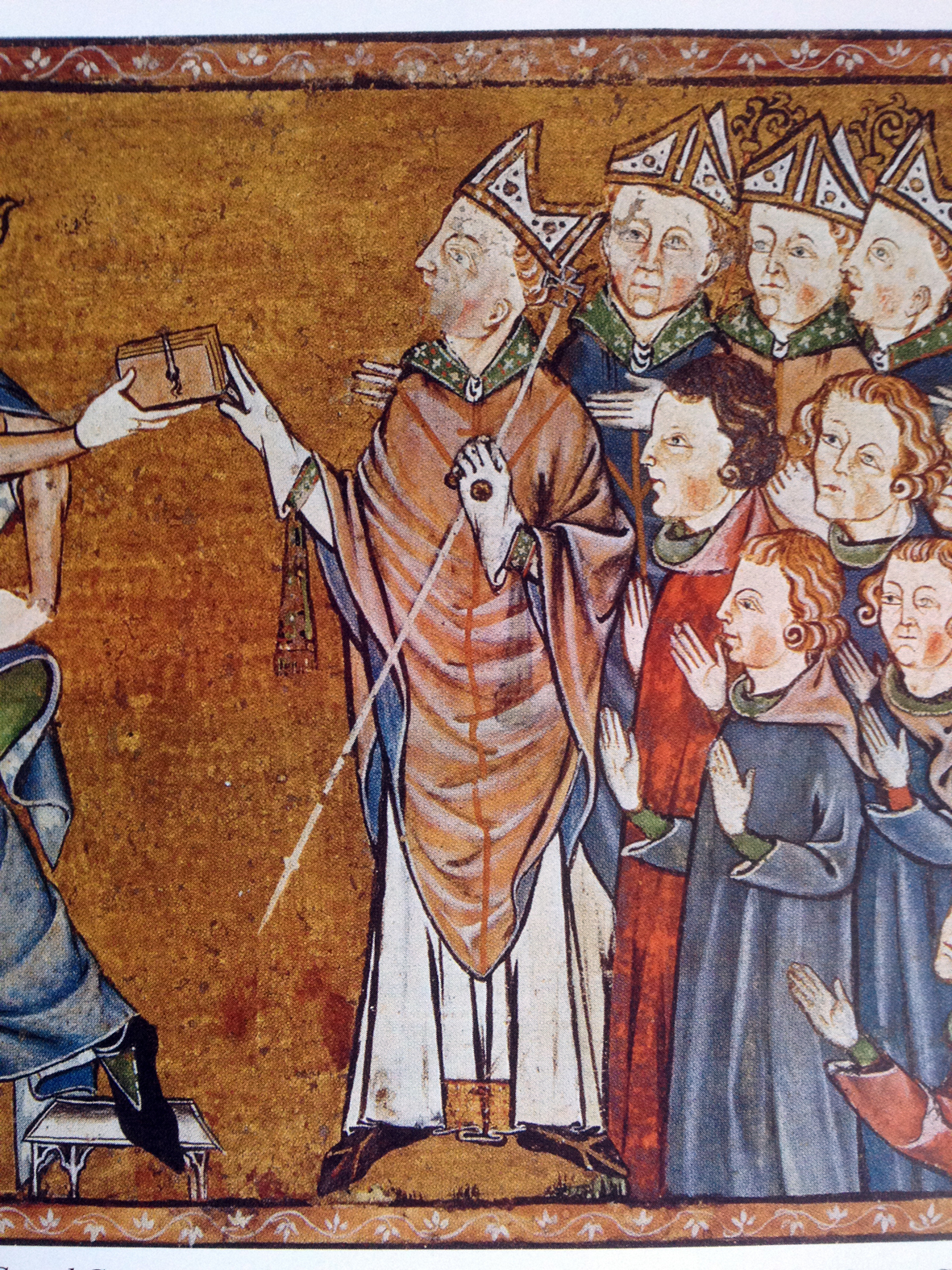
Gilles I Aycelin de Montaigu in 1315

Gilles I Aycelin de Montaigu or Montaigut (1252 – 23 June 1318), was a French Archbishop and diplomat who became Lord Chancellor of France.

Gilles I Aycelin de Montaigu was Archbishop of Narbonne (1287–1311) and Archbishop of Rouen (1311–1318). He was one of the most influential counselors of King Philip IV of France. He negotiated the Treaty of Tournai (1298) and Treaty of Montreuil (1299) with the English, and created the Collège de Montaigu in 1314.
