= Mary, Countess of Blois =

Countess of Blois from 1230–1241

Mary
- Countess of Blois
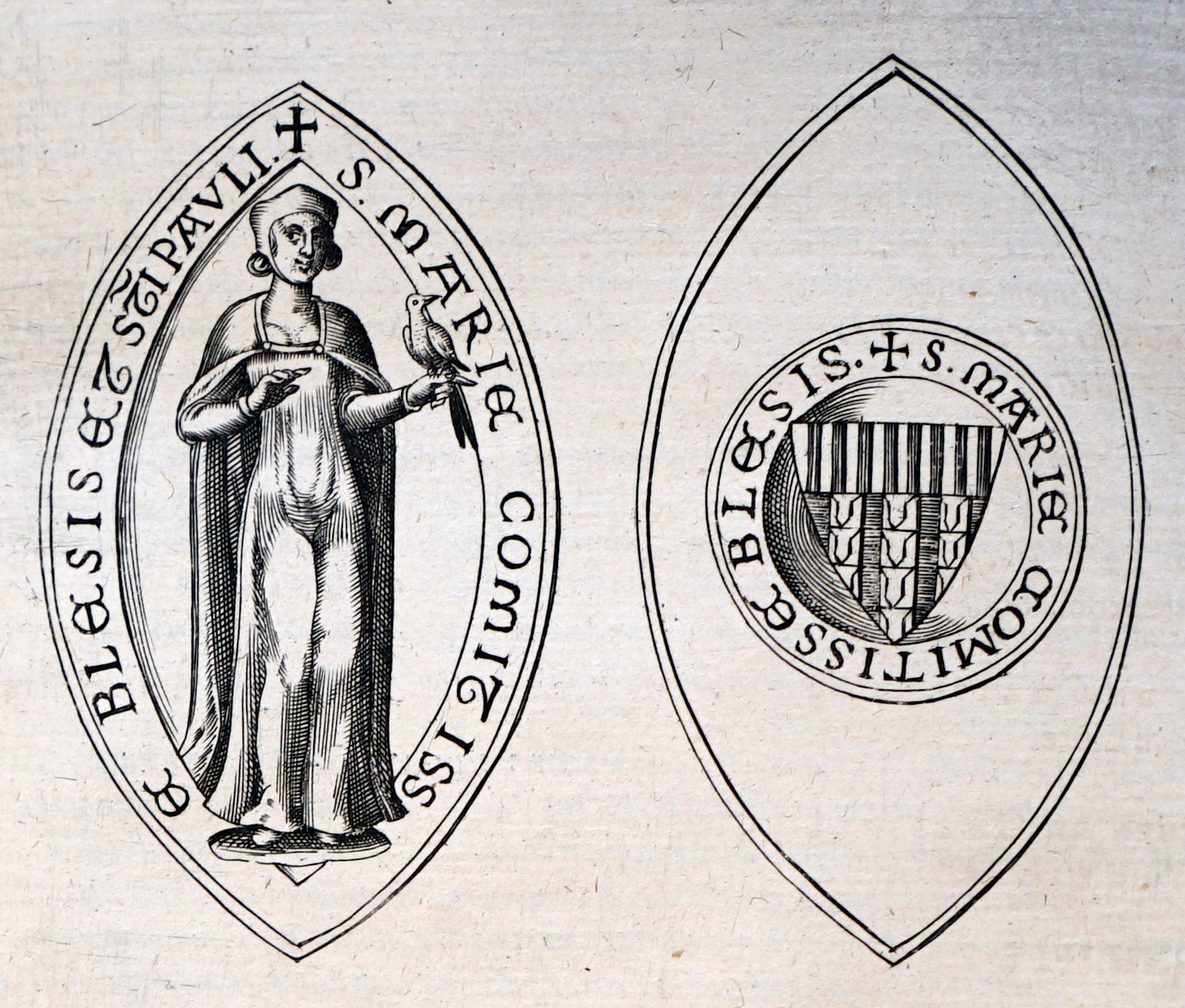
- Seal
- Born: 1200
- Died: 1241 (aged 40–41)
- Noble family: Avesnes
- Spouse: Hugh I of Châtillon (m. 1226)
- Issue: John I; Guy II; Gaucher; Hugh; Basile
- Father: Walter II of Avesnes
- Mother: Margaret of Blois

Mary, Countess of Blois, also known as Marie of Avesnes, (1200–1241) was countess of Blois from 1230 to 1241.

She was the daughter of Walter of Avesnes and Margaret of Blois.

In 1226, Mary married Hugh I of Châtillon, a count from Châtillon-sur-Marne, son of Gaucher III of Châtillon and Elisabeth of Saint-Pol. They had five children:

1. John I (died 1280), Count of Blois
2. Guy II (died 1289), Count of Saint Pol
3. Gaucher (died 1261), lord of Crécy and Crèvecœur
4. Hugh (died 1255)
5. Basile (died 1280), became Abbess of Notre Dame du Val in 1248.

Her eldest son, John, succeeded her in Blois.

Mary, Countess of Blois House of Avesnes Born: 1200 Died: 1241
Preceded by Margaret	Countess of Blois with Hugh I 1225–1241	Succeeded by John I
