= House of Châtillon =

Medieval French noble family (extinct)

The House of Châtillon was a notable French family, with origins in the 9th century. The name comes from that of Châtillon-sur-Marne in Champagne, where members of the family were tenants in a castle belonging to the Counts of Champagne. Gaucher V of Châtillon was lord of Châtillon from 1290 until 1303, when he became count of Porcien. The title was then sold to Louis of Valois, Duke of Orléans in 1400. Other branches of the family were in Saint-Pol-sur-Ternoise (extinguished in 1360), in Blois (extinguished in 1397), and in Penthièvre (extinguished in 1457).

Members of the house include:

- Odo of Châtillon, Pope under the name of Urban II
- Raynald of Châtillon (c. 1125–1187), Prince of Antioch (1153–1160/1161) and Lord of Oultrejordain (from 1175), a prominent Crusader leader known for his role in the Kingdom of Jerusalem and conflicts leading to the Battle of Hattin.
- Agnes of Antioch (c. 1154 – c. 1184), also known as Anna de Châtillon, daughter of Raynald of Châtillon and Constance of Antioch; Queen consort of Hungary as the first wife of Béla III of Hungary (m. 1172).
- Gaucher de Châtillon (1166–1219), Sénéchal of Burgundy, escorted Philip II of France to the Holy Land and distinguished himself at the siege of Acre and the battle of Bouvines.
- Gaucher V de Châtillon (1249–1329) great-grandson of the former, constable of France under Philip IV of France and minister of Louis X of France.
- Jeanne de Châtillon (c.1285–1354), Duchess of Athens.
- Jacques de Châtillon (-1302), died in the Battle of the Golden Spurs after fleeing a mob.
- Marie de St Pol (c.1303–1377), foundress of Pembroke College, Cambridge.
- Charles of Blois Châtillon (1319–1364), was canonized as saint, ruled over the Champagne branch. His claim to be Duke of Brittany, jure uxoris ignited the Breton War of Succession. His title would pass for a time to his descendants.
- Alix de Châtillon dit d'Antioche (Alisia of Antioch), married Azon d'Este V, Seigneur de Ferrare.

This house is totally distinct from the house of Châtillon-sur-Loing, which produced (among others) the Coligny brothers : Gaspard, François and cardinal Odet.
