= John I of Blois =

Coat of arms of Châtillon-sur-Marne (Gules, three pallets vair, a chief or)

John I of Châtillon (died 5 May 1280 in Chambord), was count of Blois from 1241 to 1280 and lord of Avesnes.

== Biography ==
He was the son of Hugh I of Châtillon and Marie of Avesnes.

In 1254, John married Alix of Brittany, Dame de Pontarcy (d. 1287), daughter of John I, Duke of Brittany and Blanche of Navarre. They had:

- Joan.

In 1256, he reunited Chartres with Blois on the death of his cousin Matilda of Amboise. He passed these lands on to Joan before his death.

John and his wife founded several religious institutions, including the Monastery of La Guiche.

In 1260 John granted the parish of Chouzy the right to organize a match of joule (a precursor of rugby) on Whitsun, a right that was practised for more than five centuries. It was an example for other parishes, who obtained similar privileges from their lords.

He was named Lieutenant General of France in 1270.

== Sources ==
- Pollock, M. A. (2015). Scotland, England and France After the Loss of Normandy, 1204-1296. The Boydell Press.

John I of Blois House of Blois
Preceded by Marie of Avesnes with Hugh I	Count of Blois; 1241–1280	Succeeded by Joan
Preceded by Marie of Avesnes with Hugh I	Lord of Avesnes; 1241–1280	Succeeded by Joan
Preceded by Matilda of Amboise	Count of Chartres; 1256–bef. 1278	Succeeded by Joan
