= Blanche of Navarre, Countess of Champagne =

Countess of Champagne

Blanche of Navarre
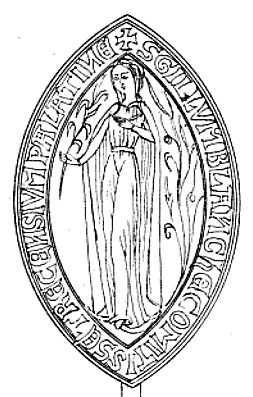
- Countess Blanche on her seal
- Born: c. 1177
- Died: c. 13 March 1229
- Spouse: Theobald III, Count of Champagne (m. 1199; died 1201)
- Issue: Theobald I of Navarre
- House: Jiménez
- Father: Sancho VI of Navarre
- Mother: Sancha of Castile

Blanche of Navarre (c. 1177–1229) was Countess of Champagne by marriage to Theobald III, Count of Champagne, and regent of Champagne during the minority of her son Theobald I of Navarre between 1201 and 1222. She was the daughter of Sancho VI of Navarre and Sancha of Castile.

== Life ==
=== Early life ===
Blanche was born c. 1177, the youngest daughter of King Sancho VI of Navarre and Sancha of Castile. Queen Sancha died in 1179.

Blanche's eldest brother, Sancho VII, succeeded their father and was the last agnatic descendant of the first dynasty of the kings of Navarre, the Pamplona dynasty, dying childless. Her elder sister Berengaria of Navarre married Richard I of England. Blanche of Navarre was also first cousin once removed to Blanche of Castile, who later became the queen of France as the wife of Louis VIII of France, and the two kept in contact.

Blanche married Theobald III, Count of Champagne, on 1 July 1199 at Chartres, when she was 22 years old and he was 20 years old.

=== Regent of Champagne ===
Theobald III died young on 24 May 1201, while preparing to lead the Fourth Crusade, leaving her nine months pregnant. When she gave birth to a son on 30 May 1201 in Troyes, he immediately became Theobald IV, Count of Champagne, nicknamed Theobald the Posthumous. Blanche ruled the county as regent until Theobald turned 21 years old in 1222.

During her regency, Blanche exacted oaths of loyalty, imposed homage on younger sons, issued charters to towns and installed castles. She was supported during the early years of her regency by Adela of Champagne, who had served as Regent of France. Adela gave her vital counsel before dying in 1206. Blanche made large monastic donations devoted to Adela's memory.

Blanche convened a baronial assembly in 1212, where she established procedures for daughters, rather than the closest male relative, to inherit castles and fortified residences if their fathers died without a son, with the barons' consent.

=== War of the Succession of Champagne ===
The regency was plagued by a number of difficulties, however, as Blanche's brother-in-law, Count Henry II had left behind a great deal of debt. Henry was the elder son but had transferred the land to his younger brother, Theobald III.

Furthermore, their son Theobald IV's right to the succession of Champagne was challenged by Henry's daughter Philippa of Champagne and her husband, Erard I of Brienne, Count of Ramerupt and one of the more powerful Champagne nobles, who had been living in the Holy Land. The conflict with the Briennes broke into open warfare in 1215, in what became known as the War of the Succession of Champagne, and was not resolved until after Theobald came of age in 1222.

After the death of her husband, however, Blanche had taken immediate action to secure the legal status of her son and the county of Champagne for him. She found King Philip II of France at Sens and paid him homage the week after her husband's funeral, which was the first homage rendered by a countess. She did this to maintain wardship and the right over her lands and in exchange she promised to not marry without the king's permission. Prince Louis (the future King Louis VIII of France) then proclaimed in a letter to John of Brienne, King of Jerusalem, that neither he nor King Philip would hear a challenge against Theobald IV's claim until he was twenty-one. In this letter, Prince Louis also confirmed that Henry II did indeed transfer the land to his brother. At that time Theobald and Blanche bought out their rights for a substantial monetary payment.

The papacy supported Blanche, declaring both Henry II's marriage invalid and Erard and Philippa within the prohibited degrees of kinship. Pope Innocent III issued interdicts and excommunicated rebel barons. His successor Pope Honorius III also prohibited Erard and Philippa from continuing their demands with arms, under penalty of excommunication. Erard renounced any claim on Champagne on 2 November 1221 and Philippa in April 1222.

Blanche had also arranged the dowry of Henry II's elder daughter Alice of Champagne, when she married the young Hugh I of Cyprus. In the 1230s, in order to settle with Alice, Theobald IV had to sell his overlordship over the counties of Blois, Sancerre, and Châteaudun to Louis IX of France.

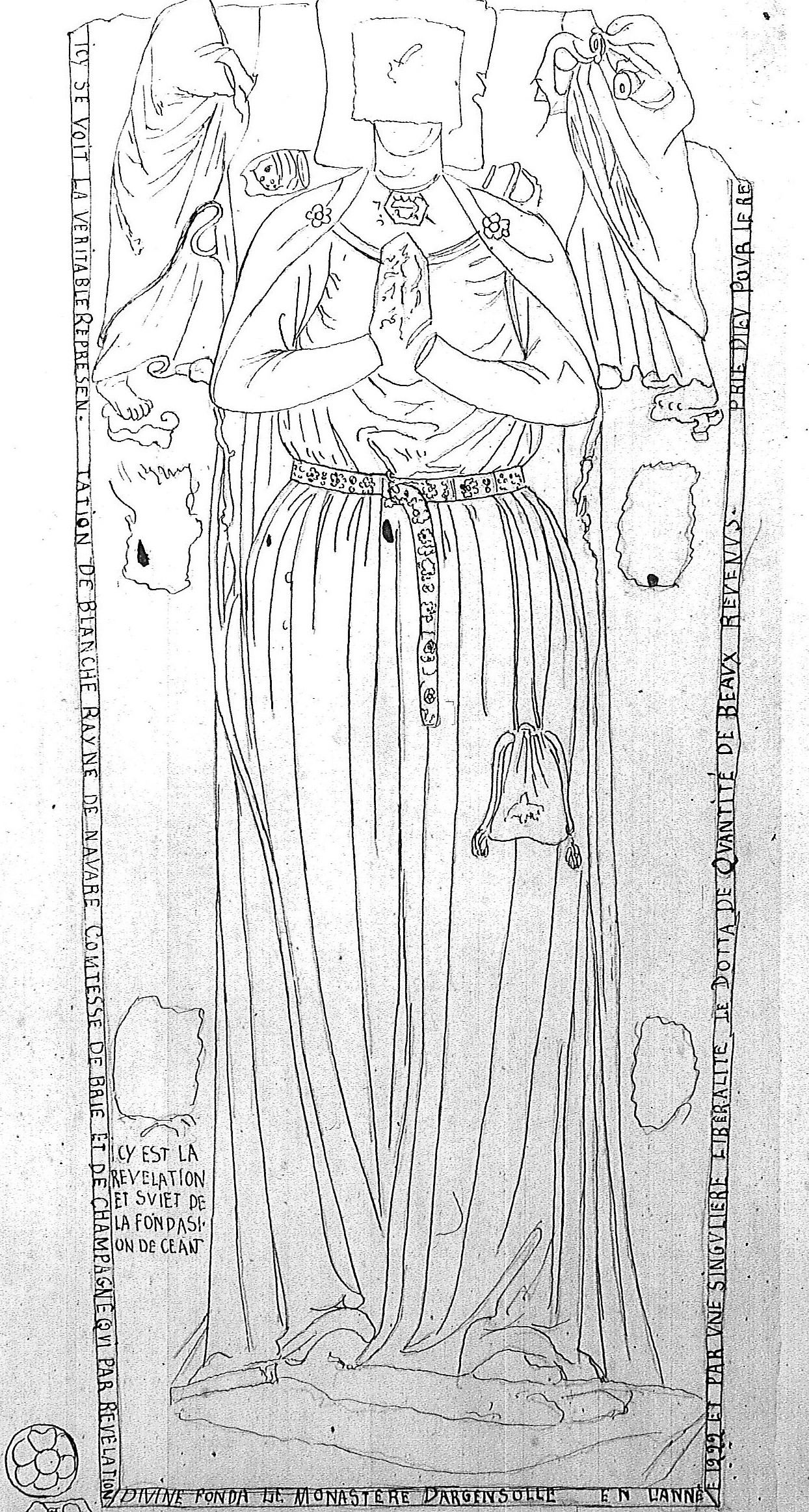
tomb effigy of Blanche de Navarre, initially at the Cistercian convent of Argentolles, then moved to Châlons-en-Champagne

=== Later years ===
With her regency completed, in 1222 Blanche withdrew to the Cistercian convent of Argensolles, whose foundation she had funded herself, for her retirement.

Since some barons suspected Theobald for having a hand in the death of Louis VIII (in November 1226), Blanche of Castile withdrew his invitation to the coronation of Louis IX and proffered it to Blanche instead.

Blanche died on 13 March 1229, seven years after the end of her regency, at the age of 52. In her will she left 5 marks of gold to the Cathedral of Reims, which was used to build a statue to contain the Holy Milk of the Virgin. She was buried at the Cistercian convent of Argensolles.

After Blanche's death, her brother in retirement remained as King of Navarre and her son Theobald continued as Count of Champagne. Their eldest sister, Berengaria of Navarre, Queen of England (widow of Richard the Lionheart), died without issue in 1230, leaving Sancho as the sole surviving child of Sancho VI. When he died in 1234, Blanca's son Theobald IV of Champagne was recognized as the next King of Navarre. Theobald had married twice during Blanche's lifetime, to Gertrude of Dagsburg, then Agnes of Beaujeu, and had one daughter by the time of her death, who was also named Blanche of Navarre.

== Children ==
Blanche had two children with Theobald III of Champagne:

1. Marie – Blanche is noted as having borne an older daughter named Marie to Theobald III before his death in May 1201. References to this Marie in documentation are scant, but as Blanche was married in July 1199, Marie would have been under two years old at the time of her father's death. One of the conditions of Blanche's treaty with Philip II confirming her son's inheritance was that Marie had to be sent away to be raised in the royal court at Paris.
2. Theobald I of Navarre.
