= Alice of Brittany, Countess of Blois =

Breton noblewoman (1243–1288)

Alix
- Dame de Pontarcy suo jure Countess of Blois
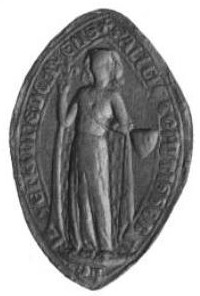
- Medallion of Alix
- Born: 6 June 1243; Château de Suscinio, Sarzeau, Morbihan, Brittany
- Died: 2 August 1288 (aged 45)
- Burial: Monastery of La Guiche, Chouzy-sur-Cisse, France
- Spouse: John I, Count of Blois
- Issue: Jeanne, Countess of Blois
- House: Dreux
- Father: John I, Duke of Brittany
- Mother: Blanche of Navarre

Alix of Brittany, Dame de Pontarcy, Countess of Blois (6 June 1243 – 2 August 1288), was a Breton noblewoman and a member of the House of Dreux as the eldest daughter of John I, Duke of Brittany and Blanche of Navarre. She married John I, Count of Blois. Alix was known for founding religious houses including the Monastery of La Guiche, where she was later buried.

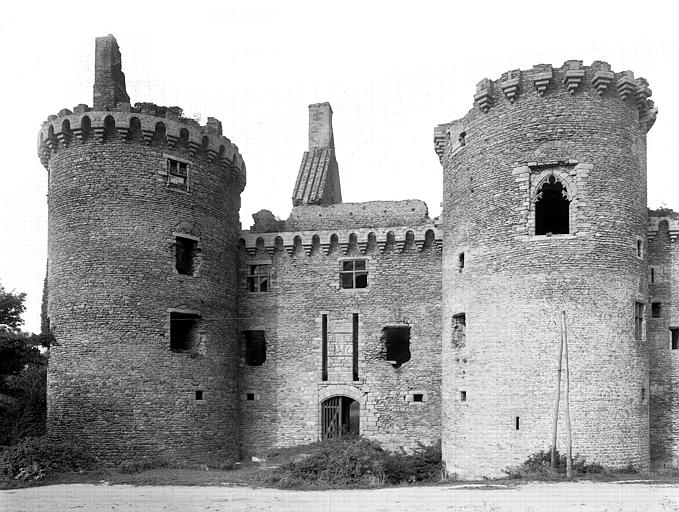
Château de Suscinio, in, Sarzeau, Morbihan, birthplace of Alix of Brittany

Alix, named after her paternal grandmother, Alix of Thouars, was born on 6 June 1243 at the Château de Suscinio in Sarzeau, Morbihan, Brittany. She was the eldest daughter of John I, Duke of Brittany and Blanche of Navarre, daughter of Theobald I of Navarre and Agnes of Beaujeu. Alix held the title Dame de Pontarcy in her own right.

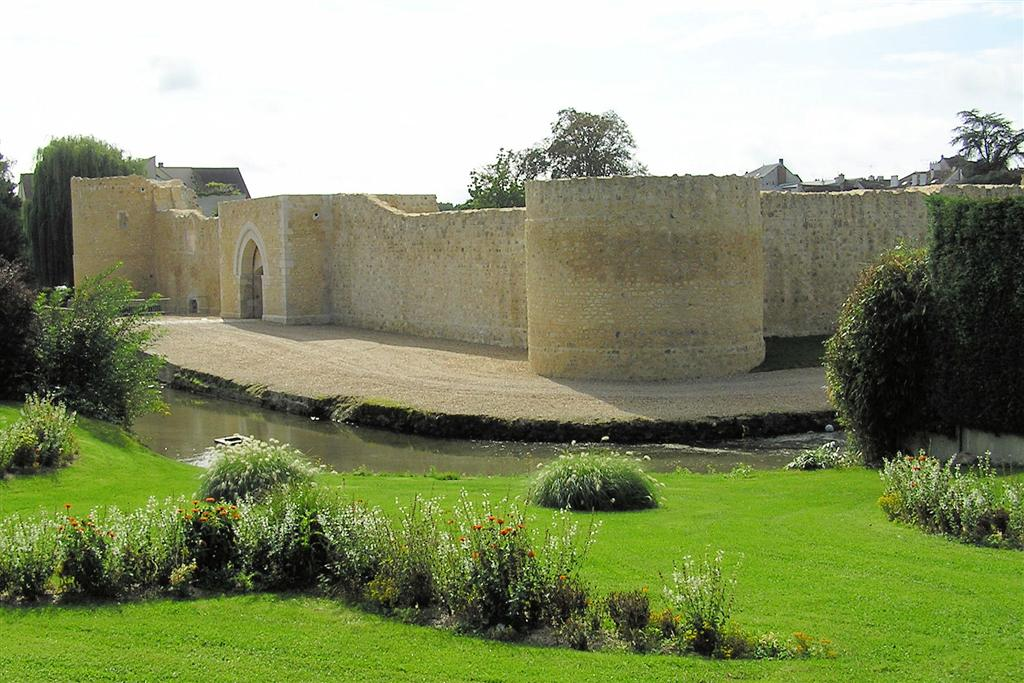
Château de Brie-Comte-Robert

Sometime after a contract was signed on 11 December 1254, she married John I, Count of Blois of the House of Châtillon. Thereafter she was styled Countess of Blois. She brought as her dowry her titles of Pontarcy and de Brie-Comte-Robert, which had been named after her ancestor Robert I of Dreux. The marriage produced one child, a daughter Jeanne, who was heiress to her father's title and estates. In 1270, her husband was appointed Lieutenant General of France.

Through Alix's marriage to John, the Château de Brie-Comte-Robert passed to the Châtillon family.

Alix and John founded several religious houses including the Monastery of La Guiche near Blois in 1277. She became a widow on 28 June 1279. In 1287, the year before her own death, Alix travelled to Palestine. From there she journeyed on to Syria, where she commissioned the erection of two barbican towers at Ptolemais.

== Death ==
Alix died on 2 August 1288 and was buried in the Monastery of La Guiche which she had founded. Her father, Duke John had died just two years earlier. Her daughter, Jeanne, who was the suo jure Countess of Blois had married Peter, Count of Perche and Alençon, a son of King Louis IX of France and Margaret of Provence. However, as her two sons by that marriage both died in early infancy, Alix's line became extinct upon her death.

== Sources ==
- Morvan, Frederic (2009). La Chevalerie bretonne et la formation de l'armee ducale, 1260-1341 (in French). Presses Universitaires de Rennes.

Alice of Brittany, Countess of Blois House of Dreux cadet branch of Capetian dynasty
Preceded by House of Dreux	Dame de Pont-Arcy	Succeeded by Jeanne de Blois
