= War of the Succession of Champagne =

Military conflict

| Date | 1216–1222 |
| Location | County of Champagne (mostly concentrated in southeastern Champagne), Duchy of Lorraine, Alsace |
| Result | Theobald IV succeeds as count, Countess-Regent Blanche centralizes authority over local barons |
| Territorial changes | Champagne secures control over local barons east of the Marne river; Champagne's borders extended east at the expense of Lorraine |

Belligerents
| Count of Champagne; Kingdom of France; Holy Roman Empire; Duchy of Burgundy; County of Bar medieval Papacy | Most of the local barons in the eastern and southern borderlands of Champagne, united under Erard of Brienne claiming succession by marrying Theobald IV's cousin Philippa. Duchy of Lorraine |

Commanders and leaders
| Blanche of Navarre, Countess-Regent of Champagne; Theobald IV of Champagne; King Philip II of France; Frederick II, Holy Roman Emperor; Duke Odo III of Burgundy; Count Henry II of Bar; Pope Innocent III | Erard of Brienne-Ramerupt; Theobald I, Duke of Lorraine; Simon of Joinville |

The War of the Succession of Champagne was a war from 1216 to 1222 between the nobles of the Champagne region of France, occurring within that region and also spilling over into neighboring duchies. The war lasted two years and de facto ended in 1218, but did not officially end until Theobald IV reached the age of majority in 1222, at which point his rivals abandoned their claims.

== Origins ==
In 1190, Henry II, count of Champagne, left his county for the Crusades with his two uncles Philip II of France and Richard I of England (Henry's mother was the daughter of Louis VII of France and Eleanor of Aquitaine, and thus half-sister to Philip via her father and to Richard via her mother). He made the barons of Champagne swear to pay homage to his brother Theobald if he should die on Crusade.

In the Holy Land, Henry was crowned king of Jerusalem and - to reinforce his legitimacy - married for the second time to queen Isabella, second wife and widow of Conrad of Montferrat, despite the fact that her first husband (from whom she had been forced to separate) was still alive. Henry and Isabella had three daughters and no surviving sons and so, when Henry II died in 1197, his brother inherited the county as Theobald III. Theobald III then died of a sudden illness four years later in 1201 while preparing to lead the Fourth Crusade, leaving his widow Blanche of Navarre nine months pregnant with their son Theobald IV, born after his father's death.

In 1215 Henry II's third daughter Philippa of Champagne married a nobleman from Champagne living in the Holy Land. His name was Erard of Brienne-Ramerupt, and he was a cousin of John of Brienne, king of Jerusalem. It was he who gave Philippa the idea of claiming the County of Champagne.

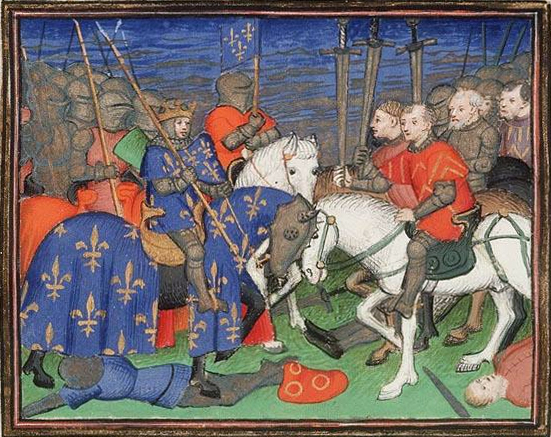
King Philip II's victory at Bouvines

Blanche of Navarre, however, proved to be an incredibly strong and efficient regent, and had devoted herself for the past 15 years to ensuring the legal status of her son Theobald IV as rightful heir. Blanche was aided in securing her powerbase during the first few shakey years of her regency by the fact that so many lords and knights of the county, who might have posed a challenge to her, had left to fight on the Fourth Crusade from 1202 to 1204. Queen Mother Adèle of Champagne (who was Theobald III's aunt) also took Blanche under her wing, giving Blanche vital counsel during the early years of her regency until Adèle's death in 1206 (for the rest of her life, Blanche would make large monastic donations devoted to Adèle's memory).

By 1216, despite the fact that Erard rallied most of the local barons of the county against Blanche, she had built up such strong alliances with both King Philip II as well as Pope Innocent III that Erard never gained any official legal support for his claims. From the start of the conflict, Pope Innocent III began excommunicating rebel barons, negatively affecting their efforts. Further, while Theobald IV was still an underaged youth of 13 years, he had acquitted himself so valiantly in combat at the decisive Battle of Bouvines that King Philip II threw his full support behind him (though this was also the culmination of over a decade of Blanche cementing an alliance with the monarchy, through financial ties and homage).

== Course ==
=== Beginning maneuvers (1216) ===
Erard and Philippa landed in France in January 1216. On their journey to Le Puy-en-Velay, Erard was arrested by agents of the king of France but managed to escape and get to Champagne. Erard and his supporters took up a position in Noyers, which Blanche of Navarre then besieged in April 1216. That same month Erard accepted a truce and submitted the matter to the king of France for arbitration.

In July 1216, King Philip II finally heard Erard's suit at Melun, but ruled in Blanche's favor due to the overwhelming evidence she provided: the barons of the realm had sworn to support Theobald III should Henry II not return from the Holy Land, Theobald III had done homage to the king in 1198, Blanche had done homage to the king in 1201, and Theobald IV himself had made an innovative "anticipatory homage" in 1214. Blanche even provided numerous letters patent, bearing the seals of the barons who had sworn homage. Philip II ordained that the barons await the majority of Theobald IV and his assumption of his rights as count (when he turned 21 years old in May 1222). Philip II ordered Erard and the barons to seal their own letters patent confirming the court's decision and promising to observe a truce.

=== Open rebellion (1217) ===
No sooner had Erard returned to his holdings in Champagne than he and his rebel supporters quickly broke the truce and took up arms against Blanche. In spring 1217 war began in earnest and the local barons of Champagne, all more or less supporting Philippa, abandoned Blanche to rally to Erard. Theobald I, Duke of Lorraine took on Erard's cause, as did his brother-in-law Miles, Seigneur de Noyers, and his nephew André de Pougy, Seigneur de Marolles-sur-Seine and de Saint Valérien. The support of the Duke of Lorraine added a substantial amount of strength to the rebel forces.

Most of the fighting was concentrated in southeastern Champagne, as Blanche's forces pushed east from her capital at Troyes on the Seine river, to rebel fortresses on the Aube river (Erard's holding at Ramerupt north of Troyes) and further east on the Marne river (Joinville and Langres). Two of Blanche's most dangerous enemies were the brothers William and Simon of Joinville, both of whom broke peace treaties they had made with Blanche in 1214 to switch to Erard's side. Simon of Joinville was Blanche's own seneschal (though he had obtained the office through hereditary right, not appointment by Blanche). William was the bishop of Langres to the southeast, who also held overlordship of the county of Bar-sur-Aube.

Apart from various sieges, during the early part of the conflict Erard and his rebel barons attacked merchant caravans traveling to the Champagne fairs at Troyes and Bar-sur-Aube. However, each side soon realized that they did not want to disrupt this vital source of monetary income. During the later years of the war, therefore, Erard would agree to truces with Blanche that would last weeks or months at a time, in order for the trade fairs to occur unmolested. In return, Blanche would pay off Erard with a large fraction of the revenue from the comital taxes exacted from the trade fairs.

=== Foreign intervention and climax (1218) ===
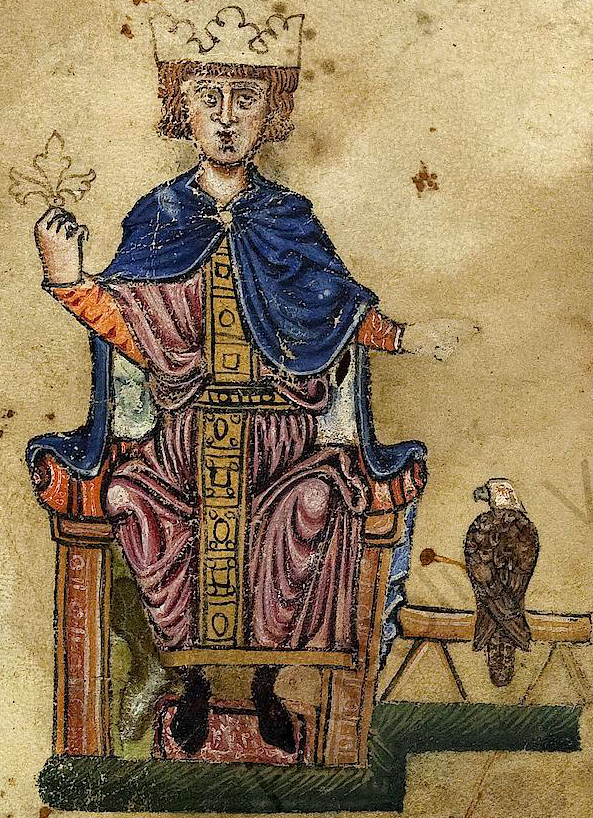
Emperor Frederick II

The rebellion remained a localized affair, largely driven by the self-interest of the local barons, though by spring 1218 it attracted the intervention of Blanche's liege-lords King Philip II of France and Odo III, Duke of Burgundy, as well as Frederick II, Holy Roman Emperor. Duke Theobald I of Lorraine had sided with rival Holy Roman Emperor Otto IV against Frederick II during the recent round of civil wars in Germany, thus their entry on opposite sides of the conflict was an extension of Hohenstaufen-Welf antagonisms.

Emperor Frederick II, the suzerain of Lorraine, considered it a felony for Duke Theobald I of Lorraine to support a candidate he opposed, so he occupied the city of Rosheim, which he had given to Theobald I's father. Theobald I responded in 1218, retaking Rosheim and then ravaging Alsace, particularly Frederick II's vineyards. Nonetheless Theobald I lost Rosheim again when a pro-Frederick II uprising in the city killed the Lorraine garrison (massacring them in their cellars after inviting them down to sample their wines).

After two years, the papal excommunications and interdicts had also taken their toll, isolating the rebel barons. The Church's prelates in Champagne aided Blanche at the order of Pope Innocent III, with the notable exception of William, bishop of Langres, who ignored papal orders to excommunicate his own brother Simon.

Blanche's forces ravaged the lands of her traitorous seneschal Simon of Joinville, and she imposed a humiliating surrender agreement: Simon's fortresses were seized, his eldest son Geoffroy was taken hostage, and Simon was forced to transfer his ancestral castle at Joinville to his brother Bishop William as security for his good conduct.

The entry of Burgundy and Bar into the war began to turn the tide against the rebels. With the aid of Duke Odo III of Burgundy and Count Henry II of Bar, Countess-Regent Blanche rode with her army to Lorraine's capital of Nancy in 1218 and burned the town. Blanche then joined with Emperor Frederick II to besiege the castle of Amance. Duke Theobald I of Lorraine surrendered Amance by the end of May 1218, and officially renewed his fidelity to Blanche on June 1, at which point the rebellion largely collapsed and rebel barons started making their own separate peaces.

=== Securing the peace (1218-1222) ===
Theobald I of Lorraine died in May 1220 under mysterious circumstances, and to seal the peace the 19-year-old Theobald IV of Champagne married Lorraine's 16-year-old widow, Gertrude of Dagsburg. Duke Theobald I's brother Matthew II, who succeeded in Lorraine, made peace and swore fealty to Blanche. Bishop William of Langres was elected archbishop of Reims in 1219, resulting in his fortuitous departure from the conflict. Erard renounced any claim on Champagne on 2 November 1221 and Philippa in April 1222. In return for renouncing his claims, Erard received a substantial cash settlement. The last rebel baron, Erard II of Chacernay, swore his renewed loyalty to Theobald IV in March 1222. Two months later in May 1222, Theobald IV reached the age of maturity and began his reign as count, and the triumphant Countess-Regent Blanche withdrew to the Cistercian convent of Argensolles for her retirement.

== Aftermath ==
Blanche and Theobald IV had centralized comital authority within Champagne, reining in the rebellious local barons and ending any pretensions of collegiate rule in the county. Theobald IV promptly divorced Gertrude as soon as he came of age and peace was secured, terminating their brief two-year-long and childless marriage, in order to marry Agnes of Beaujeu.

Theobald IV's rule was initially marked by a series of misfortunes: he was accused of abandoning King Louis VIII at the siege of Avignon (1226), costing him the royal alliance he had relied on to secure his inheritance. Moreover, strong rumors began to spread that Theobald IV was having an affair with Louis VIII's widow, the Queen Regent Blanche of Castile (ruled 1226-1234), for whom he composed a poetic homage (Blanche of Castile and Theobald IV's father Theobald III were both grandchildren of Eleanor of Aquitaine). Theobald IV was becoming increasingly influential at court, and the other great counts of France were becoming resentful (it is entirely possible that the rumors of an affair with the queen regent were indeed unfounded, and merely fabricated by other barons jealous of his position at court). In general, the other barons were jealous of the strengthened County of Champagne which had emerged from the succession war, and now presented a major rival to surrounding areas.

Whatever the case, the resentful other barons invaded Champagne from 1229-1230. Ironically, the alliances in the invasion were reversed from the arrangement they had been in during the succession war: Count Henry II of Bar attacked Champagne from the east, prompting Theobald IV to ally with Lorraine to attack the County of Bar. Simon of Joinville, who had fought for the rebel faction during the succession war, now allied with Theobald IV against the external threat, and aided him in ravaging Bar, which was on the northern border of Joinville's own lands. The conflict with the County of Bar prompted the more powerful Duchy of Burgundy to invade Champagne from the south, led by Duke Hugh IV (his father Odo III, Countess Blanche's staunch ally, had died in 1218). This provoked Queen Blanche to intervene, in order to stop the spread of the conflict.

Theobald IV was able to repulse the attackers, but at great cost. Champagne's economy was so depleted by these two major wars, as well as the crusading debts of Theobald IV's father and uncle, that Theobald IV had to sell off his overlordship of the counties west of Paris that his ancestors held before expanding east to Champagne: Blois, Sancerre, and Chateaudun. Another major blow to morale came near the start of the invasion of 1229, when Blanche of Navarre died (of natural causes) while in retirement at Argensolles convent. Moreover, Theobald IV's second wife Agnes of Beaujeu suddenly died in 1231, leaving Theobald IV with only their five-year-old daughter, Blanche. This left Champagne in need of a male heir, prompting Theobald IV to remarry in 1232 to Margaret of Bourbon. The situation reached its nadir in 1233, when Henry II's elder daughter Queen Alice of Cyprus threatened to reprise the succession war of Theobald IV's minority yet again. Alice had become queen of Cyprus by marrying her stepbrother Hugh I of Cyprus in 1210.

However, the fortunes of Theobald IV and Champagne dramatically shifted soon afterward, when in 1234 he became king of Navarre on the death of his uncle (after successfully outmaneuvering James I of Aragon's attempt to succeed in Navarre). Suddenly, Theobald IV became too wealthy and powerful for neighboring counts to risk fighting. This also ended Alice of Cyprus's attempt to renew the succession war, and she was paid off with a substantial cash settlement. Alice was at this time engaged in the War of the Lombards against Blanche's old ally Emperor Frederick II, so it is possible that Alice did not want to fight two wars at once, and wanted to concentrate on the direct threat to Cyprus itself.

== Sources ==
- Bradbury, Jim (2007). The Capetians: Kings of France, 987-1328. Hambledon Continuum.
- Hallam, Elizabeth M. (1990). Capetian France, 987-1328. Longman.
- Evergates, Theodore. The Aristocracy in the County of Champagne, 1100-1300. Philadelphia: University of Pennsylvania Press: 2007.
