= Yolande of Brittany =

French noblewoman (1218–1272)

- Countess of Penthrièvre and Porhoet
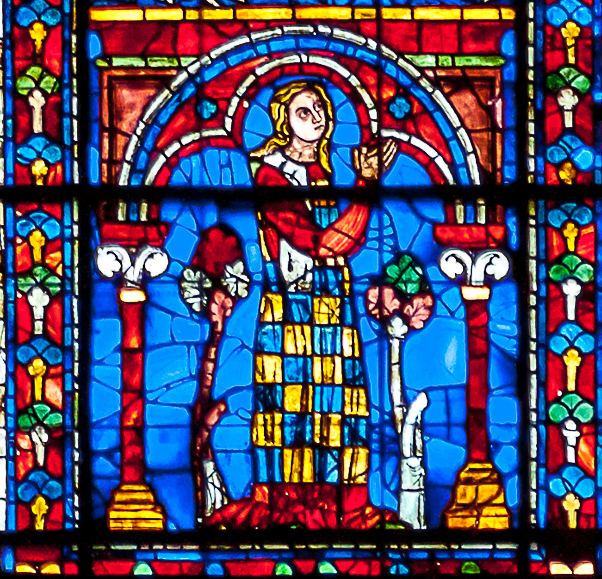
- Yolande of Brittany represented on a window in Chartres Cathedral
- Born: late 1218; Dreux, France
- Died: 10 October 1272; Chateau of Bouteville, Charente, France
- Noble family: Dreux
- Spouses: Hugh XI of Lusignan, Count of La Marche and Angoulême
- Issue: Hugh XII of Lusignan, Count of La Marche and Angoulême; Guy of Lusignan; Geoffroy of Lusignan; Alice of Lusignan; Isabelle of Lusignan; Marie of Lusignan; Yolande of Lusignan
- Father: Peter of Dreux
- Mother: Alix, Duchess of Brittany

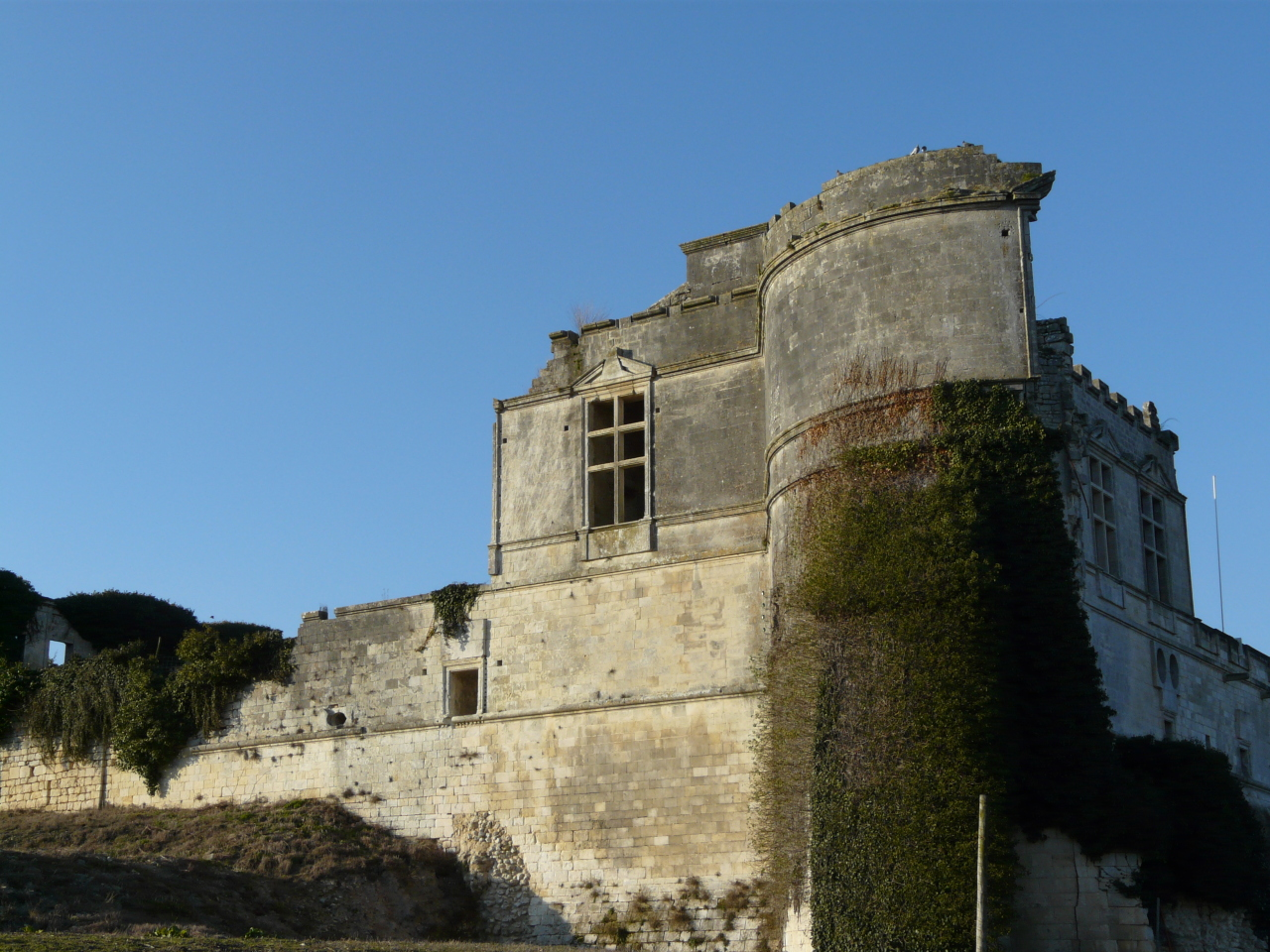
Chateau de Bouteville, Charente, where Yolande died in 1272

Yolande of Brittany (late 1218 – 10 October 1272), also known as Yolande de Dreux, was the ruler of the counties of Penthièvre and Porhoet in the Duchy of Brittany. Yolande had been betrothed to King Henry III of England in 1226 at the age of seven years, but married Hugh XI of Lusignan, the half-brother of Henry III. Through Hugh, she became Countess of La Marche and of Angoulême. She was the mother of seven children. From 1250 to 1256, she acted as Regent of La Marche and Angoulême for her son, Hugh XII of Lusignan.

== Life ==
Yolande was born in Dreux, France at the end of 1218, the only daughter of Alix, Duchess of Brittany, and her husband Pierre de Dreux. She had two brothers, John I, Duke of Brittany and Arthur of Brittany (1220–1224). By her father's second marriage to Nicole, she had a half-brother, Olivier de Braine (1231–1279). Her mother, Alix, had died on 21 October 1221, when Yolande was not quite three years old. Yolande's paternal grandparents were Robert II, Count of Dreux and Yolande de Coucy, and her maternal grandparents were Guy de Thouars and Constance, Duchess of Brittany.

=== Suo Jure Countess ===
As her dowry, In 1236 Yolande received the titles of Countess of Penthièvre, Dame de la Fère-en-Tardenois, de Chailly, and de Longjumeau which she held suo jure from her father Pierre, who was acting as regent for Yolande's brother John. Her father and brother also granted her the title of suo jure Countess of Porhoet.

Sometime before 19 October 1226, when she was seven years old, Yolande was betrothed to King Henry III of England. (Note: A letter of the King dated 19 October 1226 confirms Henry III's betrothal to Jolentam filiam Petri ducis Brittanniae et comitis Richemundiae) The marriage never took place. (Note: King Henry III of England eventually married Eleanor of Provence.) Blanche, regent of France, wanted to prevent Henry from gaining land or influence in France, and so forced Yolande's father to change her betrothal. Under this influence, Yolande's second betrothal occurred in March 1227 to John of France, Count of Anjou, the son of King Louis VIII of France and Blanche. The engagement was ended when John died aged thirteen in 1232.

Yolande was affianced a third time in 1231 to Theobald IV, Count of Champagne. As in the case with King Henry and John of France, this betrothal to Theobald also did not result in marriage. (Note: Theobald's daughter Blanche however married Yolande's brother John in 1236.)

In January 1236 she married Hugh XI of Lusignan. Hugh XI succeeded his father in 1249 as Count of La Marche and Count of Angoulême. His uterine half-brother was King Henry III of England, to whom Yolande had been betrothed in 1226.

=== Regency ===
Yolande's husband Hugh XI was killed at the Battle of Fariskur in Egypt on 6 April 1250. Yolande acted as Regent of La Marche and Angoulême for her eldest son Hugh from 1250 to 1256.

=== Death ===
Yolande died at the Chateau de Bouteville, Charente on 10 October 1272. She was buried at the Notre Dame Abbey in Villeneuve-lez-Nantes.

Upon her death, her Breton ennoblements returned to the House of Dreux when the titles of Count of Penthievre and Porhoet were seized by her brother, John I, Duke of Brittany.

== Issue ==
Together Hugh and Yolande had seven children:

- Hugh XII of Lusignan, Count of La Marche and Count of Angoulême (died after 25 August 1270), married 29 January 1254 Jeanne de Fougères, Dame de Fougères by whom he had six children. He died while on crusade.
- Guy of Lusignan, (died 1288/89), Seigneur de Cognac, d'Archiac, and de Couhé; Seigneur de la Fère-en-Tardenois.
- Geoffroy of Lusignan (died 1264)
- Alice of Lusignan (died May 1290), married in 1253 as his first wife, Gilbert de Clare, 6th Earl of Gloucester, by whom she had two daughters.
- Marie of Lusignan (1242- after 11 July 1266), married Robert de Ferrers, 6th Earl of Derby. She died childless.
- Isabelle of Lusignan, Dame de Belleville (1248–1304), married Maurice de Belleville
- Yolande of Lusignan (died 10 November 1305), married Pierre I, Sire de Preaux

== Sources ==
- Davenport, Millia (1975). The Secular Spirit: Life and Art at the End of the Middle Ages. The Metropolitan Museum of Art.
- Painter, Sidney (February 1937). "The Historical Setting of Robert veez de Perron". Modern Language Notes. 52 (2). The Johns Hopkins University Press: 83–87. doi:10.2307/2911568. ISSN 0149-6611. JSTOR 2911568.
- Pernoud, Régine (1975). Blanche of Castile. Coward, McCann & Geoghegan. ISBN 978-0-698-10595-9.
- Pollock, M.A. (2015). Scotland, England and France after the Loss of Normandy, 1204-1296. The Boydell Press.
- Richard, Jean (1983). Lloyd, Simon (ed.). Saint Louis: Crusader King of France. Translated by Birrell, Jean. Cambridge University Press.

Preceded by vacant	Countess of Penthièvre suo jure 1237–1272	Succeeded by John I
Preceded by vacant	Countess of Porhoët suo jure 1237–1272	Succeeded by John I
