= Theobald, Count of Champagne =

Theobald, Count of Champagne may refer to:

- Theobald I of Champagne, Theobald III of Blois, 1012–1089
- Theobald II of Champagne, also Theobald IV, Count of Blois, 1090–1152
- Theobald III, Count of Champagne, 1179–1201
- Theobald IV of Champagne, also Theobald I of Navarre, 1201/1234–1253
- Theobald V of Champagne, also Theobald II of Navarre, 1238/1253–1270
