= Theobald I =

Theobald I may refer to:

- Theobald I, King of Austrasia, ruled 548-555
- Theobald I, Count of Blois, ruled 928–975
- Theobald I, Count of Champagne ruled 1037–1089
- Theobald I, Duke of Lorraine (c. 1191 – 1220)
- Theobald I, King of Navarre ruled 1234–1253
