= Erard of Brienne =

Erard of Brienne may refer to:

- Erard I of Brienne (c. 1090 – c. 1120?), count of Brienne
- Erard II of Brienne (died 1191), count of Brienne and grandson of the above
- Erard of Brienne-Ramerupt (c. 1170 – 1246), nephew of the above; frequently referred to himself as "Erard of Brienne" in his letters
