= Philippa of Champagne =

- Lady of Ramerupt and de Vénisy
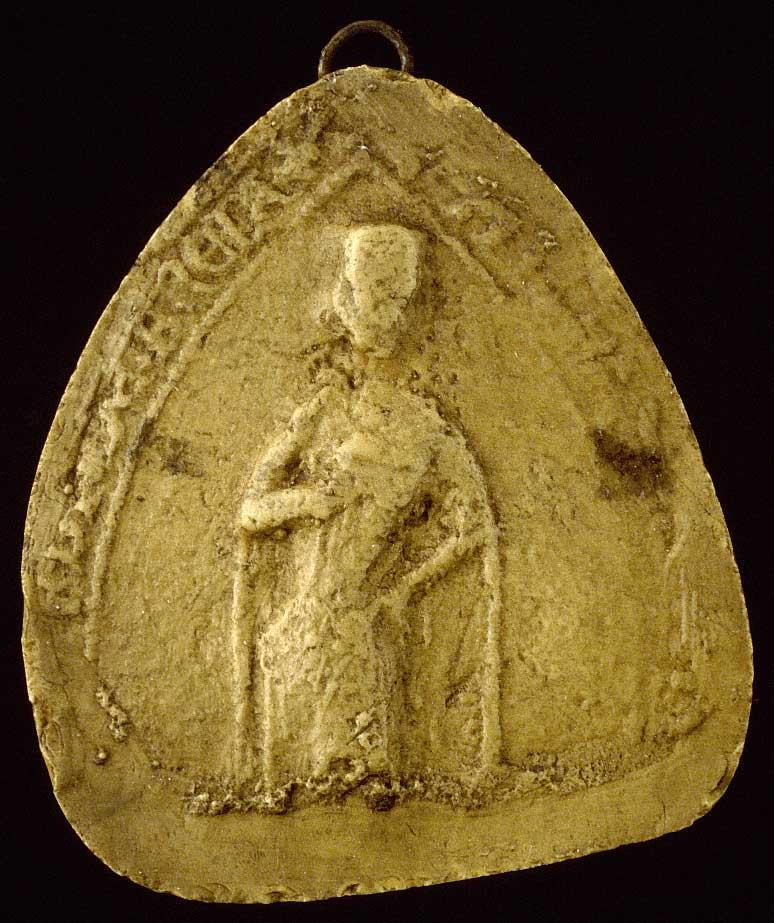
- Philippa of Champagne's seal
- Born: c. 1197; Holy Land
- Died: 20 December 1250 (aged about 53)
- Spouse: Erard de Brienne-Ramerupt (m. 1214; died 1246)
- Issue Detail: 9
- House: House of Blois; House of Blois-Champagne
- Father: Henry II, Count of Champagne
- Mother: Isabella I, Queen of Jerusalem
- Religion: Roman Catholic

Philippa of Champagne (French: Philippe de Champagne) (c. 1197 – 20 December 1250) was the third daughter of Queen Isabella I of Jerusalem and Count Henry II of Champagne. She was the wife of Erard de Brienne-Ramerupt, who encouraged her in 1216 to claim the county of Champagne which belonged to her cousin Theobald IV, who was still a minor. This provoked the conflict with Theobald's mother, the Regent, Blanche of Navarre, which erupted into open warfare, and came to be known as the Champagne War of Succession. Blanche's son Theobald, who had the support of King Philip II of France, Frederick II, Holy Roman Emperor, and Eudes III of Burgundy, eventually emerged the victor. Philippa renounced her claim in April 1222, but Theobald was constrained to pay Erard and Philippa a large monetary settlement for his rights to the county.

== Family ==
Philippa was born in about 1197 in the Holy Land, the youngest daughter of Queen Isabella I of Jerusalem and Count Henry II of Champagne. She had two older sisters, Margaret (died as a child) and Alice of Champagne, who was the wife of King Hugh I of Cyprus. Philippa had an older half-sister Maria of Montferrat from her mother's second marriage to Conrad of Montferrat. In the year of Philippa's birth her father was killed after falling from a first floor window in Acre. The county of Champagne passed to his brother Theobald III. Following his death, Philippa's mother married her fourth husband, King Amalric II of Jerusalem. The marriage produced three half-siblings for Philippa: Sybilla, Melisende, and Amalric. In 1205, her mother, stepfather, and infant half-brother all died, leaving Philippa an orphan at the age of eight. Her eldest half-sister, Maria of Montferrat succeeded as Queen of Jerusalem.

== Marriage and issue ==
On 15 August 1214 Philippa married as her husband Erard I of Ramerupt, a powerful noble from Champagne, France. The couple married clandestinely in defiance of Pope Innocent III's prohibition of their marriage, due to the couple having been related within the prohibited degree of kinship. Pope Innocent was prompted by the machinations of her aunt Blanche of Navarre, who had also seized Erard's fiefs. Shortly after their marriage, Erard encouraged Philippa to claim her father's county of Champagne which had succeeded to her cousin Theobald IV, who was still a minor. His mother Blanche of Navarre acted as his regent and she violently defended her son's rights which soon led to open warfare. (See main article: Champagne War of Succession). In early 1216, Erard and Philippa returned to France, where they took up a position at Nevers, but were besieged by the forces of Blanche of Navarre. Most of the Champagne barons rallied around Erard and Philippa, however, the French king, Philippe II, Emperor Frederick II, and the Duke of Burgundy intervened on behalf of Blanche and her son. Supporters of Blanche also convinced a papal legate that the divorce between Queen Isabella and her first husband, Humphrey IV of Toron had been invalid, thus making Philippa and her sister Alice illegitimate. However, the validity of the divorce was upheld, as there had been no impediment to Maria of Montferrat's accession to the throne in 1205. The war finally ended upon Theobald reaching his majority in 1222, and in April of that year, Philippa was persuaded to renounce her claim to Champagne on behalf of her cousin. Theobald was however, obliged to pay Erard, Philippa and Alice a large monetary compensation. In addition to the generous financial settlement, Erard and Philippa were exempted from all payment of outstanding debts, and excommunication. After this time, Philippa and Alice abandoned their claim on Champagne.

Together Erard and Philippa had:

- Henri of Venizy (d.1249), Seigneur of Ramerupt and Vénisy, married Marguerite de Salins by whom he had two sons.
- Erard II of Ramerupt (killed in battle, February 1250), married Mathilde by whom he had one daughter.
- Marie de Brienne (1215- c. 1251), married firstly Gaucher, Sire de Nanteuil-la Fosse, by whom she had three children; she married secondly Hughes II, Sire de Conflans, by whom she had one son.
- Marguerite de Brienne (died 1275), married Dirk Van Beveren, Burggraf of Dixmuiden, by whom she had issue. She became a nun after her husband's death.
- Heloise (Helvis) de Brienne, abbess of La Piété-Dieu-lès-Ramerupt
- Isabeau de Brienne (died 1274/1277), married firstly Henri V, Count of Grandpré, by whom she had three children; she married secondly Jean de Picquigny, by whom she had one daughter. Isabeau was the ancestress of Louis I, Count of Flanders.
- Jeanne de Brienne, Dame de Séans-en-Othe, married before 1250 Mathieu III, Sire de Montmorency, by whom she had five children.
- Sibylle de Brienne, Abbess of Ramerupt
- Alix de Brienne

Philippa died on 20 December 1250, a little more than six years after her husband. She was aged about fifty-three.

== Sources ==
- Evergates, Theodore (1993). Feudal society in medieval France: documents from the County of Champagne. University of Pennsylvania Press.
- Karras, Ruth Mazo; Kaye, Joel; Matter, E. Ann, eds. (2008). Law and the Illicit in Medieval Europe. University of Pennsylvania Press.
- Nielen, Marie-Adélaïde, ed. (2003). Lignages d'outremer: Introduction, notes et éditions critique. Paris: Académie des inscriptions et belles-lettres.
- Perry, Guy (2013). John of Brienne, King of Jerusalem, Emperor of Constantinople, c.1175-1237. Cambridge University Press.
- Perry, Guy (2018). The Briennes: The Rise and Fall of a Champenois Dynasty in the Age of the. Cambridge University Press.
