= Countess of Gloucester =

Countess of Gloucester is a title that may be held by a woman in her own right or as wife of the Earl of Gloucester.

Women who have held the title include:

== Countesses in their own right ==
- Isabella, 3rd Countess of Gloucester (d. 1217), whose title was held by her husband (King John) after 1189, and again by her in her own right from 1216 onward.

== Countesses by marriage ==
- Mabel FitzRobert, Countess of Gloucester (c.1100-1157)
- Isabel Marshal (1200-1240)
- Maud de Lacy, Countess of Hertford and Gloucester (1223-1289)
- Alice de Lusignan of Angoulême (c.1236-1290)
- Joan of Acre (1272-1307)
- Margaret de Clare (1293-1342)
- Constance of York, Countess of Gloucester (c.1375-1416)
