= Alice de Lusignan =

Alice de Lusignan may refer to:

- Alice de Lusignan, Countess of Surrey (1224-1256), daughter of Hugh X de Lusignan and Isabella of Angoulême
- Alice de Lusignan, Countess of Gloucester (after 1236–1290), daughter of Hugh XI of Lusignan
