= Walter III of Brienne =

12th-century French nobleman

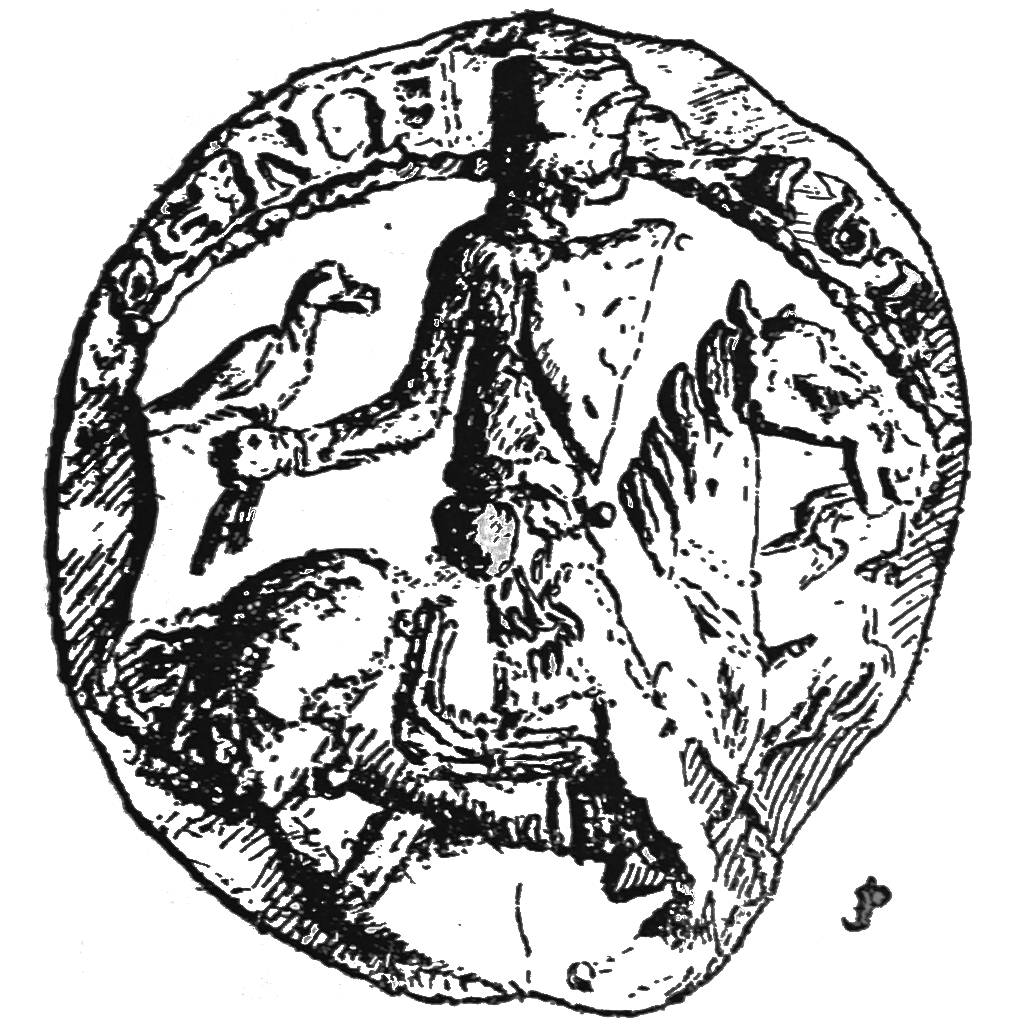
Seal of Walter III of Brienne

Walter III of Brienne (French: Gautier, Italian: Gualtiero; died June 1205) was a nobleman from northern France. Becoming count of Brienne in 1191, Walter married the Sicilian princess Elvira and took an army to southern Italy to claim her inheritance. He became prince of Taranto in her right in 1201 but died fighting before he could establish himself as king of Sicily.

== Early life ==
Walter III was the eldest son of Erard II of Brienne and Agnès of Montfaucon. He was likely born after 1166, and succeeded his father as count of Brienne in 1191. In the late 1190s, Walter and his brothers became involved in the conflict between Peter II of Courtenay (first cousin of King Philip II of France) and Peter's vassal Hervé IV of Donzy. Possibly provoked by Philip's support of his cousin, Walter briefly "abandoned the king of France" during the latter's conflict with King Richard I of England. Philip then became weary of the growing influence of the Brienne brothers.

== Marriage and campaign ==
At the end of the 12th century, Sibylla of Acerra, widow of King Tancred of Sicily, arrived with her daughters in France. Sibylla sought a capable nobleman who would marry her eldest daughter, Elvira (known by a handful of other names, including Albinia and Maria), and press her claim to the Kingdom of Sicily. Sicily was then controlled by the regents of the orphaned infant King Frederick, whose parents, Emperor Henry VI and Empress Constance, had deposed Sibylla's family. King Philip II of France, having been approached by the former Sicilian queen, convened a meeting in Melun. It was agreed there that Elvira should be married to Walter. Philip thereby emphasized his authority over Walter while at the same time encouraging him to leave France. Walter reportedly received an impressive sum of 20,000 livre parisis from the king, though this is doubtful. For the House of Brienne, however, Walter's marriage to Elvira signified a sudden rise and the beginning of the dynasty's golden age.

The Fourth Crusade was launched by Walter's immediate suzerain, Count Theobald III of Champagne, in November 1199. Walter promptly took the cross and started persuading prospective crusaders, such as his cousin Walter of Montbéliard, to assist him in his upcoming campaign in southern Italy on their way to the Holy Land. Besides recruiting men, Walter energetically collected money and supplies from 1200, selling or mortgaging all of his land by April 1201. He also secured the blessing and significant aid from Pope Innocent III. Innocent was the guardian of King Frederick but determinedly opposed to his regents. He refused Walter's petition to recognize Elvira's claim to Frederick's throne; instead, he recognized the couple's right to the Principality of Taranto and the County of Lecce. In return, Tancred's family was compelled to recognize Frederick as their king. Walter knew that securing possession of Taranto and Lecce would give him a sufficient power base and agreed.

Leaving his younger brother John in charge of Brienne, Walter arrived to the Italian Peninsula with a small army, including sixty knights and forty mounted sergeants. By the late spring of 1201, he had arrived to Frederick's realm and appeared victorious, having won battles at Capua and Cannae. Innocent urged Walter to cross to the island of Sicily. Walter was reluctant to combat Innocent's enemies on the island before consolidating his position on the peninsula.

== Death and aftermath ==
By 1204, Walter was besieged in the fortress of Terracina by Diepold of Vohburg and lost an eye to an arrow, but he broke the siege and put Diepold to fight. One night in June 1205, a contingent of enemy soldiers infiltrated Walter's camp, cut the ropes of his tent, felled it on Walter and stabbed him. Walter died of his wounds soon afterwards.

Elvira, pregnant at the time of Walter's death, quickly remarried. She gave birth to a posthumous son, Walter IV. Their family's claims posed problems for the rest of Frederick's reign. Walter III was succeeded in Brienne by his brother John, who held the county until Walter IV reached the age of majority.

== Sources ==
- Kennan, Elizabeth (1971). "Innocent III and the First Political Crusade: A Comment on the Limitations of Papal Power". Traditio. 27.
- McDougall, Sara (2016). Royal Bastards: The Birth of Illegitimacy, 800–1230. Oxford University Press.
- Mitchell, Roger Haydon (2011). Church, Gospel, and Empire: How the Politics of Sovereignty Impregnated the West. Wipf & Stock.
- Perry, Guy (2013). John of Brienne: King of Jerusalem, Emperor of Constantinople, c.1175–1237. Cambridge University Press.

Preceded by Robert	Prince of Taranto; 1200–1205	Succeeded by Frederick
Preceded by Erard II	Count of Brienne; 1191–1205	Succeeded by John as regent of Walter IV
