= Peter of Alençon =

Peter of Alençon may refer to:

- Peter I, Count of Alençon (1251–1284), son of King Louis IX of France
- Peter II, Count of Alençon (1330–1404)

== See also ==
- Pierre d'Alençon (active 1940s-1950s), French slalom canoeist
