= André of Brienne =

French nobleman

André de Brienne (c. 1135 – 4 October 1189), lord of Ramerupt, was a French nobleman who participated in the Third Crusade.

== Life ==
André was the fourth son of Walter II, count of Brienne and Adelaide of Baudement. He married Alix of Venizy in 1167, was knighted in 1168, and inherited his father's half of Ramerupt in 1176.

André arrived in the Holy Land on 28 August 1189 to participate in the Siege of Acre with the first French troops, which he led alongside James of Avesnes, Henry I of Barres and Philip of Dreux. On 4 October that year, Saladin launched a new attack against the crusader army besieging the town. The battle was quickly won by the crusaders, but when they had victory within their grasp the crusaders' camp descended into anarchy and began to flee. André of Brienne, in command of the rearguard, tried to stop the fleeing crusaders and send them back into battle, but he was thrown from his horse. Covered in injuries, his screams of despair did not move his companions, not even his brother Erard, as they fled, leaving him to die there. Seven thousand other crusaders were also killed in this battle, including Gerard of Ridefort, grandmaster of the Templars.

== Family, marriage and issue ==
Around 1167 he married Alix of Venizy. They had the following children:

- Gautier of Brienne (Note: Evergates states he died on crusade with his father.)
- Erard of Brienne (c. 1170–1245), lord of Ramerupt and of Vénisy.
- Elisabeth of Brienne who married Milon lord of Pougy.
- Agnès of Brienne, who around 1211 married Miles IV lord of Noyers.
- Ada of Brienne

== Sources ==
- Andrea, Alfred (2000). Contemporary Sources for the Fourth Crusade: Revised Edition. BRILL.
- Evergates, Theodore (2007). The Aristocracy in the County of Champagne, 1100-1300. University of Pennsylvania Press.
- Perry, Guy (2018). The Briennes: The Rise and Fall of a Champenois Dynasty in the Age of the. Cambridge University Press.
