= Erard of Brienne-Ramerupt =

French noble (died 1246)

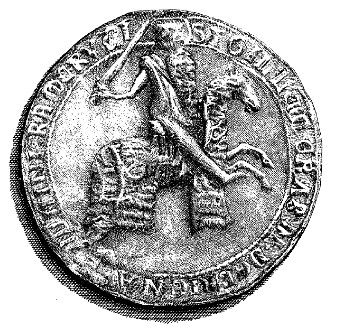

Arms : burelé d'azur et d'or, au lion d'or, brochant sur le tout · .

Érard de Brienne (c. 1170 † 1246) was a French nobleman. He was lord of Ramerupt and of Venizy, and also a pretender to the county of Champagne as an instigator of the Champagne War of Succession. He was a son of André of Brienne and of Alix of Vénizy.

== Early life ==
He was born in Ramerupt, Aube, Champagne, France. He was the son of André of Brienne and Alix of Venizy.

A social-climber from a minor branch of the Brienne family, Erard actually held no lands in Brienne and had little just cause to appropriate the name "of Brienne" for himself. His uncle Erard II of Brienne had indeed ruled as count of Brienne. Andre, the brother of Erard II, was the father of Erard of Brienne-Ramerupt. The younger Erard was actually lord of Ramerupt, which wasn't very impressive compared to the holdings of the more senior branches of the Brienne family. Within his own letters, the younger Erard thus tried to enhance his prestige by consistently referring to himself as "Erard of Brienne" and not even mentioning Ramerupt. The name "Erard of Brienne-Ramerupt" is retroactively applied by historians for the sake of clarity.

Erard of Brienne-Ramerupt's uncle, the aforementioned Count Erard II of Brienne, was the father of the famous crusader knight John of Brienne (1170–1237), who in 1210 wed the heiress Maria of Jerusalem to become the nominal King of Jerusalem by marriage (albeit, the crusaders had lost control of the city of Jerusalem itself by this point). Erard of Brienne-Ramerupt, perhaps seeking to emulate the success of his cousin, who found great prestige traveling to the east and marrying a powerful heiress, therefore in June 1213 left Champagne for the Latin East with the stated intention of marrying Philippa of Champagne, the younger half-sister of Maria of Jerusalem.

== The War of Succession of Champagne ==
The line of succession of the counts of Champagne had become complicated in the current generation. Before he left France to fight in the Third Crusade in 1190, Henry II had his barons swear that should he never return, his younger brother Theobald III was his designated heir. Henry II never returned from the Latin East, but instead married Queen Isabella I of Jerusalem and fathered two daughters, Alice and Philippa. Henry II died in 1197. Technically, Henry II's young daughters were his rightful heirs. However, their family made no attempt to press their claim, and Theobald III succeeded him. Theobald died of a sudden illness in May 1201, leaving behind his heavily pregnant wife, Blanche of Navarre, who secured the succession for a posthumous son, Theobald IV.

Having successfully married Philippa, Erard of Brienne-Ramerupt returned to Champagne with his new bride in January 1216. Armed clashes soon broke out, and the War of Succession of Champagne began.

King Philip II imposed a truce in April 1216 to put a stop to the fighting, and held a court at Melun in July 1216 to hear Erard and Philippa's case. Unfortunately for Erard, the court ruled that because Theobald III had already done homage for Champagne to the king for several years, yet Philippa and her family never challenged his succession in all that time, Henry II's daughters could no longer make a claim for the inheritance. Blanche again presented the signed agreements of Henry II's barons which swore that Theobald III was to be his heir if he never returned from the crusade. Unsatisfied, Erard returned to open rebellion in spring 1217. Erard gathered to himself a large number of barons from the fringes of Champagne or from old and powerful aristocratic families, who were not pleased with the increasing efforts of Theobald III and Blanche to bring them all under centralized control. Most of Erard and Philippa's supports came from the fringes of Champagne, along the southern and eastern borders, away from the core territories of "Champagne and Brie" in the west. One of Erard's major supporters was Simon of Joinville, hereditary seneschal of Champagne and leader of one of the most powerful noble families in the county. Further, Erard allied with Theobald I, Duke of Lorraine, significantly bolstering the rebel faction.

By 1218, however, the tide had turned, as Blanche secured papal excommunications against the rebel lords, and gained the support of the neighboring duke of Burgundy and count of Bar. Further, Blanche allied with Holy Roman Emperor Frederick II to counterbalance Duke Theobald I of Lorraine. By May 1218 Blanche and her army rode with Frederick II's forces to Lorraine's capital of Nancy and burned it to the ground. By June 1218, the rebellion had largely collapsed and individual lords began to make their own separate peaces. Erard and Philippa established a truce agreement in July 1218, which ultimately lasted the rest of Blanche's regency until 1222, during which time other rebel lords continued to haggle for better peace terms.

Blanche offered peace on generous terms to Erard and Philippa, wanting to end the challenge to her son's rule as quickly as possible. Erard received a surprisingly large payment of 4,000 livres, with a lifetime rent of 1,200 livres.

Only after the war ended, when hope of becoming count of Champagne was lost, did Erard stop the charade of presenting himself as "Erard of Brienne". Instead, after 1222, he would specify in his letters that he was "Erard of Brienne, lord of Ramerupt".

== Later life ==
Despite losing the war, on the whole Erard did quite well for himself. He had started out as a grasper from a minor branch of the Brienne family, clinging to a name he didn't technically have the right to use because it enhanced his social prestige. The massive payoff that Blanche gave Erard in the peace agreement that ended the war, however, propelled him to a place alongside the highest level of regional barons. Erard used his newfound wealth to buy up lands surrounding his own, so that he was able to cobble together his own larger barony. By 1227, he even bought up the other half-share of Ramerupt - he had only owned a half-share of his own castle up to this point - uniting it under his sole possession.

Erard did not intervene against Theobald IV during the difficult invasion of other northern barons of France in 1229, because anticipating that Erard might try to challenge him again, Theobald IV bought him off with a 200 livre fief, and in return had to swear to surrender his castles of Ramerupt and Venizy until the invasion was over.

Erard died at roughly the age of sixty in 1243. All that he had striven to achieve for himself and his children, however, evaporated within only a few years. Both of his sons died on the Seventh Crusade in 1250, and his wife Philippa died that same year. Erard had six daughters, one of whom had predeceased him without issue and another who became a nun. Ramerupt was subsequently divided into quarters between the remaining four daughters, whose husbands absorbed the lands into their own separate lordships.

== Marriage and issue ==
Erad married Philippa of Champagne, they had the following children:

- Erard (d. 1250 (Note: both sons died on Louis IX's crusade)), married Mathilde by whom he had one daughter.
- Henri (d. 1249 (Note: both sons died on Louis IX's crusade)), Seigneur of Ramerupt and de Vénisy, married Marguerite de Salins by whom he had two sons.
- Marie (1215- c.1251), married firstly Gaucher, Sire de Nanteuil-la Fosse, by whom she had three children; she married secondly Hughes II, Sire de Conflans, by whom she had one son.
- Marguerite (died 1275), married Thierry of Boeurs.
- Heloise (Helvis), abbess of La Piété-Dieu-lès-Ramerupt
- Isabeau (died 1274/1277), married firstly Henry V, Count of Grandpré, by whom she had three children; she married secondly Jean de Picquigny
- Jeanne, Dame de Séans-en-Othe, married before 1250 Mathieu III, Sire de Montmorency,
- Sibylle, Abbess of Ramerupt
- Alix

Philippa died on 20 December 1250, a little more than six years after her husband. She was aged about fifty-three.

== Sources ==
- Evergates, Theodore (2007). The Aristocracy in the County of Champagne, 1100-1300. University of Pennsylvania Press.
- Nielen, Marie-Adélaïde, ed. (2003). Lignages d'outremer: Introduction, notes et éditions critique. Paris: Académie des inscriptions et belles-lettres.
