= Joan, Countess of Blois =

French noble

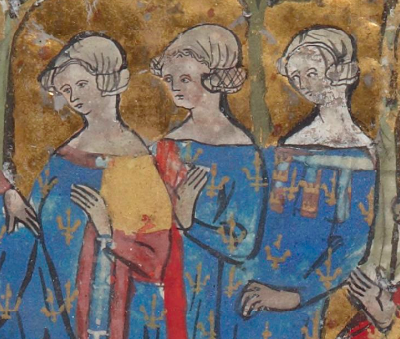
Jeanne de Châtillon, Béatrice de Bourbon & Blanche d'Artois

Joan of Châtillon (Jeanne de Blois; 1253? – 19 or 29 January 1291) was Countess of Blois from 1280 to 1291, and Lady of Avesnes.

She was the daughter of John I, Count of Blois and Alix of Brittany, Dame de Pontarcy.

Joan received the County of Chartres from her father during his life; she later sold these lands to Philip IV of France in 1286. She ceded the lordship of Avesnes to her cousin Hugh before her death. When she died in 1291 the other titles were left to him also.

In 1263, Joanne married Peter of Alençon, a son of King Louis IX of France and Margaret of Provence. They had:

- Louis (1272–1273).
- Philip (1274–1275).

Joan died in 1291, with no living issue. She left the title of Count of Blois and her remaining titles to her cousin Hugh.

== Sources ==
- Evergates, Theodore (2007). The Aristocracy in the County of Champagne, 1100-1300. University of Pennsylvania Press. ISBN 978-0-8122-4019-1.
- Morrison, Elizabeth; Hedeman, Anne D. (2010). Imagining the Past in France: History in Manuscript Painting, 1250-1500. J. Paul Getty Museum. ISBN 9781606060285.

Joan, Countess of Blois House of Blois
Preceded by John I	Countess of Blois; 1280–1291	Succeeded by Hugh II
Preceded by John I	Countess of Chartres bef. 1278–1291	Sold to royal domain
