= Theobald I of Lorraine =

Duke of Lorraine from 1213 to 1220

Theobald I
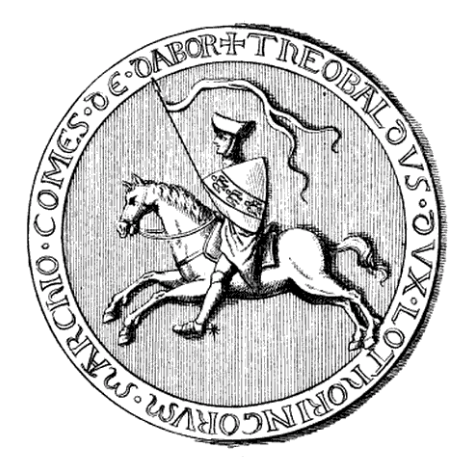
- + THEOBALDUS DUX LOTHORINGORUM MARCHIO COMES DE BABOR

Duke of Lorraine
- Reign: 1213 - 1220
- Predecessor: Frederick II
- Successor: Matthias II
- Born: c. 1191
- Died: 17 February 1220
- Spouse: Gertrude of Dagsburg
- House: House of Lorraine
- Father: Frederick II, Duke of Lorraine
- Mother: Agnes of Bar

Theobald I (French: Thiébaud or Thiébaut) (c. 1191 – 17 February 1220) was the duke of Lorraine from 1213 to his death. He was the son and successor of Frederick II and Agnes of Bar.

== Battle of Bouvines ==
Theobald joined Otto IV, Holy Roman Emperor, on 4 July 1214 at the Battle of Bouvines, where he was taken in prisoner in the rout. He was quickly liberated.

== Vassals ==
As duke of Lorraine, Theobald was a powerful lord, almost under the Holy Roman Empire and almost ruling independently. He had several important vassals but many of them strove for independence quite successfully. These vassals included the Bishops of Metz, the Bishops of Toul, the Bishops of Verdun, the County of Bar (though these counts were not de facto part of Lorraine at this point), the lord of Commercy, the Count of Vaudémont, and the Counts of Chiny (also lords of Montmédy). However the dukes suzerainty over these lordships was probably not much more than nominal.

== Other affairs ==
He was suggested by the abbot Gervase to be one of the leaders for the Fifth Crusade but he was already embroiled in the Champagne war of succession and had to decline.

== Champagne war of Succession ==
In 1216, in the Champagne War of Succession, he supported Erard I, Count of Brienne, in his quarrel with Theobald IV, Count of Champagne, who was supported by Philip II of France, Frederick II, Holy Roman Emperor, and Henry II of Bar. Frederick, the suzerain of Lorraine, considered it a felony to support a candidate he opposed and occupied the city of Rosheim, which he had given to Frederick II of Lorraine. Theobald responded in 1218, retaking Rosheim and ravaging Alsace. Frederick did not hesitate to counterattack and invaded Lorraine and took and burned Nancy, its capital. He then besieged and took the castle of Amance, where Theobald was taking refuge. He was imprisoned and constrained to recognize the suzerainty of the count of Champagne, the legitimacy of Erard of Brienne's claim to Champagne, and relinquish several lordships to attain liberty again. He never recovered his lost land and prestige and died in 1220.

== Kinslayer ==
Between 3 and 10 April 1217 (during the Champagne war of Succession) he searched for his problematic paternal uncle the bishop of Toul Matthew de Lorraine, found him on the path Void Parupt in Saint-Michel-sur-Meurthe, and killed him with a spear (implying a fight rather than a murder). The weapon he used to kill the unruly bishop was apparently borrowed from Simon of Joinville, who was an ally during the Champagne war of Succession and probably also a friend.

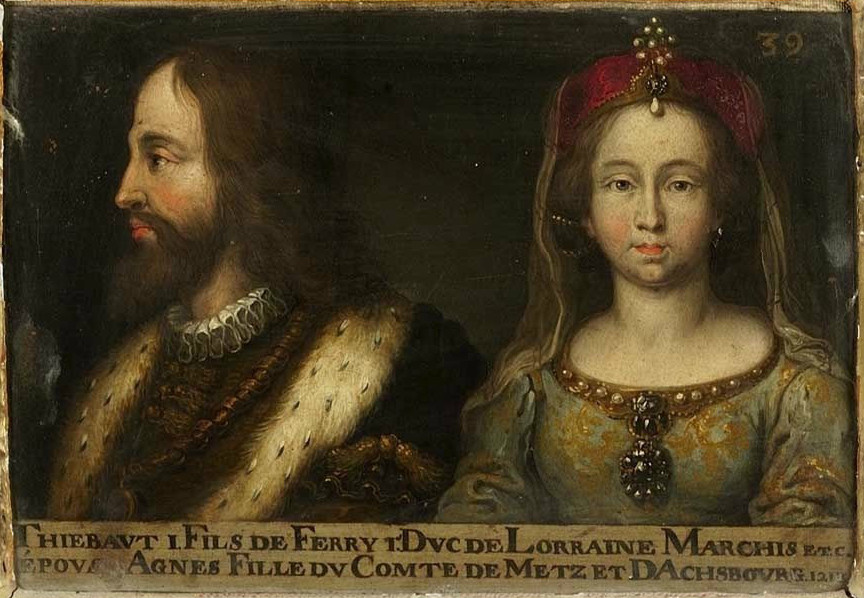
17th century depiction of Theobald and his wife, who was never more than 16 in his lifetime

== Lands and possible Hospitallier Association ==
As duke of Lorraine, his chief seat was at the city of Nancy. In 1212, through his wife Gertrude, he inherited the County of Dagsburg and its capital, the Chateau de Dabo and also Dorlisheim. Considering his ancestors' association with the Knights Hospitallier, it seems likely that the hospital was founded by him. Through a grant by the Emperor he also had Rosheim, but when he interfered in the War of the Succession of Champagne, it was taken away from him.

He also held the castles of Amance, Lunéville, Château des Ducs de Lorraine, and many more.

== Character/Personality ==
In accounts, the dukes of Lorraine are always referred to as extremely handsome and talented and, based on Theobald's military adventures, it is not unlikely that he was brave. Despite this, he seems to have been either stubborn or loyal, after refusing to back down when his liege joined the opposing side of the Champagne War of Succession. Opposing his Liege cost him dearly and his violent reactions against his liege show that he was too proud to seek to smooth things over. The killing of his uncle Matthew, Bishop of Toul, does not reflect well on his personality, especially when such actions were considered particularly egregious in the Middle Ages.

== Marriage and Succession ==
He had married, in 1206, Gertrude, only child and heir of Albert II, count of Dagsburg and Metz. They had no children, and she was just 16 years old when her husband died. His successor was Matthias his brother; his widow remarried his old rival, Theobald of Champagne.

== See also ==
- Dukes of Lorraine family tree

== Sources ==
- Buchheit, Nicolas (2016). "A Georgraphy of Power: The Hospitallers in the Territorial Policies of the Bishops of Strasbourg in Lower Alsace in the Thirteenth Century". In Edbury, Peter (ed.). The Military Orders Volume V: Politics and Power. Routledge.

Preceded by Frederick II	Duke of Lorraine; 1213–1220	Succeeded by Matthias II
