= Peter I of Alençon =

French prince

Peter I
- Count of Alençon
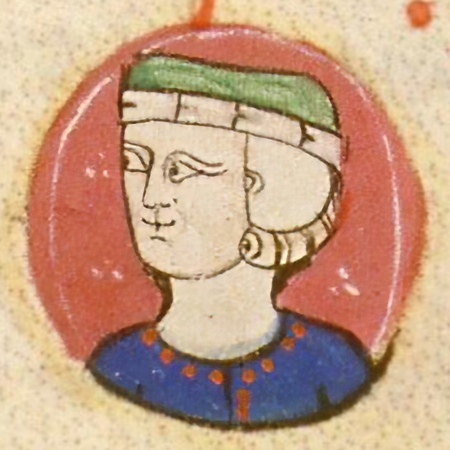
- Born: c. 1251; Atlit, Kingdom of Jerusalem
- Died: 6 April 1284; Reggio Calabria
- Spouse: Joan, Countess of Blois (m. 1272)
- Father: Louis IX of France
- Mother: Margaret of Provence

Peter I of Alençon (c. 1251 – 6 April 1284) was the son of Louis IX of France and Margaret of Provence.

He became Count of Alençon in 1269 and in 1284, Count of Blois and Chartres, and Seigneur de Guise in 1272 and 1284. He was also Count of Perche.

== Life ==
Peter was born at Atlit, Kingdom of Jerusalem, while his father led the Seventh Crusade. Back in France, he lived in Paris until 1269 when his father gave him in appanage the County of Alençon. He accompanied his father to Tunis during Eighth Crusade (1270), but this expedition was a fiasco, because of the dysentery epidemic that decimated the army of crusaders. His father and his brother Jean Tristan succumbed to the disease.

Following the death of his father in 1270, Louis IX, Peter's brother Philip became king of France. One of Philip III's first acts was to name Peter as regent in the event of his death. Around that time, the chaplain Andrew of Hungary became attached to Peter's court. He wrote a history of the Charles of Anjou's conquest of Sicily and dedicated it to Peter.

In December 1282, during the Sicilian Vespers, Peter marched his army to Naples to assist his uncle Charles I of Sicily, stopping at Reggio Calabria. By January 1283, he was at Catona, a suburb of Reggio, when he was attacked by Aragonese mercenaries and killed. His body was taken to Paris, where he was buried, with his heart interred at the now-demolished church of the Couvent des Jacobins. After his death without surviving sons, his portion of Alençon returned to the Crown. His widow did not remarry and sold Chartres in 1286 to King Philip IV the Fair. On her death Guise and Blois passed to her cousin Hugh of the House of Châtillon.

== Marriage ==
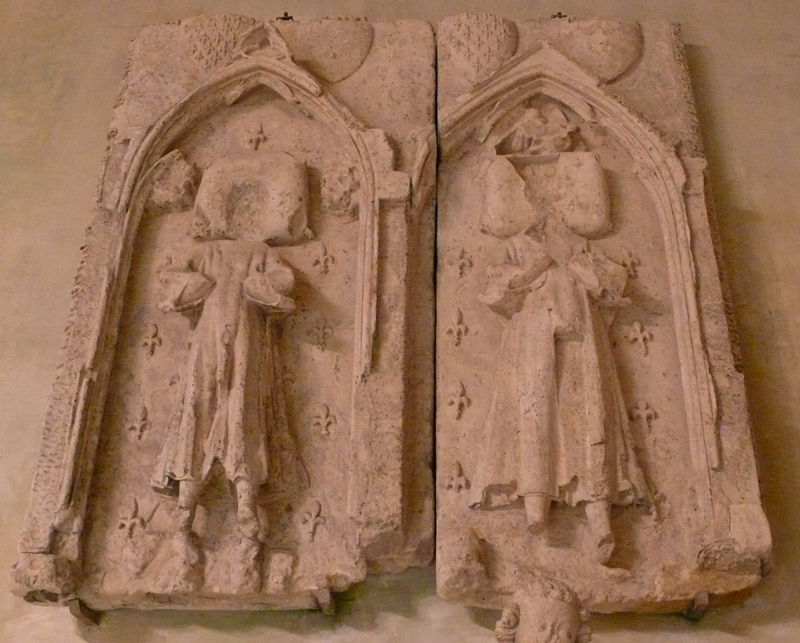
Tombs of Peter's sons

Peter married in 1272 to Joan of Châtillon, which brought him the lands Blois, Chartres and Guise. They had two sons, namely:

- Louis (1276–1277)
- Philip (1278–1279)

== Sources ==
- Baldwin, Philip B. (2014). Pope Gregory X and the Crusades. The Boydell Press.
- Bande, Alexandre (2009). Le coeur du roi: les Capétiens et les sépultures multiples, XIIIe-XVe siècles (in French). Tallandier.
- Berman, Constance H. (2018). The White Nuns: Cistercian Abbeys for Women in Medieval France. University of Pennsylvania Press.
- Burgtorf, Jochen (2008). The Central Convent of Hospitallers and Templars: History, Organization, and Personnel (1099/1120-1310). Brill.
- Runciman, Steven (2000). The Sicilian Vespers: A History of the Mediterranean World in the Later Thirteenth-Century (5th ed.). Cambridge University Press.
- Strayer, Joseph R. (1980). The Reign of Philip the Fair. Princeton University Press.
- Szűcs, Jenő (1999). "Theoretical Elements in Master Simon of Kéza's Gesta Hungarorum (1282–1285)". In László Veszprémy; Frank Schaer (eds.). Simon of Kéza: Deeds of the Hungarians. Central European University Press. pp. xxix–cii.
- Wood, Charles T. (1966). The French Apanages and the Capetian Monarchy, 1224-1328. Harvard University Press.

Vacant Crown land Title last held by Robert I	Count of Alençon; 1269-1284	Vacant Crown land Title next held by Charles I
Preceded by John I	Count of Blois and Chartres; 1280-1284 with Joan	Succeeded by Joan as sole ruler
