= Erard II, Count of Brienne =

French general and count of Brienne

Érard II of Brienne (died 1191) was count of Brienne from 1161 to 1191, and a French general during the Third Crusade, most notably at the Siege of Acre. He was the son of Gautier II, count of Brienne (Gautier II de Brienne), and Humbeline Baudemont, daughter of Andrew, lord of Baudemont (André de Baudement) and Agnès of Braine. His paternal grandparents were Érard I, Count of Brienne and Alix de Roucy. During this siege, he saw his brother André of Brienne die on 4 October 1189, before being killed himself on 8 February 1191. Érard II's nephew was Érard of Brienne-Ramerupt.

Before 1166, he married Agnès of Montfaucon (Agnès de Montfaucon) († after 1186), daughter of Amadeus II of Montfaucon and of Béatrice of Grandson-Joinville. Their children were:

- Walter III of Brienne (died 1205) count of Brienne and claimant to the throne of Sicily.
- William of Brienne (Guillaume de Brienne)(died 1199) lord of Pacy-sur-Armançon, married Eustachie of Courtenay, daughter of Peter I of Courtenay and Elisabeth of Courtenay.
- John of Brienne (1170–1237), king of Jerusalem (1210–1225), then emperor of Constantinople (1231–1237).
- Andrew
- Ida of Brienne, who married Ernoul of Reynel lord of Pierrefitte.
- Ide of Brienne, who married Anseau III de Traînel.

== Sources ==
- Nicholson, Robert Lawrence (1973). Joscelyn III and the Fall of the Crusader States: 1134-1199. Brill.
- Perry, Guy (2013). John of Brienne: King of Jerusalem, Emperor of Constantinople, c.1175-1237. Cambridge University Press.
- Schenk, Jochen (2012). Templar Families: Landowning Families and the Order of the Temple in France, c.1120-1307. Cambridge University Press.

French nobility
| Preceded by Walter II | Count of Brienne; 1161–1191 | Succeeded by Walter III |
