= John I of Brittany =

Duke of Brittany from 1221 to 1286

John I
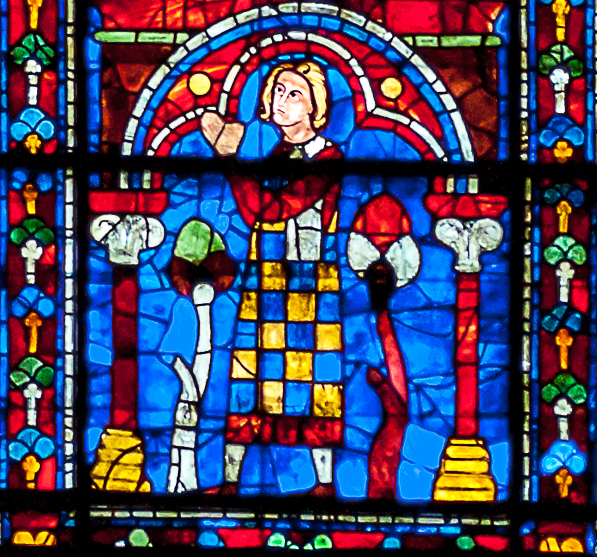
- John represented on a window in Chartres Cathedral

Duke of Brittany
- Reign: 21 October 1221 – 8 October 1286
- Predecessor: Peter I and Alix
- Successor: John II
- Regent: Peter I (1221–1237)

Earl of Richmond
- Reign: 1268
- Predecessor: Peter of Savoy
- Successor: John II
- Born: c. 1217/1218
- Died: 8 October 1286; Château de l'Isle
- Burial: Prières Abbey
- Spouse: Blanche of Navarre
- Issue Among others: John II, Duke of Brittany; Alix, Countess of Blois
- House: Dreux
- Father: Peter of Dreux
- Mother: Alix, Duchess of Brittany

John I (Breton: Yann, French: Jean; c. 1217/1218 – 8 October 1286), known as John the Red (Jean le Roux) due to the colour of his beard, was Duke of Brittany from 1221 to his death and 2nd Earl of Richmond in 1268.

John is usually identified with the Quens de Bretaigne (Count of Brittany) to whom are attributed six trouvère songs.

== Life ==
John was the eldest of three children born to Duchess Alix and her husband and co-ruler, Duke Peter I. He became duke upon his mother's death in 1221. His father, who had reigned as duke due to his marriage to Alix, ruled as regent until John reached adulthood. In 1268, Henry III granted the earldom of Richmond to John, and the title continued in his family, through frequent temporary forfeitures and reversions, until 1342.

He experienced a number of conflicts with the Bishop of Nantes and the Breton clergy. In 1240, he issued an edict expelling Jews from the duchy and cancelling all debts to them. He joined Louis IX of France in the Eighth Crusade in 1270, and survived the plague that killed the king. The duchy of Brittany experienced a century of peace, beginning with John I and ending with Duke John III's reign in 1341.

== Marriage and issue ==
In 1236 John married Infanta Blanche, daughter of King Theobald I of Navarre. They had the following surviving issue:

- John II, Duke of Brittany (1239–1305), married Beatrice of England and had issue.
- Peter (1241–1268), Lord of Dinan, Hade, Léon, Hennebont and La Roche-Derrien.
- Alix (1243–1288), Dame de Pontarcy; married John of Châtillon, Count of Blois.
- Theobald (1245–1246), interred in the church abbey of Saint-Gildas-de-Rhuys.
- Theobald (1247 – died young), interred in the church abbey of Saint-Gildas-de-Rhuys.
- Eleanor (1248 – died young), interred in the church abbey of Saint-Gildas-de-Rhuys.
- Nicolas (1249–1251), interred in the church abbey of Saint-Gildas-de-Rhuys.
- Robert (1251–1259), interred in the church abbey of Saint-Gildas-de-Rhuys.

== Sources ==
- Crawford, Anne (2002). Letters of Medieval Women. Sutton.
- Hallam, Elizabeth M.; Everard, Judith (2001). Capetian France, 987-1328. London: Longman. ISBN 9780582489097. OCLC 6813908.
- Jones, Michael (1988). The Creation of Brittany: A Late Medieval State. London: The Hambledon Press. ISBN 9780907628804. OCLC 16805427.
- Lower, Michael (2005). The Barons' Crusade: A Call to Arms and Its Consequences. University of Pennsylvania Press.
- Morvan, Frederic (2009). La Chevalerie bretonne et la formation de l'armee ducale (in French). Presses Universitaires de Rennes.
- Richard, Jean (1983). Lloyd, Simon (ed.). Saint Louis, Crusader King of France. Translated by Birrell, Jean. Cambridge University Press.

== See also ==
- Dukes of Brittany family tree

John I of Brittany House of Dreux Cadet branch of the Capetian dynasty Born: c. 1217/18 Died: 8 October 1286
Regnal titles
Preceded by Alix and Peter I	Duke of Brittany; 1221–1286	Succeeded by John II
Peerage of England
Preceded by Peter of Savoy	Earl of Richmond; 1268	Succeeded by John II
