= Hugh II of Blois =

Hugh II
- Count of Blois
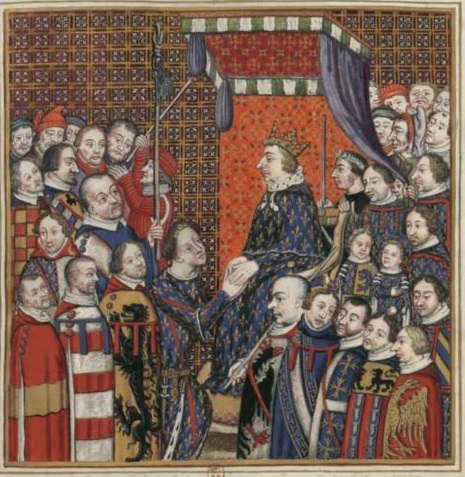
- Second from right.
- Born: 1258
- Died: 1307 (aged 48–49)
- Noble family: Châtillon
- Spouse: Beatrix of Dampierre (m. c. 1287)
- Issue: Guy I of Blois-Châtillon; John, Lord of Château-Renault
- Father: Guy III, Count of Saint-Pol
- Mother: Matilda of Brabant

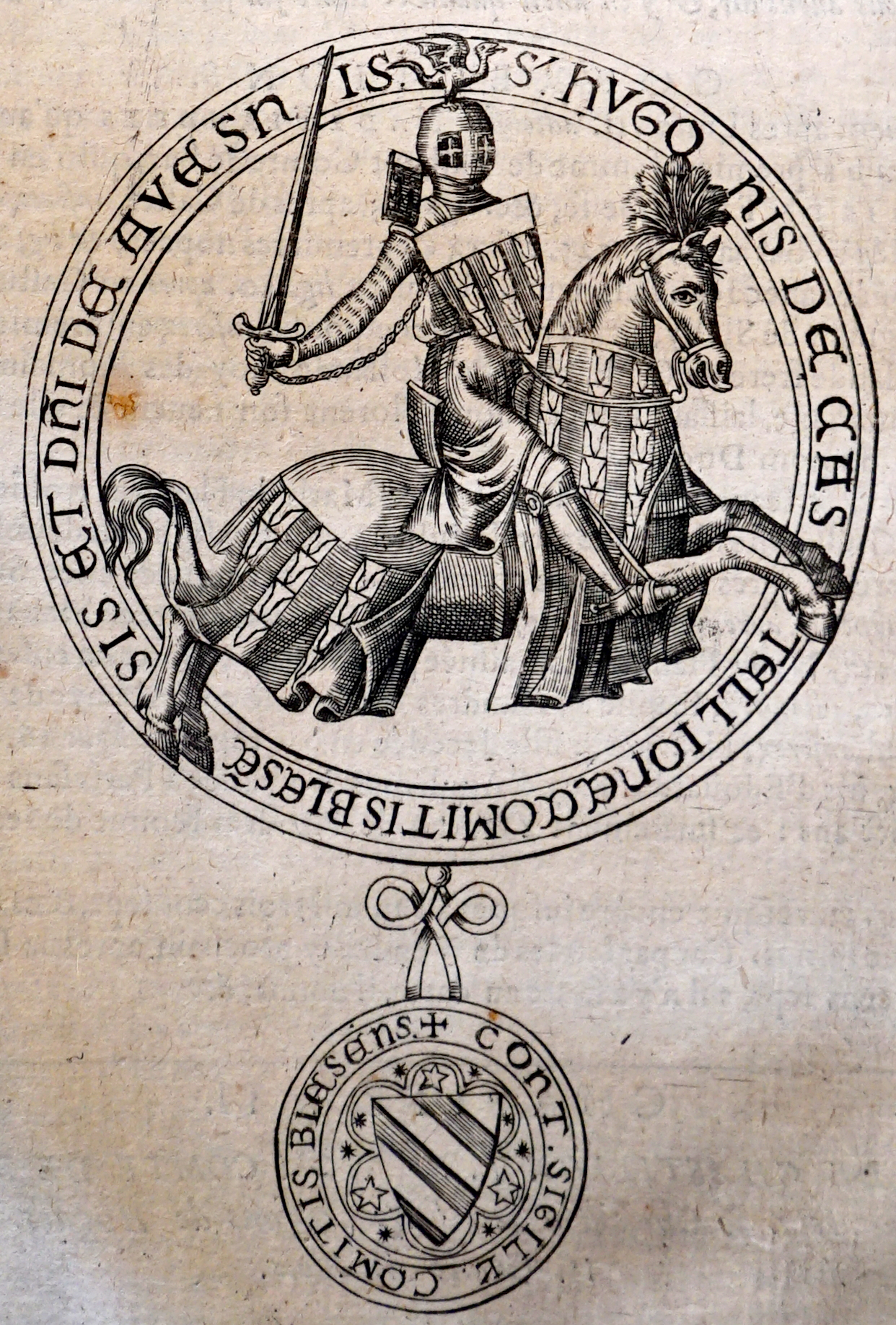
Seal (sugullum) of Hugh II of Chatillion, count of Blois and lord of Avesn: S[IGILLUM] HUGONIS DE CASTELLIONE COMITIS BLESENSIS ET D[OMI]NI DE AVESNIS

Hugh II of Châtillon (1258 - 1307), son of Guy III, Count of Saint-Pol, and Matilda of Brabant, was count of St Pol 1289–1292 and Count of Blois 1292–1307.

He married c. 1287 Beatrix of Dampierre, daughter of Guy of Flanders and Isabelle of Luxembourg. They had two children:

- Guy I of Blois-Châtillon (d. 1342)
- John of Châtillon (d. 1329), Lord of Château-Renault

== Sources ==
- Fegley, Randall (2002). The Golden Spurs of Kortrijk: How the Knights of France Fell to the Foot Soldiers of Flanders in 1302. McFarland & Co.
- Pollock, M.A. (2015). Scotland, England and France after the Loss of Normandy, 1204-1296. The Boydell Press.

Preceded by Guy III	Count of Saint Pol; 1289–1292	Succeeded by Guy IV
Preceded by Joanne	Count of Blois; 1292–1307	Succeeded by Guy I
