= Pont-Arcy =

- Commune
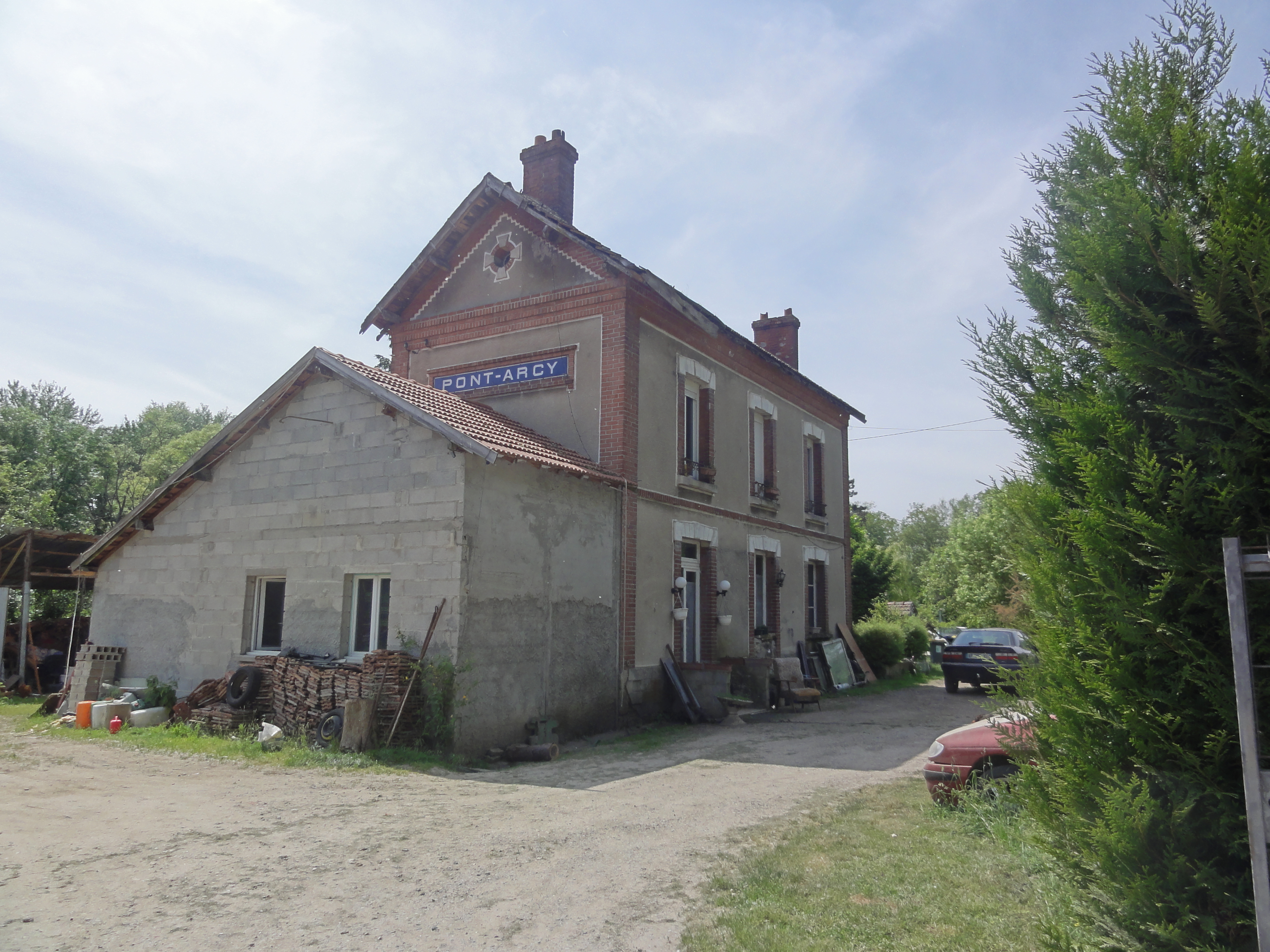
- Former train station
- Location of Pont-Arcy
- Location within France Location within Hauts-de-France
- Coordinates: 49°23′44″N 3°37′51″E
- Country: France
- Region: Hauts-de-France
- Department: Aisne
- Arrondissement: Soissons
- Canton: Fère-en-Tardenois
- Intercommunality: Val de l'Aisne

Government
  - Mayor (2026–32): Christian Laplace
- Area^{1}: 3.18 km^{2} (1.23 sq mi)
- Highest elevation: 150 m (490 ft)
- Lowest elevation: 42 m (138 ft)
- Population (2023): 115
  - Density: 36.2/km^{2} (93.7/sq mi)
- Time zone: UTC+01:00 (CET)
  - Summer (DST): UTC+02:00 (CEST)
- INSEE/Postal code: 02612 /02160
- ^{1} French Land Register data, which excludes lakes, ponds, glaciers > 1 km^{2} (0.386 sq mi or 247 acres) and river estuaries.

Pont-Arcy (French pronunciation: [pɔ̃.t‿aʁsi]) is a commune in the Aisne department in Hauts-de-France in northern France.

== Population ==
Historical population
Year	Pop.	±% p.a.
1968	123	—
1975	100	−2.91%
1982	113	+1.76%
1990	110	−0.34%
1999	109	−0.10%
2007	130	+2.23%
2012	129	−0.15%
2017	127	−0.31%
2023	115	−1.64%
Source: INSEE

== See also ==
- Communes of the Aisne department
- List of medieval bridges in France
