= Alice de Lusignan, Countess of Gloucester =

Half-sister of King Henry III of England

Alice de Lusignan
- Countess of Hertford; Countess of Gloucester
- Born: after October 1236; Angoulême, Poitou, France
- Died: May 1290
- Noble family: Lusignan
- Spouses: Gilbert de Clare, 7th Earl of Gloucester, 6th Earl of Hertford
- Issue: Isabel de Clare; Joan de Clare
- Father: Hugh XI of Lusignan, Count of La Marche and of Angoulême
- Mother: Yolande de Dreux, Countess of Penthièvre and of Porhoet

Alice de Lusignan (or Alice of Angoulême) (born after October 1236 – May 1290) was an English noblewoman, the first wife of Marcher baron Gilbert de Clare, 7th Earl of Gloucester, and half-niece of King Henry III of England.

It was rumoured that she became the mistress of her half first cousin Prince Edward, while she was briefly imprisoned on account of her husband's treason.

== Family ==
Alice de Lusigan was born sometime after October 1236 in Angoulême, Charente, France, the daughter of Hugh XI of Lusignan, Seigneur de Lusignan, Couhe, et de Peyrat, Count of La Marche and Angoulême, and Yolande of Brittany, and sister of Hugh XII of Lusignan. By her paternal grandmother, Isabella of Angoulême, Queen-Consort of King John of England, she was niece, in the half blood, of Henry III.

== Marriage ==
Alice arrived in England on an unrecorded date. On 6 April 1250, her father was killed in battle at Fariskur, Egypt. In 1253, Alice married Gilbert de Clare, 7th Earl of Gloucester (2 September 1243 – 7 December 1295). He was the son of Richard de Clare, 6th Earl of Hertford and Maud de Lacy. He was ten years old at the time of his marriage. In later years, "Red" Gilbert would become one of the most powerful and important noblemen in the kingdom. The marriage produced two daughters.

=== Issue ===
- Isabel de Clare (10 March 1263 – 1333), married firstly Guy de Beauchamp, 10th Earl of Warwick, and secondly Maurice de Berkeley, 2nd Baron Berkeley. She died childless.
- Joan de Clare (1264- after 1302), married firstly Duncan Macduff, 7th Earl of Fife by whom she had issue, and secondly Gervase Avenel.

== Prince Edward ==
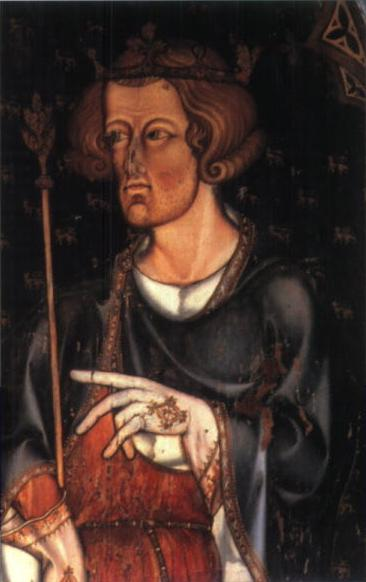
King Edward I of England, alleged lover of Alice of Lusignan

Alice was described as being very beautiful with dark hair and dark eyes. She was also flirtatious and provocative. She was said to strongly resemble her grandmother Queen Isabella. In the late summer of 1259, she formed a friendship with her half first cousin, Prince Edward, who would later ascend the throne as King Edward I. When civil war broke out and the barons rose up against the King led by Simon de Montfort, Alice's husband supported them. Prince Edward, who headed the Royalist Army, quickly went to war against the traitors who had betrayed his father. Tonbridge Castle, one of Gloucester's properties was captured by Prince Edward's troops and Alice, who was resident in the castle at the time, taken prisoner. It is alleged that the Prince and his cousin became lovers while she was imprisoned. Edward's young wife, Eleanor of Castile was in France at the time. Alice was released shortly afterward.

At the Battle of Lewes on 14 May 1264 King Henry's forces were defeated by those led by Simon and Gloucester who commanded the second line of battle. After the victory, Gilbert and his brother Thomas were both knighted. Simon de Montfort became the de facto ruler of England. On 20 October the Earl of Gloucester was excommunicated. A month later, he fell out with Montfort and transferred his allegiance to Prince Edward. Later after the Battle of Evesham, in which Simon de Montfort was killed, Gloucester was richly rewarded for his support of Prince Edward and was granted the castle and title of Abergavenny and the castle of Brecknock. He became the most powerful lord in the Welsh Marches. In 1267, he and Alice began to live apart; on 18 July 1271 they formally separated, and the marriage was annulled on 16 May 1285. Gloucester married secondly, on 30 April 1290, Joan of Acre, daughter of Prince Edward who had acceded in 1272 as King Edward I of England. Alice died in May 1290. Through her daughter Joan, Alice was the grandmother of Isabella MacDuff, Countess of Buchan, who placed the crown of Scotland upon the head of Robert the Bruce at Scone.
