= Gertrude of Dagsburg =

German noblewoman and trouvère

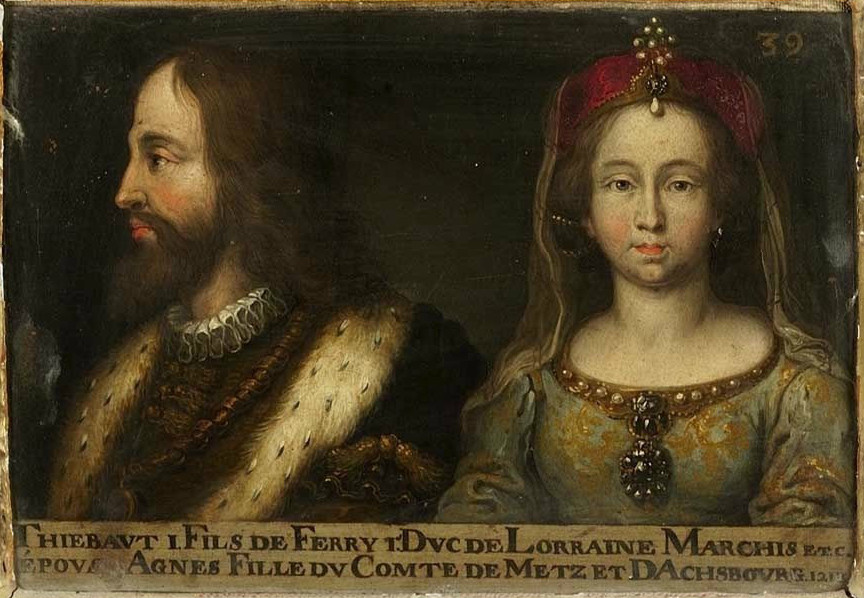
Theobald and Gertrude in a 17th-century painting

Gertrude of Dagsburg (died 30 March 1225) was the reigning countess of Metz and Dagsburg (Dabo) between 1212 and 1225. She was duchess consort of Lorraine by her short-lived marriage to Theobald. She was also a trouvère composing poems set to music, which often revolved around tales of courtly love.

Her mother was Gertrude of Baden, and her father was of Albert II, count of Metz and Dagsburg (Dabo); she was his heiress.

== Life ==
Gertrude was named after her mother, Gertrude of Baden, the daughter of Herman III, Margrave of Baden. The birth date of May 1205 (or as late as mid-1206) often assigned to her is questionable, as her mother was then 52 years old. A more plausible date is c. 1190.

Gertrude succeeded her father as countess on his death in 1212, by which time she had already married Theobald, soon to be Duke of Lorraine (1213), according to the Vitæ Odiliæ. Their betrothal occurred in September 1205, possibly when she was an infant. On her marriage her husband took over the administration of her inheritance, but he died in early 1220 without siring any children, leaving her a widow.

In May 1220 she married Theobald IV of Champagne, who was only an adolescent, against the wishes of the Emperor Frederick II. In 1222 Theobald repudiated her for either consanguinity (following Alberic of Trois-Fontaines) or sterility (according to Richer of Senones). In 1224 she married a third time to Simon III, count of Leiningen, but she died within a year. She was buried in the abbey of Sturzelbronn. Her husband inherited her county.

== Works ==
Gertrude is probably the Duchess of Lorraine who composed two lyric poems in Old French. One, Un petit devant le jour, is found in multiple sources, some with accompanying musical notation. The other is found only in manuscript CH-BEsu MS 389, alongside Un petit devant. They are numbered R1640 and R1995.
