= Agnes of Beaujeu =

- Died: 1231
- Spouse: Theobald I of Navarre
- Issue: Blanche of Navarre, Duchess of Brittany
- Father: Guichard IV of Beaujeu
- Mother: Sybille of Flanders

Agnes of Beaujeu (Agnès de Beaujeu; ? – 11 July 1231) was a French noblewoman, the daughter of Guichard IV of Beaujeu and Sybil of Hainaut. She was Countess of Champagne by her marriage to Theobald I of Navarre.

== Marriage and death ==
Agnes married in 1223 to Theobald. For Theobald, this was his second marriage. They had a daughter, Blanche of Navarre, Duchess of Brittany.

Agnes died in 1231, and was buried at Clairvaux.
