= Blanche of Navarre, Duchess of Brittany =

Duchess of Brittany from 1236 to 1283

Blanche of Navarre
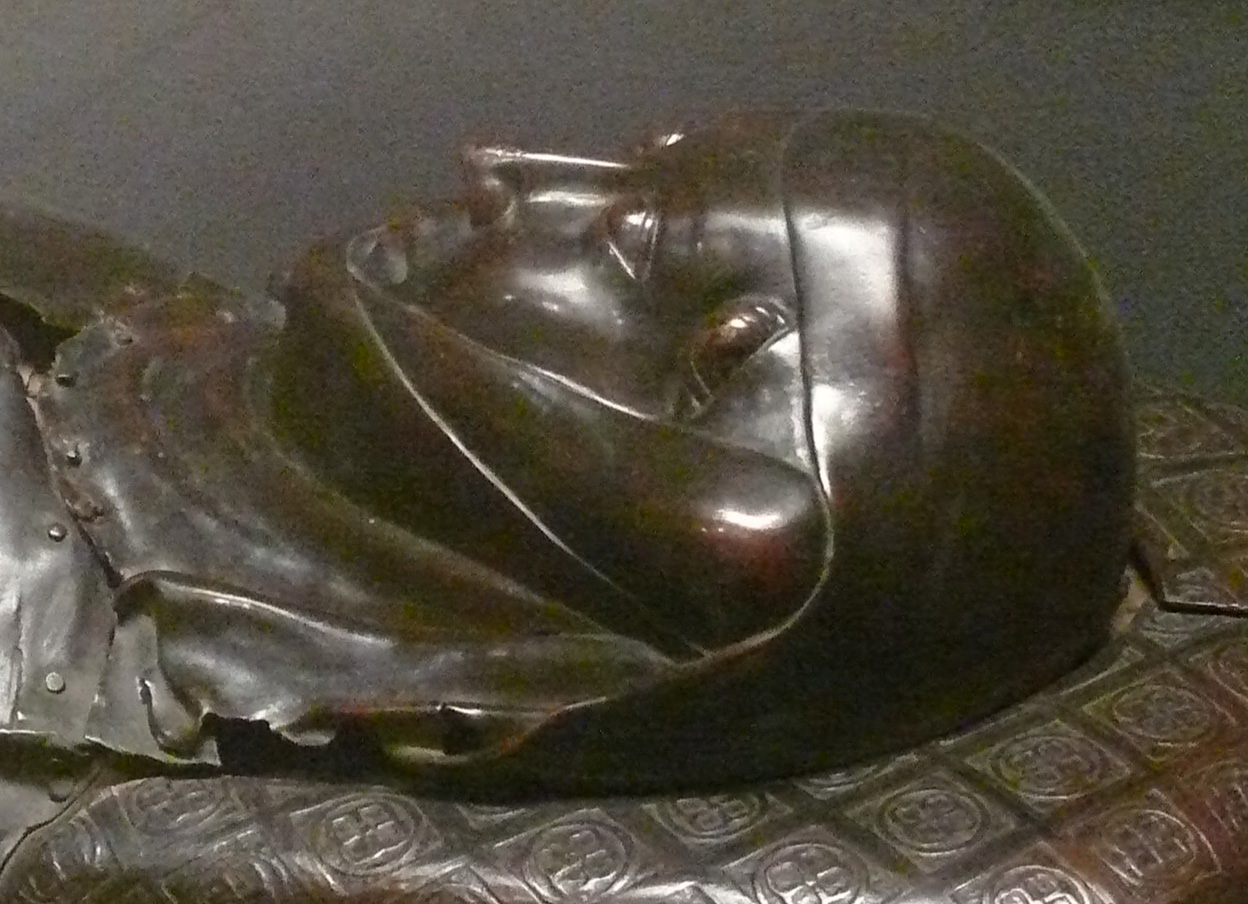
- Tomb effigy

Duchess consort of Brittany
- Tenure: 1236–1283
- Born: 1226
- Died: 12 August 1283 (aged 56–57); Naples
- Burial: Abbey de la Joie, Hennebont
- Spouse: John I, Duke of Brittany
- Issue Among others: John II, Duke of Brittany; Peter, Lord of Hade; Alix, Countess of Châtillon
- House: House of Blois; House of Blois-Champagne; House of Blois-Navarre
- Father: Theobald I of Navarre
- Mother: Agnes of Beaujeu

Blanche of Navarre (1226 – 12 August 1283), also known as Blanche of Champagne, was the daughter of Theobald the Troubador, King of Navarre and Count of Champagne, and Agnes of Beaujeu. She was a member of the House of Champagne. By her marriage to John I, Duke of Brittany, she became Duchess consort of Brittany.

== Life ==
Blanche was firstly betrothed to Otto III, Count of Burgundy; the marriage contract was signed on 16 January 1236. However, the engagement was broken.

Blanche was instead married in 1236 to John I, Duke of Brittany: the main reason he married Blanche was so he could get Navarre, and Theobald did make John heir to the throne. However, John renounced the claim after Margaret of Bourbon bore Theobald two sons.

== Marriage and children ==
Blanche and John had:

- John II, Duke of Brittany
- Peter of Brittany (2 April 1241–Paris, 19 October 1268), Lord of Hade
- Alix of Brittany, Dame de Pontarcy
- Theobald (1245–1256), died young
- Theobald (died soon after birth)
- Eleanor (1248), died young
- Nicholas (1249–1261), died young
- Robert (1251–1259), died young

Of their eight children, only their eldest three lived to adulthood.

In 1270 Blanche founded the Abbey de la Joie near Hennebont; she was later buried there. She died in 1283; her husband outlived her by three years. Blanche outlived six of her eight children.

== Sources ==
- Evergates, Theodore (2007). The Aristocracy in the County of Champagne, 1100-1300. University of Pennsylvania Press.
- Morvan, Frederic (2009). La Chevalerie bretonne et la formation de l'armee ducale (in French). Presses Universitaires de Rennes.
- O'Neill, John P., ed. (1996). Enamels of Limoges: 1100-1350. Metropolitan Museum of Art.
- Pippenger, Randall Todd, ed. (2021). Tales of a Minstrel of Reims in the Thirteenth Century. Translated by Rosenberg, Samuel N. Catholic University of America Press. ISBN 9780813234359.

Preceded by Margaret of Huntingdon	Duchess consort of Brittany; 1236–1283	Succeeded by Yolande of Dreux
