= Ramerupt =

Commune in Grand Est, France

- Commune
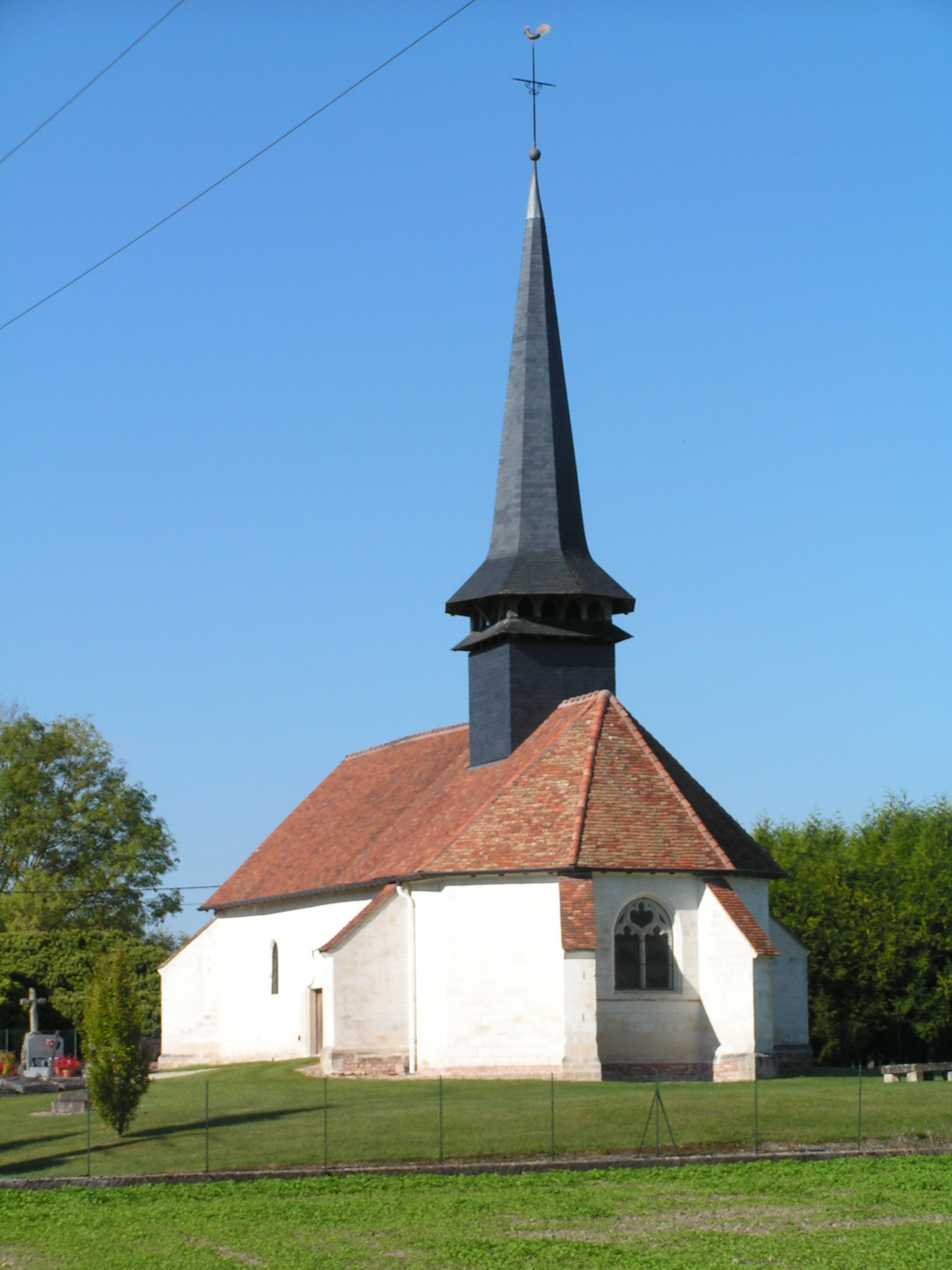
- The church in Ramerupt

- Coat of arms
- Location of Ramerupt
- Location within France Location within Grand Est
- Coordinates: 48°31′12″N 4°17′35″E
- Country: France
- Region: Grand Est
- Department: Aube
- Arrondissement: Troyes
- Canton: Arcis-sur-Aube

Government
  - Mayor (2020–2026): Gérald Tarin
- Area^{1}: 13.6 km^{2} (5.3 sq mi)
- Elevation: 101 m (331 ft)
- Highest elevation: 164 m (538 ft)
- Lowest elevation: 93 m (305 ft)
- Population (2023): 417
  - Density: 30.7/km^{2} (79.4/sq mi)
- Time zone: UTC+01:00 (CET)
  - Summer (DST): UTC+02:00 (CEST)
- INSEE/Postal code: 10314 /10240
- ^{1} French Land Register data, which excludes lakes, ponds, glaciers > 1 km^{2} (0.386 sq mi or 247 acres) and river estuaries.

Ramerupt (French pronunciation: [ʁamʁy]) is a commune in the Aube department in north-central France. In 1974, it absorbed the former commune Romaines.

== Population ==
Historical population
Year	Pop.	±% p.a.
1968	370	—
1975	329	−1.66%
1982	362	+1.37%
1990	347	−0.53%
1999	357	+0.32%
2007	385	+0.95%
2012	375	−0.52%
2017	408	+1.70%
2023	417	+0.36%
Source: INSEE

== Personalities ==
- Meir ben Samuel (1060-1135), also known as The RaM, French rabbi and tosafist
- Rashbam, medieval rabbi and scriptural commentator
- Rabbeinu Tam, medieval rabbi

== See also ==
- Communes of the Aube department
- Tosafists
