= Theobald III of Champagne =

Count of Champagne from 1197 to 1201

Theobald III
- Count of Champagne
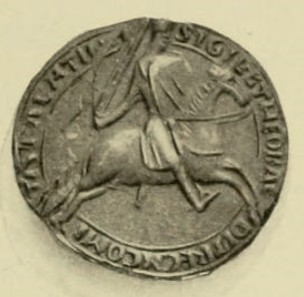
- Seal of Theobald III
- Born: 13 May 1179; Troyes
- Died: 24 May 1201 (aged 22); Troyes
- Noble family: House of Blois; House of Blois-Champagne
- Spouse: Blanche of Navarre (m. 1199)
- Issue: Theobald IV of Champagne
- Father: Henry I, Count of Champagne
- Mother: Marie of France

Theobald III (French: Thibaut; 13 May 1179 – 24 May 1201) was Count of Champagne from 1197 to his death. He was designated heir by his older brother Henry II when the latter went to the Holy Land on the Third Crusade, and succeeded him upon his death. He cooperated closely with his uncle and suzerain King Philip II of France. He died young, and was succeeded by a posthumous son, Theobald IV, while his widow, Blanche of Navarre, ruled as regent.

== Family ==
Theobald III was the younger son of Count Henry I of Champagne and Marie of France. He succeeded as count of Champagne in 1197 upon the death of his older brother Henry II. Theobald married Blanche of Navarre on 1 July 1199 at Chartres. They had two children, a daughter, Marie, and a son, Theobald IV, born after Theobald III's death.

== Rule ==
Charters were written by Theobald and King Philip II of France in September 1198 to dictate the rights of the Jews of the one vis-à-vis the other and to repay debts by Philip to the count of Champagne for the employment of his Jews. These laws were reinforced subsequently in charters that were signed between 1198 and 1231.

In 1198, Pope Innocent III called the Fourth Crusade. There was little enthusiasm for the crusade at first, but on 28 November 1199 various nobles of France gathered at Theobald's court for a tournament (in his castle at Ecry-sur-Aisne), including the preacher Fulk of Neuilly. (Note: Edgar McNeal and Robert Wolff both state that Villehardouin's account of the tournament makes no mention of Fulk of Neuilly and that Fulk's inclusion was the work of nineteenth-century writers(ex.Michaud, M. Pettitot).) There, they "took the cross", and elected Theobald their leader, but he died in 1201 and was replaced by Boniface I, Marquess of Montferrat.

Following his death on 24 May 1201, Theobald's widow Blanche ruled Champagne as regent for the following 21 years, during which the succession was contested by Theobald's nieces Alice and Philippa, daughters of his predecessor, Henry II. Theobald was buried beside his father, Henry, at the Church of Saint Stephen at Troyes.

== Genealogical table ==
Selective genealogy of the house of Champagne

Matilda of Carinthia	Theobald II of Champagne
Henry II of England	Eleanor of Aquitaine	Louis VII of France	Adela
Richard I of England	Henry I of Champagne	Marie of France	Philip II of France
Isabella I of Jerusalem	Henry II of Champagne	Theobald III of Champagne	Blanche of Navarre
Alice of Champagne	Philippa of Champagne	Theobald IV of Champagne

== Sources ==
- Evergates, Theodore (2007). The Aristocracy in the County of Champagne, 1100-1300. University of Pennsylvania Press. ISBN 978-0812201888.
- Evergates, Theodore (2011). Feudal Society in Medieval France: Documents from the County of Champagne. University of Pennsylvania Press. ISBN 978-0812200461.
- Evergates, Theodore (2018). Marie of France: Countess of Champagne, 1145-1198. University of Pennsylvania Press. ISBN 978-0812250770.
- McNeal, Edgar H. (1953). "Fulk of Neuilly and the Tournament of Écry". Speculum. 28 (2 April). doi:10.2307/2849695. JSTOR 2849695.
- McNeal, Edgar H.; Wolff, Robert Lee (1969). "The Fourth Crusade". In Setton, Kenneth M.; Wolff, Robert Lee; Hazard, Harry W. (eds.). The Later Crusades, 1189-1311. Vol. Two. University of Wisconsin Press.

Theobald III of Champagne House of Blois Born: 13 May 1179 Died: 24 May 1201
Preceded by Henry II	Count of Champagne; 1197–1201	Succeeded by Theobald IV
