= Theobald I of Navarre =

King of Navarre from 1234 to 1253

Theobald I
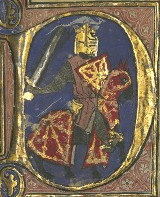
- Miniature of Theobald with the arms of Navarre

King of Navarre
- Reign: 1234 – 8 July 1253
- Predecessor: Sancho VII
- Successor: Theobald II

Count of Champagne
- Reign: 30 May 1201 – 8 July 1253
- Predecessor: Theobald III
- Successor: Theobald V
- Born: 30 May 1201; Troyes, County of Champagne
- Died: 8 July 1253 (aged 52); Pamplona, Kingdom of Navarre
- Burial: Pamplona Cathedral
- Spouses: Gertrude of Dagsburg; Agnes of Beaujeu; Margaret of Bourbon
- Issue more...: Blanche, Duchess of Brittany; Theobald II, King of Navarre; Beatrice, Duchess of Burgundy; Henry I, King of Navarre
- House: House of Blois
- Father: Theobald III, Count of Champagne
- Mother: Blanche of Navarre

Theobald I (French: Thibaut, Spanish: Teobaldo; 30 May 1201 – 8 July 1253), also called the Troubadour and the Posthumous, was Count of Champagne (as Theobald IV) from birth and King of Navarre from 1234. He initiated the Barons' Crusade, was famous as a trouvère, and was the first Frenchman to rule Navarre.

== Rule of Champagne ==
=== Regency of Champagne ===
Born in Troyes, he was the son of Theobald III of Champagne and Blanche of Navarre, the youngest daughter of Sancho VI of Navarre. His father died less than a week before he was born, and Blanche ruled the county as regent until Theobald turned twenty-one in 1222. He was a notable trouvère, and many of his songs have survived, including some with music.

The first half of Theobald's life was plagued by a number of difficulties. His uncle, Count Henry II, had left behind a great deal of debt, which was far from paid off when Theobald's father died. Further, Theobald's right to the succession was challenged by Henry's daughter Philippa and her husband, Erard I of Brienne, lord of Ramerupt and one of the more powerful nobles of Champagne.

The conflict with Erard and Philippa broke into open warfare in 1215 as the Champagne War of Succession, and was not resolved until after Theobald came of age in 1222. At that time he bought out their rights for a substantial monetary payment. Some years later, in 1234, he had to spend still more to buy off Philippa's elder sister Alice. The settlement of 1222 did not end Theobald's problems, for in the following years he antagonized King Louis VIII.

=== Conflict with the crown ===
Once he came of age Theobald personal rule was initially marked by a series of difficulties.

Theobald IV came into conflict with Louis VIII of France (1223–26) over the restrictive policies the new king tried to enforce on Jews in France. In his Etablissement sur les Juifs of November 8, 1223, Louis VIII declared that interest on Jews' debts should no longer hold good (though at the same time it also ordered that the capital should be repaid to the Jews in three years), that the debts due the Jews should be inscribed and placed under the control of their lords. The lords then collected the debts for the Jews, doubtless receiving a commission. Twenty-six barons accepted Louis VIII's new measures, but Theobald IV did not, since he had an agreement with the Jews that guaranteed their safety in return for extra income through taxation. Theobald IV and his mother had relied on this extra income during the Succession War of his minority. Champagne's capital at Troyes was where Rashi had lived a century before, and Champagne continued to have a prosperous Jewish population. Theobald IV's refusal to enact Louis VIII's new antagonistic policies towards the Jews enlarged a growing feud between the two men.

During the siege of Avignon in 1226, part of the Albigensian Crusade, due to his disagreements with the king, Theobald IV performed only the minimum service of 40 days and then went home. Louis VIII died of dysentery soon after he left, leading some to accuse Theobald IV of treachery. At the death of Louis VIII, Theobald's political situation was difficult: he had abandoned the king in his campaigns, there were rumors that he had poisoned him, and he was barred from the coronation of Louis IX (his mother Blanche went instead). At the beginning of the regency of Blanche of Castile, he abandoned a conspiracy against the French king, which also included Hugh X of Lusignan and Peter I of Brittany, and cemented a strong relation with the regent.

Strong rumors began to spread that Theobald IV was having an affair with Louis VIII's widow, the regent Blanche of Castile, for whom he composed a poetic homage. Queen Blanche and Theobald IV's father Theobald III were both grandchildren of Eleanor of Aquitaine. The first chronicler to report the rumors about a love affair between Theobald and Blanche was Roger of Wendover. Wendover claims that Theobald, "tormented by passion" for the queen, tried to poison King Louis VIII at the siege of Avignon. Matthew Paris adds a story that the French nobles goaded the young King Louis IX to challenge Theobald to a duel to avenge his father's death, but that Blanche put a stop to the duel. Theobald IV was becoming increasingly influential at court, and the other great counts of France were becoming resentful. It is possible that the rumors of an affair with the queen were indeed unfounded, and merely fabricated by other barons jealous of his position at court. In general, the other barons were jealous of the strengthened County of Champagne which had emerged from the Succession War, and now presented a major rival to surrounding areas.

Whatever the case, the resentful other barons invaded Champagne from 1229 to 1230. Ironically, the alliances in the invasion were reversed from the arrangement they had been in during the Succession War: Count Henry II of Bar attacked Champagne from the east, prompting Theobald IV to ally with Lorraine to attack the County of Bar. Simon of Joinville, who had fought for the rebel faction during the Succession War, now allied with Theobald IV against the external threat, and aided him in ravaging Bar, which was on the northern border of Joinville's own lands. The conflict with the County of Bar prompted the more powerful Duchy of Burgundy to invade Champagne from the south, led by Duke Hugh IV (his father Odo III, Blanche of Navarre's staunch ally, had died in 1218). This provoked Queen Blanche to intervene, in order to stop the spread of the conflict.

Theobald IV was able to repulse the attackers, but at great cost. Champagne's economy was so depleted by these two major wars, as well as the crusading debts of Theobald IV's father and uncle, that Theobald IV had to sell off his overlordship of the counties west of Paris that his ancestors held before expanding east to Champagne: Blois, Sancerre, and Chateaudun. Another major blow to morale came near the start of the invasion of 1229, when Blanche of Navarre died (of natural causes) while in retirement at Argensolles convent. Moreover, Theobald IV's second wife Agnes of Beaujeu suddenly died in 1231, leaving Theobald IV with only their five-year-old daughter, Blanche. This left Champagne in need of a male heir, prompting Theobald IV to remarry in 1232 to Margaret of Bourbon. The situation reached its nadir in 1233, when Henry II's elder daughter Queen Alice of Cyprus threatened to reprise the succession war of Theobald IV's minority yet again. Theobald IV was able to pay off Alice to make her abandon her claim, but this massive expenditure left him even further in debt.

== Rule of Navarre ==
Theobald succeeded his uncle Sancho VII of Navarre as King of Navarre. Theobald was in Pamplona at the time of Sancho's death and he immediately affirmed the fueros of the realm. This greatly increased his resources (not to mention his prestige), and the remaining years of his rule were far more peaceful and prosperous. The lords and barons of Northern France who had been in conflict with Theobald IV in 1229 left him in peace, realizing that as the new king of Navarre, his position was too strong to challenge.

=== Domestic and foreign policy ===
As king, Theobald sealed pacts with the Crown of Castile, the Crown of Aragon, and the Kingdom of England. He entrusted most of the government to nobles of Champagne and divided Navarre into four new districts based on fiscal functions and maintenance of public order. He began the codification of the law in the Cartulario Magno and set down on paper the Navarrese traditions known as the Fuero General, not systematically recorded until that time and kept up following Basque traditions in use on the different districts of the kingdom.

In order to gain the support of Castile, he had his daughter Blanche engaged to the future Alfonso X. By the marriage pact, Ferdinand III of León offered the lands of Guipúzcoa as long as Theobald lived, but not those of Álava to which the Navarrese monarchs had long laid claim. But with Guipúzcoa he would have attained direct access to the Cantabrian Sea. This alliance was never effected. The next year, Theobald engaged his daughter to Duke John I of Brittany, the son of his close crusading ally Peter of Dreux.

=== Barons' Crusade ===
It was in 1239 that Theobald directed a crusading host to the Holy Land. Militarily, the Barons' Crusade was not glorious, but it led to several diplomatic successes. He spent much time dallying at pleasant Acre (where he wrote a poem to his wife) before moving on Ascalon, where he began the construction of a castle. Whilst marching the crusader army to Ascalon, a contingent of 400 knights led by Hugh IV of Burgundy, Henry II of Bar, and Amaury de Montfort chose to engage Muslim forces at Gaza. The contingent was defeated before Theobald's forces arrived to rescue them.

Theobald negotiated with the Ayyubids of Damascus and Egypt, who were at odds with each other at the time, finalizing a treaty with the former (in the north) against the latter (in the south) whereby the Kingdom of Jerusalem regained Jerusalem itself, plus Bethlehem, Nazareth, and most of the region of Galilee with many Templar castles, such as Belfort and Saphet. He also negotiated a truce with the Egyptians. Some contemporary sources even imply that the whole of the land between the Jordan River and the Mediterranean was put back in crusader hands.

It is debatable how much of the ultimate success of the crusade (the most successful since the First in territorial terms) was attributable to Theobald's intentions and how much was just fortuitous. He returned from Palestine late in 1240, before Richard of Cornwall arrived, because he did not wish to be present during any more debating over the leadership and direction of the enterprise. Souvenirs that he brought back to Europe included the rose called "Provins" (Latin name rosa gallica 'officinalis', the Apothecary's Rose) from Damascus, transporting it "in his helmet"; a piece of the True Cross; and perhaps the Chardonnay grape which in modern times is an important component of champagne.

=== Conflict with Church and final years ===
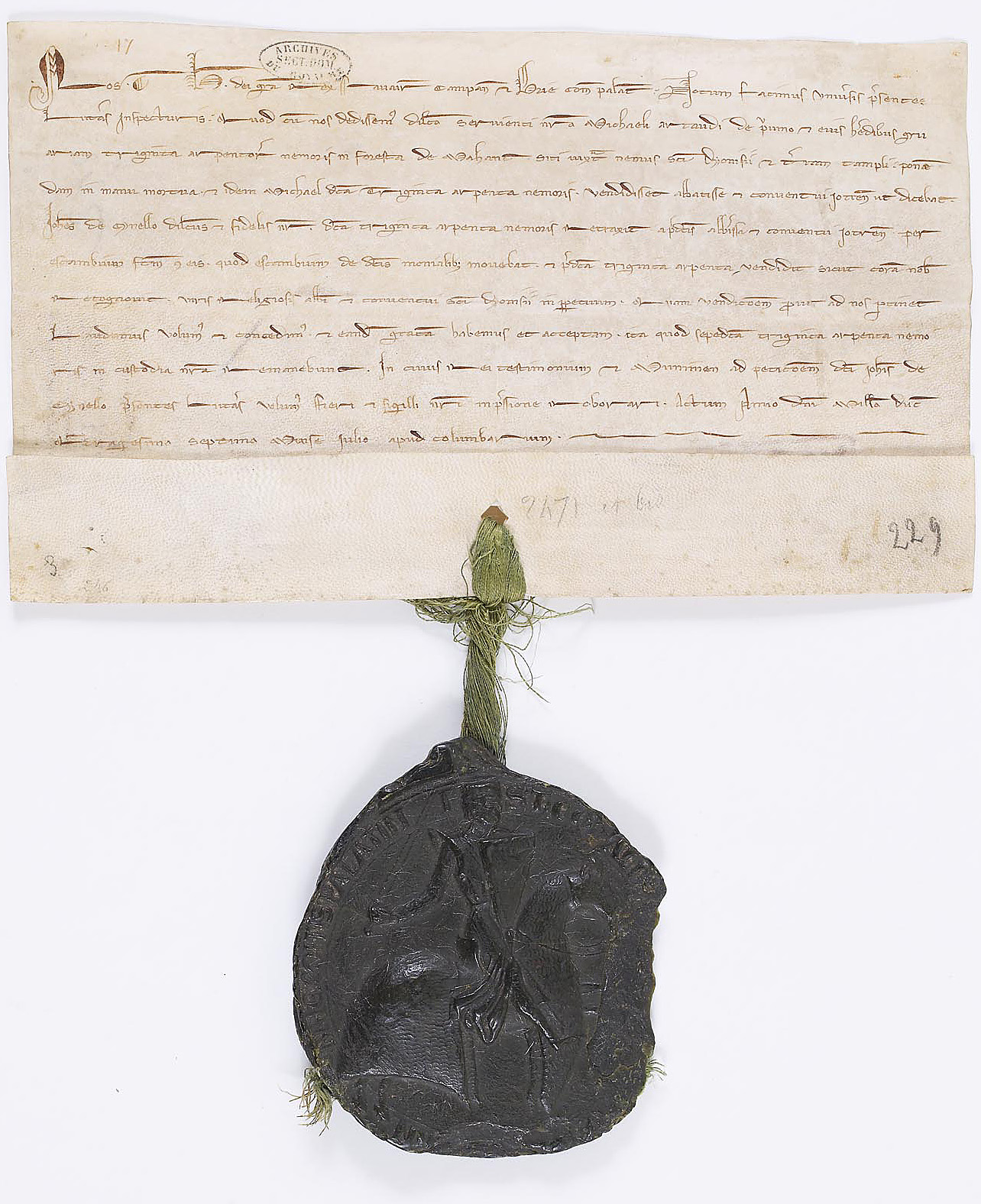
An original charter and seal of Theobald's, confirming the sale of a wood to the abbey of Saint-Denis.

Theobald spent most of the remainder of his reign travelling back and forth between Navarre and Champagne. He was at odds with the bishop of Pamplona, Pedro Jiménez de Gazólaz, who held a provincial synod in 1250 to excommunicate him. He refused to respond to papal tribunals, but Pope Innocent IV conceded him the privilege of kings: nobody could excommunicate him save the Holy See. Theobald died at Pamplona, on a return from one of his many visits to Champagne. He was buried in the Cathedral of Pamplona. He was succeeded first by his elder son Theobald II and then by his younger son Henry I.

== Marriages and issue ==
Theobald married three times. He married Gertrude of Dagsburg in 1220, and divorced her two years later when he came of age. They had no children.

Secondly, in 1222, he married Agnes of Beaujeu. The marriage produced at least one child:

- Blanche of Navarre, Duchess of Brittany

Agnes died in 1231. Theobald married thirdly to Margaret of Bourbon. Theobald and Margaret had six children:

- Eleanor (born 1233, died young)
- Peter (died young)
- Margaret, in 1255 married to Frederick III, Duke of Lorraine
- Theobald II of Navarre, married Isabella, daughter of Louis IX of France
- Beatrix, married Hugh IV, Duke of Burgundy
- Henry I of Navarre, married Blanche of Artois

Theobald had at least two daughters out of wedlock.

- With an unknown mistress, he had Agnes, who married Álvar Pérez de Azagra, 4th Lord of Albarracín. (Note: In March 1238, Pedro Fernández de Azagra and king Theobald agreed on the marriage of Álvar and Inés. The agreement was reached in Tudela and is recorded in the Royal Charters, Tome II of the Archivo General de Navarra.)
- With Marquesa López de Rada, daughter of Lope Díaz de Rada and Brunisende of Narbonne, he had Marquesa Gil de Rada, who married Pedro Fernández, baron of Hijar, illegitimate son of king Jaime I of Aragon.

== Sources ==
- Burgtorf, Jochen (2011). "Battle of Gaza (1239)". In Mikaberidze, Alexander (ed.). Conflict and Conquest in the Islamic World: A Historical Encyclopedia. Vol. I. ABC-CLIO.
- Evergates, Theodore (2007). The Aristocracy in the County of Champagne, 1100-1300. University of Pennsylvania Press.
- Fray, Jean-Luc (2007). Villes et bourgs de Lorraine: réseaux urbains et centralité au Moyen Âge (in French). Presses Universitaires Blaise-Pascal.
- George, Hereford Brooke (1875). Genealogical tables illustrative of modern history. Oxford at the Clarendon Press.
- O'Callaghan, Joseph F. (1975). A History of Medieval Spain. Cornell University Press.
- Richard, Jean (1999). The Crusades, C.1071-c.1291. Translated by Birrell, Jean. Cambridge University Press.
- Tyerman, Christopher (2006). God's War:A New History of the Crusades. Penguin Books.
- Tyers, Theresa (2018). "A Delite for the Senses: Three Healing Plants in Medieval Gardens, the Lily, the Rose, and the Woodland Strawberry". In Skinner, Patricia; Tyers, Theresa (eds.). The Medieval and Early Modern Garden in Britain: Enclosure and Transformation, C. 1200-1750. Taylor & Francis.
- William of Puylaurens (2003). The Chronicle of William of Puylaurens: The Albigensian Crusade and its Aftermath. Translated by Sibly, W.A.; Sibly, M.D. Boydell Press.

Theobald I of Navarre House of Blois Born: 30 May 1201 Died: 8 July 1253
Regnal titles
Preceded by Theobald III	Count of Champagne; 1201–1253	Succeeded by Theobald II
Preceded by Sancho VII	King of Navarre; 1234–1253	Succeeded by Theobald II
