= List of counts and dukes of Chartres =

The arms of the town of Chartres in France, the town associated with the titles Count and Duke of Chartres

Originally, the Duchy of Chartres (duché de Chartres) was the county (comté) of Chartres, France. The title of count of Chartres thus became duke of Chartres. This duchy–peerage was given by Louis XIV of France to his nephew, Philippe II d'Orléans, at his birth in 1674. Philippe II was the younger son and heir of the king's brother, Philippe I, Duke of Orléans.

== Carolingian count ==
- 882-886 Hastein, Viking chieftain, beat Carloman II of France in 879, agreed to settle and received the County of Chartres. He sold it in 886 to finance an expedition during which he disappeared.

== Hereditary counts ==
=== House of Blois ===
The northern portion of the County of Blois, bordering on Normandy, was sometimes alienated as the County of Chartres, but the Counts of Blois who possessed it did not use a separate title for it. In 1391, the death of the only son of Guy II, Count of Blois prompted him to sell the inheritance of the County of Blois to Louis I, Duke of Orléans, merging the title into the royal dukedom.

- 960-975 Theobald I of Blois († 975), Count of Blois and Chartres, which he took in 960

Married to Luitgarde of Vermandois

Theobold I was also known as Theobald the Cheat, or Theobald the Old. He was given the nickname “the Cheat” fighting with his neighbours, among them the kings of France, the dukes of Normandy, and the church of Reims.

- 975-995 Odo I, Count of Blois, († 995), Count of Chartres, and Reims (982-995), son of the previous

Married to Bertha of Burgundy

- 995-1004 Theobald II of Blois († 1004), Count of Blois, Chartres and Reims, the son of the previous
- 1004-1037 Odo II of Blois († 1037), Count of Blois, Chartres, Reims, Meaux and Troyes, brother of the previous

Married first in 1003 to Mathilde de Normandie († 1006)
Married second to Ermengearde of Auvergne

- 1037-1089 Theobald III, Count of Blois (1019 † 1089), Count of Blois, Chartres, Meaux and Troyes son of Eudes II and Ermengearde d'Auvergne

Married first to Gersende of Maine
Married second to Adele of Valois

- 1089-1102 Stephen II, Count of Blois († 1102), Count of Blois, Chartres and Meaux, son of Thibaut III and Gersende of Maine.

Married to Adela of Normandy

- 1102-1151 Theobald II, Count of Champagne († 1152), Count of Blois, Chartres and Meaux, and then Count of Champagne in 1125, son of the former.

Married in 1123 to Matilda of Carinthia († 1161)

- 1151-1191 Theobald V, Count of Blois († 1191), Count of Blois and Chartres, son of the former.

Married first to Sibylle of Châteaurenard
Married second in 1164 to Alix of France

- 1191-1205 Louis I, Count of Blois († 1205), Count of Blois and Chartres, son of the previous and Alix de France

Married in 1184 to Catherine of Clermont

- 1205-1218 Theobald VI, Count of Blois († 1218), son of the previous

Married first to Mahaut of Alençon
Married second to Clemence des Roches

- 1218-1248 Isabelle († 1248), Countess of Chartres and castellan of Romorantin

Married first to Sulpice III d'Amboise
Married second to Jean II de Montmirail († 1244).

=== House of Amboise ===
- 1248-1256 Matilda of Amboise († 1256), Countess of Chartres

Married to Richard II, Count of Beaumont, then to Jean II de Nesle

=== House of Blois-Châtillon ===
Theobald V, Count of Blois married his second wife in 1164 to Alix of France and father of:

Margaret, Countess of Blois, married to Walter II of Avesnes, mother of:

Mary, Countess of Blois († 1241), married to Hugues de Châtillon (v.1196 † 1248), Count of Saint-Pol, mother of:

- 1256-1280 John I, Count of Blois († 1280), son of the previous

Married 1254 to Alice of Brittany (1243-1288)

- 1280-1286 Joan, Countess of Blois († 1292), daughter of the previous

Married 1272 to Peter of France († 1284), Count of Alençon and Valois. In 1286, she sold the county of Chartres to Philip IV of France

== Counts apanage ==
=== House of Valois ===
- 1290-1302 and 1310-1325 Charles, Count of Valois, (1270 † 1325), Count of Valois, Alençon, Perche, Chartres, Anjou and Maine

Married first to Margaret, Countess of Anjou and Maine (1273 † 1299)
Married second to Catherine I, Latin Empress (1274 † 1308)
Married third to Mahaut of Châtillon (1293 † 1358), cousin of Jeanne de Blois-Châtillon

- 1302-1310 John of Valois (1302-1310), Count of Chartres, son of Charles of Valois and Catherine I
- 1325-1328 Louis of Valois, Count of Chartres (1318-1328), Count of Chartres, son of Charles of Valois and Mahaut of Châtillon
- 1328-1346 Charles II of Alençon (1297 † 1346), Count of Alençon, Chartres, son of Charles of Valois and Margaret of Anjou
- 1510-1528 Renée of France (1510 † 1574), Duchess of Chartres, daughter of Louis XII of France and Anne of Brittany, married to Ercole II d'Este, Duke of Ferrara

== Dukes of Chartres ==
The arms of the city of Chartres.

After its revival and elevation, the title duc de Chartres was used by the House of Orléans, founded by Philippe I, Duke of Orléans, and cadet branch of the House of Bourbon.

=== Branch of Capetian de Valois ===
- Renée of France (1509 † 1575), daughter of Louis XII and Anne of Brittany, married to Ercole II d'Este, duke of Ferrara
- Alfonso II d'Este, duke of Ferrara, their son.

=== Fils de France ===
- 1626-1660 Gaston, Duke of Orléans, (1608–1660) son of King Henry IV
- 1660-1674 Philippe I, Duke of Orléans, (1640–1701 ) son of King Louis XIII

=== Branch of Capetian d'Orleans ===
From 1674 until today, the title of Duke of Chartres is the eldest son of the Duke of Orleans

- 1674-1701 Philippe II, called "the Pious" (1674–1723) son of preceding;
- 1703-1723 Louis IV (1703–1752) son of the previous;
- 1725-1752 Louis Philippe I, Duke of Orléans, "the Fat" (1725–1785) son of preceding;
- 1752-1785 Louis Philippe II, Duke of Orléans (1747–1793) son of the previous waives his title in 1792 and takes the name of "Philippe Égalité";
- 1785-1793 Louis Philippe III, Duke of Orléans (1773–1850) son of preceding. Access to power in 1830 under the name of Louis-Philippe I^{er};
- 1810-1830 Ferdinand-Philippe (1810–1842) son of preceding;
- 1840-1910 Robert, son of Ferdinand-Philippe and thus grandson of King Louis-Philippe of France.

=== After 1848 ===
- Evangeline Viviane Eugénie, duchesse de Montpensier, duchesse de Nevers et de Chartres (1974), fille aînée de Louis-Ferdinand, duc d'Angoulême (1942), et d'Henriette de Savoie-Carignan (1944).

== In fiction ==
The silent film Monsieur Beaucaire (1924) is the story of a fictional Duke of Charters, played by Rudolph Valentino, who woos Princess Henriette of France. At this time in history, the title was held by Louis Philippe "the Fat". In the Booth Tarkington source novel, the character is called the Duke of Chateaurien.
