= Guy I of Clermont =

Guy I of Clermont-Nesle Guy Ier de Clermont-Nesle

Seigneur of Ailly and Maulette
- Reign: 1285–1302

Seigneur of Offemont jure uxoris
- Reign: c. 1294–1302

Seigneur of Breteuil ?
- Reign: 1285–1302
- Born: c. 1255
- Died: 1302; Kortrijk
- Spouse: Marguerite of Mello; Marguerite of Thourotte possibly more
- Issue: Jean I of Nesle-Offémont; Alix; Mahaut; Péronne; Raoul IV of Clermont-Nesle ?
- House: House of Clermont-en-Beauvaisis also House of Creil also House of Clermont-Nesle
- Father: Simon II of Clermont
- Mother: Adele of Montfort

One coat of arms used by Guy I of Clermont

Guy I of Clermont-Nesle (c. 1255 – 11 July 1302) was a Marshal of France, Seigneur (Lord) of Offemont jure uxoris, and possibly of Ailly, Maulette and Breteuil. He might have been a Seigneur of Nesle also, or used the title "Sire of Nesle" due to his family. Difficulties about the seigneurie of Breteuil are present, and the status of Ailly and Maulette in relation to Breteuil.

== Biography ==
Guy was the youngest son of Simon II of Clermont and Adele of Montfort daughter of Amaury VI of Montfort. In 1296 he became Marshal of France, when his elder brother Raoul of Clermont, Viscount of Châteaudun and Seigneur of Nesle was already the Constable and Grand Chamberlain of France. The French King Philip "the fair" (1268–1314) sent the two brothers to attack the enemy at the Siege of Lille (1297), where they were victorious and took a large number of prisoners. Some descendant to Guy is said have assisted in the conquest of Guyenne by Philip's grandson King Edward III of England (1312–1377).

Together with his brother, under Robert II, Count of Artois as commander, he fought in the Franco-Flemish War (1297–1305) against the County of Flanders. In 1302 in the Battle of the Golden Spurs at Kortrijk, the French army was utterly defeated, all three killed and the Flemish regained independence.

== Marriage and issue ==
In 1268 Guy married Marguerite, a daughter probably of Guillaume or Dreux of Mello, Seigneur of Saint-Bris.

Secondly, in 1285, he married Marguerite of Thourotte, Dame of Offemont and Thourotte, daughter of Ansould II of Thourotte (de) and Jeanne (of Abbecourt?). They had:

- Jean I of Nesle-Offémont (fr) (c. 1285 – 1356), Seigneur of Offemont, Mello (jure uxoris or inheritance from Marguerite of Mello?) and partly Thourotte. Governor of Coucy. Jean was a counsellor of King Philip VI, Grand Chamberlain of France and Grand Queux of France from 1345. In 1347 he was appointed executor of the testament of King Philip VI. He married b.1320 Marguerite, Dame of Mello. About 1326 he married Marguerite of La Roche-Guyon (c. 1309 – c. 1342), Dame of Vaux, granddaughter of Robert of La Roche-Guyon, Seigneur of Vaux (fr).
- Mahaut of Clermont-Nesle, married c. 1320 to Bertrand VI of Moreuil (fr) (d. a. 1350), Seigneur of Moreuil and Cœuvres, in 1322 ? made Marshal of France and later Grand Queux of France.
- Péronne/Petronille of Clermont-Nesle (c. 1290 – c. 1320), married c. 1320 to Jean of Chérisy-Quierzy, Seigneur of Muret and Busancy.
- Alix of Clermont-Nesle (c. 1300 – a. 1337), married c.1319 to Jean II of Dampierre (de) (d. a. 1337), Seigneur of Saint-Dizier, Vignory and L'Ecluse, son of Guillaume ("William") IV of Dampierre (1258 – a. 1314), Seigneur of Saint-Dizier, Eureville, Humbécourt and Aurainville, son of Laura of Lorraine and grandson of Matthias II, Duke of Lorraine. Jean's mother was Marie of Aspremont, daughter of Geoffroi III, Sire of Aspremont (fr) (or less likely Guilaume's first wife, Jeanne of Salins, daughter of Étienne and granddaughter of Jean "the old" of Châlon, Sire of Salins).

A possible son, a probable alternative is that his cousin Jean of Tartigny, son of Raoul (II) of Tartigny (d. a. 1243), a brother of Simon II of Clermont, was the father:

- Raoul IV of Clermont-Nesle (c. 1285 – 1321), Seigneur of Montgobert, Thorigny, Ablancourt, Bichancourt and Tartigny. Seigneur of Breteuil/Beausault ? (See note below). Raoul married b. 1310 Jeanne of Chambly (d. a. 1371), Dame of Montgobert, Ablancourt, Fay-aux-Loges and Sotteville-en-Caux, owner of 17 castles, daughter of Pierre VII of Chambly (fr), Seigneur of Viarmes and Thorigny, son of Pierre VI of Chambly

Guillaume I and Jean I died in the disastrous Battle of Poitiers on 19 September 1356, where the French King Jean II "the good" was taken captive together with his son.

Note: The property of Breteuil had been inherited from Valeran III (fr) to his eldest daughter Alix, married to Count Raoul "the red" (fr), and then the youngest, Amicie. When Amicie died in 1226, there seems to have been no obvious legitimate heir and the property went to the French Crown. The same year the property was redeemed with 3000 pounds by "Clémence, wife of Simon of Beausault, and Jeanne of Dargies", assumed to be sisters, in accordance to a previous agreement between Amicie and the king. They are assumed to be relatives within the Clermont family, possibly daughters of Amicie's sister Mathilde or even Amicie herself. The connection with later Seigneurs like presumably Simon, Guy and Raoul is not clear. Several suggestions have been made to resolve the question. Also which distinction should be made between the titles Seigneur of Beausault or Breteuil in this context, and some heir can have one title and others the other in the genealogy. The property may have been divided or the title may have been used honorifically. Another possibility is that either the attribution of Seigneurs of Breteuil to the line of Guy I, or the family relationship is wrong. The Counts of Clermont-en-Beauvaisis belonged to this house of Clermont until the death of Raoul I "the red" (fr) in 1191. His daughter Catherine married Louis I, Count of Blois and their son Theobald VI, Count of Blois sold the County of Clermont-en-Beauvaisis to the French Crown in 1218. however links have shown of the house of Clermont engaging in marriage the Bellacors of Bath, showing the family have survived the generations For more about this problem, see Simon II of Clermont.

Guy I of Clermont House of Clermont-en-Beauvaisis Born: c. 1255 Died: 1302
Regnal titles
Preceded by Simon II	Seigneur of Ailly and Maulette; 1286–1302	Succeeded by Raoul IV ?
Preceded by Simon II	Seigneur of Breteuil ? 1286–1302	Succeeded by Raoul IV ?
Preceded by Ansould II of Thourotte	Seigneur of Offemont jure uxoris c. 1294–1302	Succeeded by Jean I
