= House of Clermont =

French noble family

- Country: France
- Founded: 1042; 984 years ago
- Founder: Renaud I Count of Clermont
- Final ruler: Catherine, Countess of Clermont
- Titles: Constable of France; Grand Chamberlain of France; Marshal of France; Counts of Clermont-en-Beauvaisis; Lord of Nesle; Lord of Ailly
- Dissolution: 1213; 813 years ago
- Cadet branches: House of Clermont-Nesle

The House of Clermont is a noble family of the French region of Picardy dating from the 10th century and included both the early counts of Clermont-en-Beauvaisis as well as many Constables of France. The house eventually merged with the House of Nesle with the marriage of Raoul II of Clermont and Gertrude of Nesle. The family is the sometimes referred to as the House of Clermont-Nesle (Maison de Clermont-Nesle).

The founders of the House of Clermont are known by name only and are among the early counts of Clermont-en-Beauvaisis:

- Baldwin I of Clermont (through 1023)
- Baldwin II of Clermont (1023–1042), son of Baldwin I
- Renaud I of Clermont (1042–1088), son-in-law of Baldwin II.

The first Clermont for which there is any information is Hugh I, Count of Clermont-en-Beauvaisis (1030–1102), son of Renaud I. Hugh married Marguerite, daughter of Hilduin IV, Count of Montdidier. Among their children were:

- Renaud II, Hugh's successor as count (see below)
- Ermentrude, who married Hugh d’Avranches (Hugh the Fat), 1st Earl of Chester. Many of their children died in the White Ship disaster of 1120.
- Adelaide, who married Gilbert Fitz Richard, Lord of Clare. Many of their children were prominent in 12th century England.

Renaud II, Count of Clermont-en-Beauvaisis, son of Hugh, was the next prominent member of the House of Clermont. Renaud took the Cross as part of the First Crusade and participated in the siege of Nicaea and the Battle of Dorylaeum in 1097. He married three times: First, to Adelaide, daughter of Herbert IV, Count of Vermandois. Their daughter Marguetite married first to Charles I, Count of Flanders, the only son of Canute IV, King of Denmark, and, widowed, then to Hugh II, Count of Saint-Pol. Renaud's second wife's name is unknown (not atypical for this era). The union produced three prominent children:

- Raoul I the Red, Renaud's successor as the Count of Clermont-en-Beauvaisis
- Simon I, Seigneur of Ailly-sur-Noye
- Mathilde, who married Alberic III, Count of Dammartin. Their daughter Marie, Countess of Ponthieu, was in turn the mother of Joan, Countess of Ponthieu, who married Ferdinand III, King of Castile. Their daughter Eleanor of Castile married Edward I Longshanks, King of England, and had numerous children including Edward II, King of England.

Renaud's third wife was Clemence de Bar, daughter of Reginald I, Count of Bar. Renaud and Clemence had six children.

At this point, the House of Clermont splits into two branches: the descendants of Raoul I the Red and those of Simon I.

Raoul the Red was both count and the Constable of France (the first of many in the House of Clermont) under Philip II of France. Raoul married Alix, daughter of Valerian III, Seigneur of Breteuil, and had a daughter who married Louis I, Count of Blois, a grandson of Louis VII of France and Eleanor of Aquitaine. Louis became Count of Clermont-en-Beauvaisis jure uxoris Their son Theobald VI was the last of the dynasty of Counts of Clermont-en-Beauvaisis, selling the county to the crown in 1218.

Simon I, Seigneur of Ailly-sur-Noye, lived from 1134 to 1187. Simon married Mathilde de Breteuil, daughter of Valeran III, Seigneur de Breteuil-en-Beauvaisis, and his wife Holdeburge, Dame d’Ailly-sur-Noye and Tartigny. Simon and Mathilde had four children, including Raoul II of Clermont. Raoul II, can be regarded as the founder of the House of Clermont-Nesle. Raoul married Gertrude de Nesle, daughter of John de Nesle and Elizabeth van Petegem. John's brother was Conon, Count of Soissons, and so their father was Yves II, Count of Soissons, making John and therefore Gertrude members of the House of Nesle. Raoul II and Gertrude had six children including Simon II.

Simon II of Clermont-Nesle (1210–1286) was Seigneur of Ailly, Maulette and (jure uxoris) of Nesle. Simon married Adelaide, daughter of Amaury VI of Montfort, and had numerous children including:

- Raoul III of Clermont-Nesle Simon III of Clermont-Nestle, Bishop of Noyon and Beauvais
- Guy I of Clermont, Marshall of France
- Philippa, married to Robert VII Bertrand (d.1300), Seigneur of Bricquebec. Among their children was Robert-Jean Bertran, Baron of Briquebec, Viscount of Roncheville and Marshal of France.

Raoul III of Clermont-Nestle was Constable of France and fought in the Eighth Crusade with Louis IX of France. He married Alix of Dreux, daughter of Robert of Dreux and Clemence, Viscountess of Châteaudun.

The descendants of Simon II and Raoul III continued the House of Clermont for many subsequent generations, playing a major role in the later medieval country of France.

== Sources ==
Prime, Temple, Note on the County of Clermont, Notes Relative to Certain Matters Connected with French History, De Vinne Press, New York, 1903 (available on Google Books)

Dormay, C., Histoire de la ville de Soissons et de ses rois, ducs, comtes et gouverneurs, Soissons, 1664 (available on Google Books)

Galbert de Bruges, The Murder, Betrayal, and Slaughter of the Glorious Charles, Count of Flanders, translated by John Jeffrey Rider, Yale University Press, 2013.
