= Isabelle of Chartres =

French noblewoman (died 1248 or 1249)

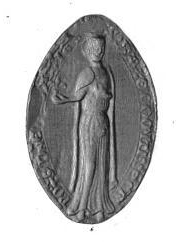
Isabelle's seal.

Isabelle of Blois or Elizabeth of Blois (died 1248 or 1249) was the lady of Amboise by marriage and from 1218 until her death the countess of Chartres in her own right. She founded three Cistercian houses for nuns. Twice widowed, she was succeeded by her daughter, Matilda.

== Family ==
Isabelle (Elizabeth) was born probably before 1180. She belonged to the highest nobility of France. She was the younger daughter of Count Theobald V of Blois and Chartres and Alice, daughter of King Louis VII and the Duchess Eleanor of Aquitaine. She had a brother, Count Louis I of Blois; an older sister, Margaret; and another sister, Alice, who was the abbess of Fontevraud between 1209 and 1218.

Isabelle was married twice. In 1190, she was married to Sulpice III of Amboise. They had six children: Hugh, Matilda, John, William, Alice and Dionysia. Sometime before 1209, Sulpice and Isabelle jointly founded the Cistercian priory of Moncé. When Sulpice died, sometime between 1214 and 1218, Hugh inherited Amboise. He in turn was succeeded by Matilda around 1237. The fates of the four younger children of Isabelle and Sulpice are unknown. Isabelle made several gifts to Moncé for the benefit of Sulpice's soul, including endowing a priest there to say mass daily. In 1218, she married John II, lord of Montmirail and Oisy. No children of her second marriage are known.

== Countess ==
When Isabelle's nephew, Count Theobald VI, died without heirs in 1218, his counties were divided between his aunts. The initiative to divide them came from King Philip II. Margaret received Blois and Isabelle received Chartres. Her husband, John, paid a feudal relief to the king, who in August confirmed Isabelle's succession to the county and to some associated castellanies with her cousin, Count William II of Perche, standing as surety. In July 1221, William gave Montigny-le-Chartif to his cousin and her heirs.

In 1222, Isabelle and John founded the Cistercian nunnery of Lieu-Notre-Dame on her property in the castellany of Romorantin. This foundation lay on the edge of the marshy wilderness known as the Sologne and the nuns were given 36 arpents to bring under cultivation. In 1232, Isabelle's daughter Matilda and her husband, Richard II of Beamont, granted the nuns a further 100 arpents rent free if they brought it under cultivation.

In 1226, with the help of the bishop of Chartres and the Benedictine abbot of Saint-Père-en-Vallée, Isabelle and John founded the Cistercian nunnery of Notre-Dame de l'Eau on land purchased from Lady Adeline of Ver. Isabelle's charters for Lieu are well preserved in a cartulary compiled in 1269 or 1270, but many of those for Eau were lost in a 16th-century fire. Today, 92 of her charters for Lieu and 35 for Eau survive. Besides her own foundations, Isabelle was generous with other houses favoured by her family. She made or confirmed donations to the abbeys of Saint-Antoine-des-Champs, Notre-Dame-la-Trappe, Notre-Dame de Barbeau, Notre-Dame de Vaucelles, Notre-Dame-des-Clairets and La Madeleine de Châteaudun, as well as the almshouse of Châteaudun and the leprosarium of Grand-Beaulieu.

In 1226, William of Perche died, leaving Isabelle his share of the income from the mills of Chartres for "support of the poor". She gave it to the nunnery at Eau. Isabelle's second husband died in 1238 or 1239. For the sake of his soul, she gave 435 livres tournois as alms for the poor.

In 1241, Isabelle's niece, Countess Mary of Blois, died, leaving her entire estate, including the county of Blois, to her husband, Count Hugh, and Isabelle. Hugh maintained control. In 1247, Isabelle drew up her will, confirming all her previous gifts to Lieu. She also endowed a chapel there for masses to be said daily for her, her family and her cousin, Queen Blanche. In 1248, she bought back property at Saugirard, which her brother had given to the abbey of Barzelle before 1205, in order to bestow it on the nuns of Lieu.

Isabelle died in 1248 or 1249. She was succeeded by her widowed daughter Matilda.

== Bibliography ==
- Armstrong-Partida, Michelle (2005). "Mothers and Daughters as Lords: The Countesses of Blois and Chartres". Medieval Prosopography. 26: 77–107. JSTOR 44946466.
- Berman, Constance Hoffman (2009). "Noble Women's Power as Reflected in the Foundations of Cistercian Houses for Nuns in Thirteenth-Century Northern France: Port-Royal, les Clairets, Moncey, Lieu and Eau-lez-Chartres". In Katherine Smith; Scott Wells (eds.). Negotiating Community and Difference in Medieval Europe: Gender, Power, Patronage and the Authority of Religion in Latin Christendom. Brill. pp. 137–149.
- Berman, Constance Hoffman (2018). The White Nuns: Cistercian Abbeys for Women in Medieval France. University of Pennsylvania Press.
- Evergates, Theodore (2007). The Aristocracy in the County of Champagne, 1100–1300. University of Pennsylvania Press.
- Johnson, Penelope D. (1991). Equal in Monastic Profession: Religious Women in Medieval France. University of Chicago Press.
- Livingstone, Amy (2010). Out of Love for My Kin: Aristocratic Family Life in the Lands of the Loire, 1000–1200. Cornell University Press.
- Shadis, Miriam; Berman, Constance Hoffman (2003). "A Taste of the Feast: Reconsidering Eleanor of Aquitaine's Female Descendants". In Bonnie Wheeler; John Carmi Parsons (eds.). Eleanor of Aquitaine: Lord and Lady. Palgrave Macmillan. pp. 177–211.
- Thompson, Kathleen Hapgood (1995). The Counts of the Perche, c. 1066–1217 (PhD diss.). University of Sheffield.
- Williams, Jane Welch (1993). Bread, Wine, and Money: The Windows of the Trades at Chartres Cathedral. University of Chicago Press.
