= Simon of Clermont-Nesle (bishop) =

Simon of Clermont-Nesle (after 1250 – 22 December 1312 or c. February 1313), Peer of France and bishop of Noyon (1297–1301) and Bishop-count of Beauvais (1301–c. 1312).

Simon was one of few bishops that supported King Philip IV "the fair" of France against Pope Boniface VIII (c. 1235–1303), to strengthen the monarchy and make the Church support the state's finances in the time of war, while the Pope demanded the privilege of exemption from tax, in spite of extreme wealth, and proclaimed that the Pope is above every king in authority, but the king engaged the best available lawyers for his case. The conflict led in 1309 to the moving of the Papal court, under Pope Clement V (c. 1264–1314), to Avignon, outside the king's realm.

== Family background ==
Simon was a son of Simon II of Clermont, Seigneur of Ailly, Maulette and Nesle (c. 1216–1286) by Adele of Montfort (d. 1279), daughter of Amaury VI of Montfort. The father was a counsellor of King "Saint" Louis IX of France and was appointed regent ("lieutenant") while the king went away on the Seventh Crusade.

Simon had three brothers and at least one sister, whose son was the famous Robert VIII Bertrand (fr), a Marshal of France. His brothers were famous French generals, Raoul of Clermont, Viscount of Châteaudun and Seigneur of Nesle, Constable and Grand Chamberlain of France, and Guy I of Clermont, Marshal of France, Seigneur of Offemont and Ailly, both killed 1302 in the Battle of the Golden Spurs.

== Ancestry ==
Ancestors of Simon of Clermont-Nesle (bishop)

Renaud II, Count of Clermont-en-Beauvaisis (fr) (c. 1075 - b. 1162)
Simon I, Seigneur of Ailly-sur-Noye (fr) (c. 1134-a. 1187); Constable of France
Clémence (daughter of Reginald I, Count of Bar ?)
Raoul I of Clermont-Nesle, Seigneur of Ailly (fr) (c. 1185-1225)
Valeran III, Sire of Breteuil-en-Beauvaisis (fr) (d. 1162)
Mathilde of Breteuil (d. 1208)
Holdeburge, Dame of Ailly-sur-Noye and Tartigny (d. a. 1156)
Simon II of Clermont (c. 1216-1286); Seigneur of Ailly, Maulette and Nesle
Raoul II of Nesle (nl), Châtelain (Burggraf) of Bruges (d. 1153/1160)
Jean of Nesle, Châtelain of Bruges (d. 1197/1200)
Gertrude of Montaigu (d. a. 10 September 1185) daughter of Lambert (d. a. 1140), Count of Clermont and Montaigu
Gertrude of Nesle (1175-1239) *
Jan I of Peteghem (c. 1107-1154) ?
Elisabeth of Peteghem/Lambersart ? (1158-1209?)
Petronille of Avesnes (Oisy) (d. a. 1174) ? daughter of Gauthier I of Oisy, Seigneur of Avesnes ?
Simon II of Clermont-Nesle; Bishop of Noyon and Beauvais, Peer of France
Simon, Seigneur of Montfort l'Amaury (fr) (d. c. 1188)
Simon de Montfort, 5th Earl of Leicester (1165-1218)
Amicia of Beaumont, daughter of Robert de Beaumont, 3rd Earl of Leicester
Amaury VI/VII, Count of Montfort (fr) (1195–1241); Constable of France, Titular Duke of Narbonne
Bouchard IV/V de Montmorency (de) (d. 1189)
Alix de Montmorency (d. c. 1220)
Laurette (1150-1181), daughter of Baldwin IV, Count of Hainaut
Adele of Montfort-l'Amaury (d. 1279), Dame of Houdan
Hugh III of Burgundy (1142-1192)
Andre/Guigues VI (1184-1237) dauphin of Viennois, count of Albon, Grenoble, Oisans and Briançon
Béatrice of Albon (1161-1228)
Beatrix of Viennois/Burgundy (1205-1248)
Rainon I of Sabran (it) (1160-1224)
Beatrice, Countess of Gap and Embrun (1182 – b. 1248)
Garsenda, daughter of Guglielmo IV of Forcalquier

* Not to be confused with fr:Gertrude de Nesle-Soissons (1185-1220), daughter of her paternal uncle Raoul "the good" of Nesle, Count of Soissons and Alix of Dreux.

Simon of Clermont-Nesle (bishop) House of Clermont-en-Beauvaisis Born: a. 1245 Died: c. 1313
Regnal titles
Preceded by Guy II des Prés (Prez)	Bishop of Noyon and Peer of France; 1297–1301	Succeeded by Pierre II of Ferrières
Preceded by Theobald of Nanteuil	Bishop-count of Beauvais and Peer of France; 1301–c. 1313	Succeeded by Jean de Marigny
