= Simon II of Clermont =

Simon II of Clermont Simon II de Clermont
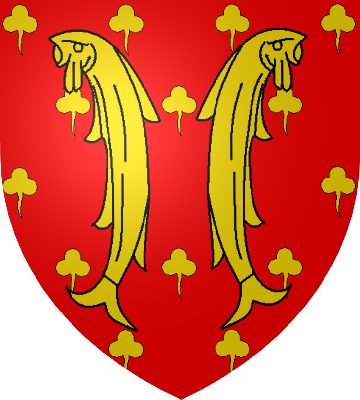

Seigneur of Ailly
- Reign: 1226–1286

Seigneur of Nesle
- Reign: 1226–1286
- Born: c. 1216
- Died: 1286
- Spouse: Adele of Montfort
- Issue: Raoul of Clermont; Guy I of Clermont and more
- House: House of Clermont-en-Beauvaisis also House of Creil also House of Clermont-Nesle
- Father: Raoul I of Clermont-Nesle
- Mother: Gertrude of Nesle

Simon II of Clermont-Nesle (c. 1210–1285/86) was Seigneur (Lord) of Ailly, Maulette and Nesle (in Picardy)

== Biography ==
Simon was the eldest son Raoul I of Clermont-Nesle, Seigneur of Ailly, Maulette, and Gertrude of Nesle. He was a counsellor of King Louis IX of France, especially in areas of justice. Jointly with Matthew of Vendôme, Simon was the regent of the kingdom in 1270–71 when Louis and his son Philip were away on the Eighth Crusade, using the title "lieutenant". In the process of canonisation of king Louis in 1283, he was one of those bearing witness.

Simon was also a tutor of the children of the king, appointed by Philip III.

Simon is accounted of the foundation of Hôtel de Nesle, to accommodate nobility in Paris, instead of their first Hôtel de Nesle, that was ceded to King Louis IX, and the construction was enabled through the prominent positions of his sons Raoul and Guy, and their wealth. The hotel was connected to Tour de Nesle, and eventually sold to King Philip IV of France in 1314.

== Marriage and issue ==
In 1242 Simon married Adele of Montfort, daughter of Amaury de Montfort, Count of Montfort-l'Amaury and Constable of France. Their children were:

- Raoul II/III of Clermont (c. 1245–1302), Seigneur of Nesle, Viscount of Châteaudun, Grand Chamberlain of France and Constable of France. He fought in the Franco-Flemish War (1297–1305) and was killed in the Battle of the Golden Spurs.
- Simon II of Clermont-Nesle (d. 22 December 1312 ?), bishop of Noyon and bishop-count of Beauvais (1301–c. 1312). He was one of few bishops that supported King Philip IV of France against Pope Boniface VIII.
- Amaury, a cleric
- Guy I of Clermont, Seigneur of Breteuil, Ailly and Maulette, appointed to Marshal of France, fighting in the Franco-Flemish War (1297–1305) and was killed in the Battle of the Golden Spurs.
- Elizabeth

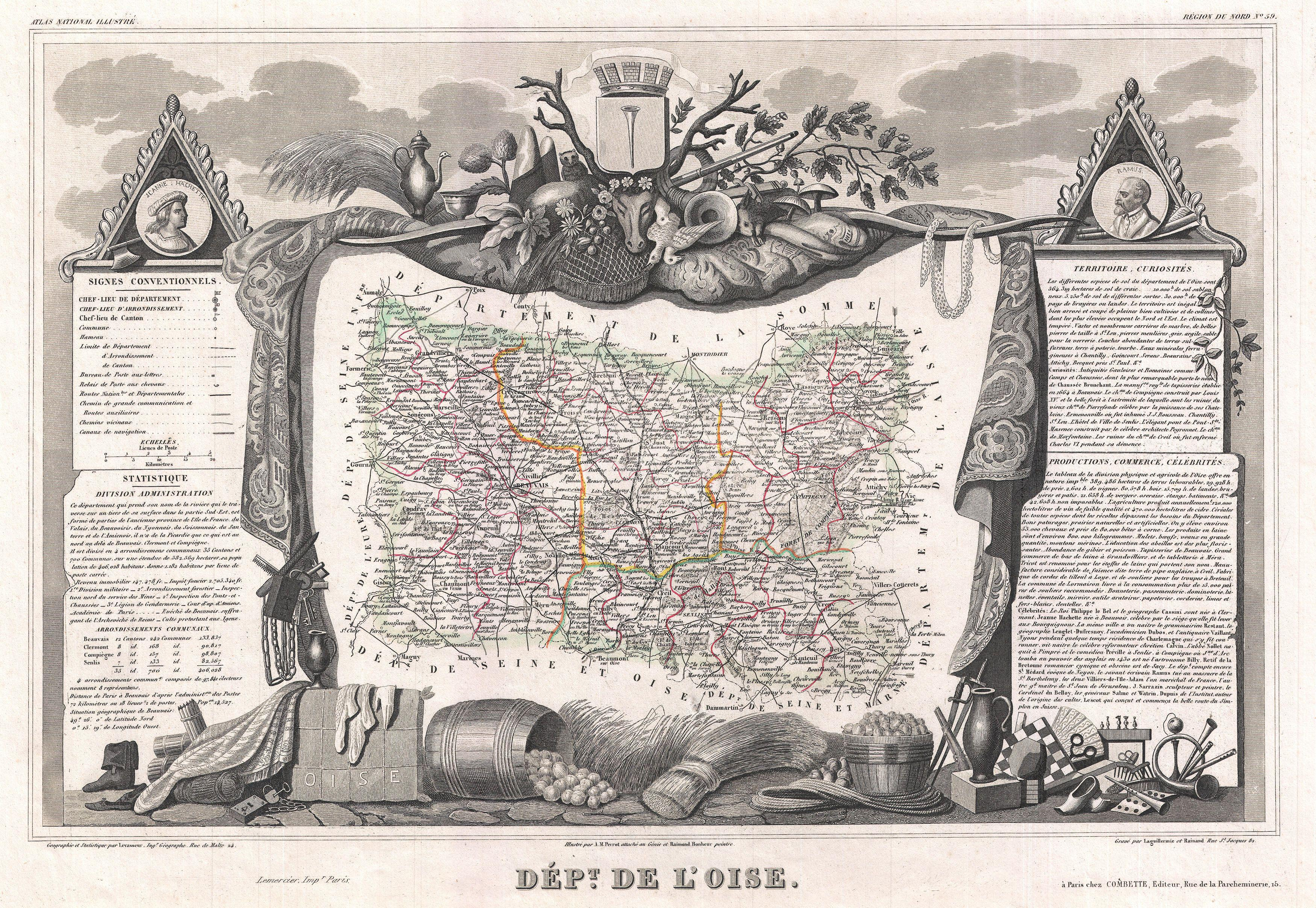
Map of Oise and other departments of Picardy, with most of the mentioned Seigneuries marked (from 1852).

== See also ==
- List of counts of Soissons
- List of counts of Clermont-en-Beauvaisis

== Sources ==
- Griffiths, Quentin (1997). "Royal Counselors and Trouvères in the Houses of Nesle and Soissons". Medieval Prosopography. 18. Board of Trustees of Western Michigan University through its Medieval Institute Publications: 123–137.
- Jordan, William Chester (2012). "Simon de Nesle, Aristocrat". Men at the Center: Redemptive Governance Under Louis IX. Budapest-New York: Central European University Press. pp. 71–99. ISBN 978-6155225123.
- Pipon, Brigitte (1996). Le chartrier de l'Abbaye-aux-Bois (1202–1341), étude et édition (in French). Ecole des chartes.
- Verbruggen, J. F. (2002). The Battle of the Golden Spurs (Courtrai, 11 July 1302): A Contribution to the History of Flanders' War of Liberation, 1297–1305. The Boydell Press.

Simon II of Clermont House of Clermont-en-Beauvaisis Born: c. 1216 Died: 1286
Regnal titles
Preceded by Raoul I jure uxoris or Jean II	Seigneur of Nesle; 1226?–1286	Succeeded by Raoul II
Preceded by Raoul I	Seigneur of Ailly and Maulette; 1226–1286	Succeeded by Guy I
Preceded by Amicie	Seigneur of Breteuil ? see note above c. 1226?–1286	Succeeded by Guy I ?
