= Raoul of Clermont =

Raoul of Clermont or Ralph of Clermont is the name of:

- Raoul I of Clermont (died 1191), French nobleman, and Count of Clermont-en-Beauvaisis from 1161 until his death
- Raoul II of Clermont (c. 1245–1302), Seigneur of Nesle in Picardy, Viscount of Châteaudun, Grand Chamberlain of France and Constable of France
