= Etienne de Cambaceres =

French politician and landowner

Étienne de Cambacérès

Member of the Corps législatif for Aisne
- In office 29 February 1852 – 29 May 1857

Member of the National Legislative Assembly for Aisne
- In office 13 May 1849 – 2 December 1851

Member of the Chamber of Deputies for Aisne
- In office 9 July 1842 – 24 February 1848

Mayor of Montgobert
- In office 1868–1878

Personal details
- Born: Étienne Armand Napoléon de Cambacérès; 5 December 1804 Boulogne-sur-Mer, France
- Died: 20 December 1878 (aged 74) Paris, France
- Spouse: Adèle Napoléone Davout d'Auerstaedt
- Children: Louis de Cambacérès
- Relatives: Jean-Jacques-Régis de Cambacérès (uncle)
- Occupation: Politician, landowner

Étienne Armand Napoléon de Cambacérès, Count of Cambacérès (5 December 1804 – 20 December 1878), was a French politician and landowner. He represented the department of Aisne in the Chamber of Deputies during the July Monarchy, in the National Legislative Assembly during the Second Republic, and subsequently in the Corps législatif of the Second French Empire.

Initially associated with the parliamentary opposition under Louis Philippe I, Cambacérès later supported Louis-Napoléon Bonaparte and sat with the dynastic majority during the early years of the Second Empire.

== Early life and family ==
Cambacérès was born on 5 December 1804 in Boulogne-sur-Mer. He belonged to the Cambacérès family, a family closely associated with the political and administrative elite of Napoleonic France. His father was General Jean-Pierre-Hugues de Cambacérès, Baron of the Empire, and his elder brother, Marie Jean Pierre Hubert de Cambacérès, later became Duke of Cambacérès, a peer of France and senator of the Second Empire. His uncle was Jean-Jacques-Régis de Cambacérès, Archchancellor of the French Empire and one of the principal political figures of the Napoleonic period.

On 14 March 1827, he married Adèle Napoléone Davout d'Auerstaedt (1807–1885), daughter of Marshal Louis-Nicolas Davout, Duke of Auerstaedt and Prince of Eckmühl. Their children included Louis de Cambacérès, who also became a deputy for Aisne.

In 1831, Marshal Davout's widow transferred the estate of Montgobert to Cambacérès, the value of the property forming part of his wife's dowry. Cambacérès subsequently became closely associated with Montgobert and the surrounding region.

== Political career ==
=== July Monarchy ===
Under the July Monarchy, Cambacérès belonged to the Bonapartist circles opposed to the government of Louis Philippe. His political position differed from that of his elder brother, who sat with the dynastic majority in the Chamber of Peers.

On 9 July 1842, Cambacérès was elected to the Chamber of Deputies for the third electoral college of Aisne, centred on Saint-Quentin. He defeated the government-supported incumbent Benoît Fould, receiving 220 votes out of 418 cast, against Fould's 193. In the Chamber he sat with the Left and consistently voted with the opposition.

He was re-elected on 1 August 1846 with 302 votes out of 477 cast, against 161 for Fould. During the final years of the July Monarchy, Cambacérès associated himself with the reform movement. At a reform banquet in Saint-Quentin he spoke in favour of representative government, and he supported the attempt to impeach the ministry of François Guizot.

=== Second Republic ===
Cambacérès was not a member of the Constituent Assembly elected in 1848. He returned to parliament on 13 May 1849, when he was elected as one of Aisne's representatives to the National Legislative Assembly. He received 62,287 votes and placed fifth among the twelve successful candidates in the department.

The National Assembly's historical database classifies him as a Bonapartist during this legislature. He initially adopted a relatively reserved position and supported the government of Odilon Barrot, before increasingly backing President Louis-Napoléon Bonaparte.

Following the coup d'état of 2 December 1851, Cambacérès was appointed to the consultative commission established by Louis-Napoléon.

=== Second Empire ===
Cambacérès was elected to the newly created Corps législatif on 29 February 1852 as a deputy for Aisne, receiving 17,810 votes out of 18,542 cast. During this legislature he sat with the dynastic majority supporting the imperial government.

He remained a member of the Corps législatif until May 1857. He then withdrew from national parliamentary politics, and his son Louis de Cambacérès subsequently represented Aisne.

== Later life ==
After leaving the Corps législatif, Cambacérès largely withdrew from national political life. He returned to public office in 1868, becoming mayor of Montgobert, where he succeeded his son.

Cambacérès was an Officer of the Legion of Honour.

He died in Paris on 20 December 1878 at the age of 74. He was buried in the Père Lachaise Cemetery.

== See also ==
- Jean-Jacques-Régis de Cambacérès
- Louis-Nicolas Davout
- Montgobert
