= Pulcelina of Blois =

French Jewish moneylender (died 1171)

Pulcelina of Blois (died 1171) was a Jewish woman, mistress and/or moneylender to the count Theobald V of Blois. Pulcelina was also a victim of antisemitic hatred.

According to the chronicle, Pulcelina was a Jewish woman with great influence over Theobald V, which created envy among the local elite as well as the countess, Alix of France. The chronicle claims that she was the mistress of Theobald V, but she may have been only his moneylender, having had influence over him on that account, rather than as his lover.

In 1171, a Jew of the local Blois community was accused of blood libel by the servant of a local nobleman, who used the accusation to go against Pulcelina. Theobald V had the Blois Jews imprisoned, and when Pulcelina attempted to use her influence to free them, she and her two daughters, as well as 31 other Jews of Blois, were burned alive. The massacre was historically commemorated by a fast day on the Twentieth of Sivan.
