= Abbecourt =

Abbecourt may refer to:

- Abbecourt, Oise, a commune in the department of Oise, France
- Abbécourt, a commune in the department of Aisne, France
