= Ralph I of Clermont =

French nobleman

Raoul I the Red of Clermont (before 1140 — killed 15 October 1191) was a French nobleman, and Count of Clermont-en-Beauvaisis from 1161 until his death. He was the eldest son of Renaud II, Count of Clermont-en-Beauvaisis, and his second wife (Clemencia de Bar?) and thus a younger half-brother of Margaret of Clermont.

He was Constable of France from 1174 under Phillip II, King of France. During the Jacquerie of 1181, he followed the orders of the regent and led the soldiers to secure the abbey of Saint-Leu. He accompanied Phillip in the Third Crusade and died during the Siege of Acre (1189–91).

Raoul married Alix de Breteuil (d. 1196), daughter of Valerian III, Seigneur de Breteuil, and his wife Haldeburge, lady of Tartigny. Raoul and Alix had:

- Catherine of Clermont (d. 1223), married in 1184 to Louis de Blois, Count of Blois and Chartres.
- Aelis (d. before 1182)
- Mathilde, married to William I, Seigneur of Vierzon
- Philippe de Clermont (d. between 1182 and 1192).

Upon his death, his son-in-law Louis became Count of Clermont-en-Beauvaisis.

== Sources ==
- Baldwin, John W. (1986). The Government of Philip Augustus: Foundations of French Royal Power in the. University of California Press.
- Dyggve, Holger Petersen (1935). "Personnages historiques figurant dans la poésie lyrique française des XII e et XIII e siècles. III: Les dames du »Tournoiement» de Huon d'Oisi". Neuphilologische Mitteilungen. 36 (2).
- Power, Daniel (2004). The Norman Frontier in the Twelfth and Early Thirteenth Centuries. Cambridge University Press.
- Wright, Nicholas (1998). Knights and Peasants: The Hundred Years War in the French Countryside. The Boydell Press.
