= Ubaldo Lanfranchi =

Italian Catholic archbishop

Ubaldo Lanfranchi (died 19 June 1207) was an Italian Catholic archbishop.

A member of the noble Lanfranchi family, he was consecrated archbishop of Pisa on 11 April 1176. The primacy of the Pisan church extended to the ecclesiastical provinces of Torres, Cagliari and Arborea. On 21 March 1198 Innocent III confirmed his primacy over the Sardinian dioceses, traditionally linked to his seat since the time of Pope Urban II.

In 1189 he participated in the Third Crusade, as papal legate accompanied by William I of Cagliari, reaching the Holy Land with 52 ships and sided with Guy of Lusignan, only to take the side of his rival Conrad of Montferrat; in the convulsive phases of the siege of Acre, he sanctioned the divorce between Humphrey IV of Toron and Isabella I of Jerusalem, so that she could marry Conrad.

In the last three years of his life, however, Ubaldo entered into conflict with the Holy See due to some disputes over canon law in Sardinia, particularly in the Judicate of Logudoro. He died in 1207, probably on 19 June.

== Legend ==
According to popular legend, it was he who returned from the siege of Acre with the galleys laden with the land of Golgotha. In 1203, this "holy land" was spread on the ground where the Pisan monumental Camposanto arose.

== Sources ==
- Bodner, Neta B. (2015). "Earth from Jerusalem in the Pisan Camposanto". In Bartal, Renana; Vorholt, Hanna (eds.). Between Jerusalem and Europe: Essays in Honour of Bianca Kühnel. Brill.
- McDougall, Sara (2017). Royal Bastards: The Birth of Illegitimacy, 800-1230. Oxford University Press.
- Queller, Donald E.; Madden, Thomas F. (1997). The Fourth Crusade: The Conquest of Constantinople. University of Pennsylvania Press.
