= Clemence, Viscountess of Châteaudun =

Clemence (died 1259) was Viscountess of Châteaudun and Dame de Mondoubleau in 1250-1259, daughter of Geoffrey VI, Viscount of Châteaudun, and Clemence de Roches, widow of Theobald VI, Count of Blois.

Clemence inherited the title of Viscountess of Châteaudun after the death of her father. She married Robert de Dreux, Seigneur de Beau, son of Robert III, Count of Dreux, great-grandson of Louis VI of France. Clemence and Robert had two children:

- Alix de Dreux (d. before 1296), who also held the title of Viscountess of Châteaudun. Alix married Raoul II of Clermont, Grand Chamberlain of France and Constable of France.
- Clemence de Dreux (d. 1300). Clemence first married Gauthier de Nemours, Seigneur d’Aschères, son of Philippe II, Seigneur de Nemours, and Isabelle de la Haye-Passavant. They had daughters named Blanche and Mathilde who both married sons of Renaud de Pressigny. Clemence’s second husband was Jean des Barres, Seigneur de Champrond, son of Pierre de Barres, Seigneur de Chaumont-sur-Yonne, and Alix de Saint-Vrain.

While Clemence’s husband, daughter and granddaughter carried the title of Châteaudun, she was the last of the dynasty of the House of Châteaudun.

== Sources ==
- Settipani, Christian, Les vicomtes de Châteaudun et leurs alliés, dans Onomastique et Parenté dans l'Occident médiéval, Oxford, Linacre, Unit for Prosopographical Research, 2000
- Europäische Stammtafeln, Vol. III, Les Vicomtes de Châteaudun
