= Nesle =

- Commune
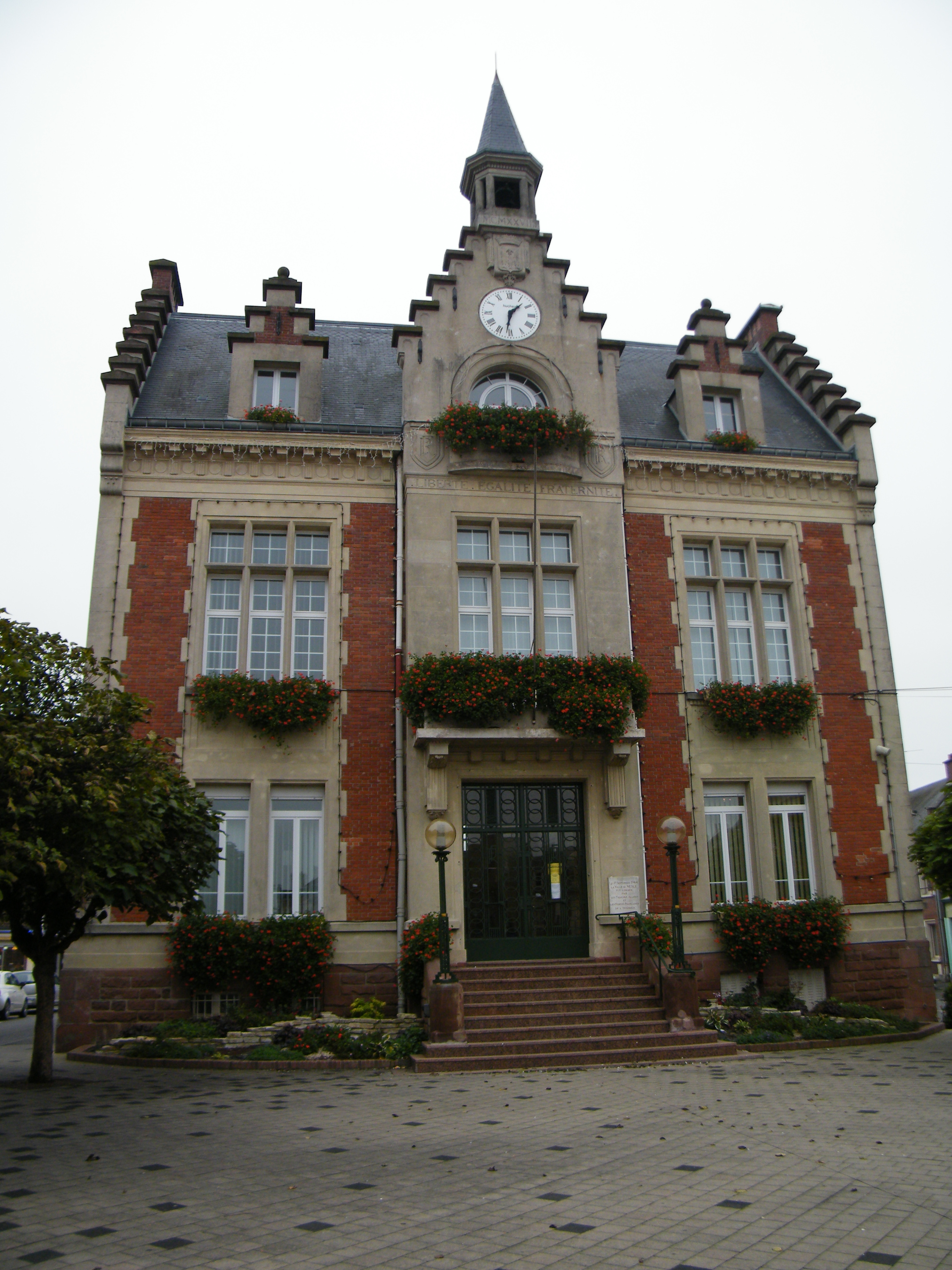
- The town hall in Nesle

- Coat of arms
- Location of Nesle
- Location within France Location within Hauts-de-France
- Coordinates: 49°45′31″N 2°54′38″E
- Country: France
- Region: Hauts-de-France
- Department: Somme
- Arrondissement: Péronne
- Canton: Ham
- Intercommunality: CC Est de la Somme

Government
  - Mayor (2020–2026): Frédéric Demule
- Area^{1}: 7.72 km^{2} (2.98 sq mi)
- Elevation: 79 m (259 ft)
- Highest elevation: 82 m (269 ft)
- Lowest elevation: 57 m (187 ft)
- Population (2023): 2,284
  - Density: 296/km^{2} (766/sq mi)
- Time zone: UTC+01:00 (CET)
  - Summer (DST): UTC+02:00 (CEST)
- INSEE/Postal code: 80585 /80190
- ^{1} French Land Register data, which excludes lakes, ponds, glaciers > 1 km^{2} (0.386 sq mi or 247 acres) and river estuaries.

Nesle (French pronunciation: [nɛl]) is a commune in the Somme department in Hauts-de-France in northern France.

== Geography ==
Nesle is situated at the junction of the D930 and D337 roads, some 16 miles (26 km) southwest of Saint-Quentin. The Ingon, a small stream, passes through the commune. Nesle (Somme) station has rail connections to Amiens and Laon.

== Population ==
Historical population
Year	Pop.	±% p.a.
1968	2,483	—
1975	2,811	+1.79%
1982	2,643	−0.88%
1990	2,642	−0.00%
1999	2,451	−0.83%
2007	2,493	+0.21%
2012	2,411	−0.67%
2017	2,339	−0.60%
2023	2,284	−0.40%
Source: INSEE

== Personalities ==
- Amaury de Nesle (c.1180), a Patriarch of Jerusalem.
- Blondel de Nesle (c. 1155–1202), French trouvère.
- Simon II of Clermont-Nesle (bishop) (d.c. 1313), Bishop of Noyon and Beauvais.

== Lordship ==
Nesle gave its name to an old feudal family. This family became extinct at the beginning of the 13th century, and the heiress brought the lordship to the family of Clermont in the Beauvaisis. One of the first lords was Raoul I, Seigneur of Nesle Rudolf II van Nesle (d.a. 1125).

Simon II of Clermont, Seigneur of Nesle through his mother Gertrude, was regent of the kingdom of France during the second crusade of Saint Louis. Raoul II/III of Clermont, constable of France, and Guy I and Guy II (d. 1352) of Clermont, both marshals of France, were members of the family. The brothers Raoul and Guy I were both notable casualties of the Battle of the Golden Spurs 1302, a French military disaster in the County of Flanders in the Franco-Flemish War (1297–1305).

The seigneurie (lordship) of Nesle was elevated to a countship for Charles de Sainte-Maure in 1467 and into a marquisate for Louis de Sainte-Maure in 1546. It was acquired in 1666 by Louis Charles de Mailly. His grandson, Louis de Mailly, had five daughters, of whom four (the Countess of Mailly, the Duchess of Lauragais, the Countess of Vintimille, and the Marquise de la Tournelle, afterwards the Duchess of Châteauroux) were successively, or simultaneously, mistresses of Louis XV.

== See also ==
- Communes of the Somme department
