= Theobald V =

Theobald V may refer to:

- Theobald V, Count of Blois (1130–1191)
- Theobald V of Champagne (c. 1239 – 1270)
