= Maulette =

- Commune
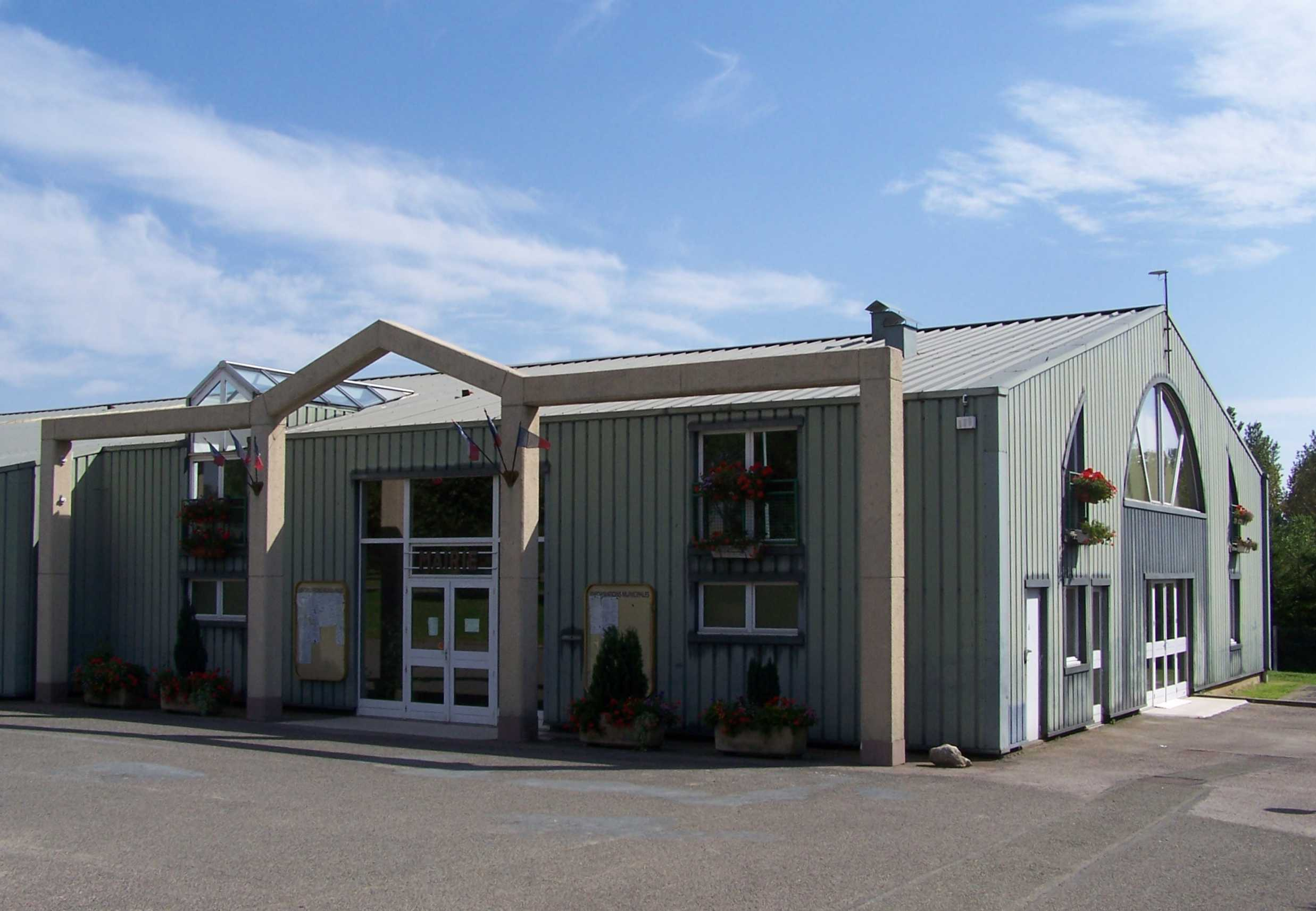
- Town hall

- Coat of arms
- Location of Maulette
- Location within France Location within Île-de-France (region)
- Coordinates: 48°47′34″N 1°37′15″E
- Country: France
- Region: Île-de-France
- Department: Yvelines
- Arrondissement: Mantes-la-Jolie
- Canton: Bonnières-sur-Seine
- Intercommunality: Pays houdanais

Government
  - Mayor (2023–2026): Stéphane Gornes
- Area^{1}: 7.89 km^{2} (3.05 sq mi)
- Elevation: 97 m (318 ft)
- Highest elevation: 129 m (423 ft)
- Lowest elevation: 93 m (305 ft)
- Population (2023): 1,088
  - Density: 138/km^{2} (357/sq mi)
- Time zone: UTC+01:00 (CET)
  - Summer (DST): UTC+02:00 (CEST)
- INSEE/Postal code: 78381 /78550
- ^{1} French Land Register data, which excludes lakes, ponds, glaciers > 1 km^{2} (0.386 sq mi or 247 acres) and river estuaries.

Maulette (French pronunciation: [molɛt]) is a commune within the Yvelines department in Île-de-France region, France.

== See also ==
- Communes of the Yvelines department
