= Matilda of Amboise =

French nobility (c. 1200 – 1256)

Matilda of Amboise (Mahaut, Mathilde d'Amboise; c. 1200 ‒ 12 May 1256) was the Countess of Chartres 1248-1256. She was the daughter of Sulpice III of Amboise and Isabella of Blois.

She married Richard II, Vicomte de Beaumont, but it seems they were childless. Richard died on 17 September 1242. In 1232 Matilda and Richard gave land to the nuns of Lieu. Matilda later married Jean II de Nesle. She was also childless with him.

On Matilda’s death, her cousin John I, Count of Blois reunited Chartres with Blois.

== Sources ==
- Berman, Constance Hoffman (2009). "Noble Women's Power as Reflected in the Foundations of Cistercian Houses for Nuns in Thirteenth-Century Northern France: Port-Royal, les Clairets, Moncey, Lieu and Eau-lez-Chartres". In Katherine Smith; Scott Wells (eds.). Negotiating Community and Difference in Medieval Europe: Gender, Power, Patronage and the Authority of Religion in Latin Christendom. Brill. pp. 137–149.
- Smith, Katherine Allen; Wells, Scott, eds. (2009). Negotiating community and difference in medieval Europe: gender, power, patronage, and the authority of religion in Latin Christendom. Brill.144
