= Raoul II of Clermont =

Raoul II of Clermont Raoul II de Clermont
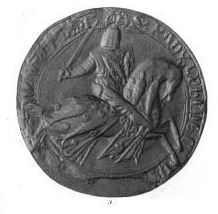

Constable of France
- Reign: 1285–1302

Grand Chamberlain of France
- Reign: 1283–1302

Seigneur of Nesle
- Reign: 1286–1302

Viscount of Châteaudun jure uxoris
- Reign: c. 1268–1302
- Born: c. 1245
- Died: 1302; Kortrijk
- Spouse: Alix of Dreux; Isabelle of Hainault
- Issue: Alix; Isabelle; Beatrix
- House: House of Clermont-en-Beauvaisis also House of Creil also House of Clermont-Nesle
- Father: Simon II of Clermont
- Mother: Adele of Montfort

Coat of arms used by Raoul II of Clermont. It is a combination of Clermont with the two barbels of Bar, overall a silver (argent) three-point label added for difference.

Raoul II/III of Clermont-Nesle (c. 1245 – Kortrijk, 11 July 1302) was Seigneur (Lord) of Nesle in Picardy (de), Viscount of Châteaudun (de), Grand Chamberlain of France and Constable of France.

== Biography ==
Raoul was the eldest son of Simon II of Clermont (c. 1216 – 1286) by Adele ("Alix") of Montfort (d. 1279), daughter of Amaury VI of Montfort. (Note: His father had a brother called Raoul (d. a. 1243), sometimes numbered II, causing confusion about the parentage of Raoul's children, as either somehow might come into question. Having Raoul's uncle as No. II and his nephew as Raoul IV, makes himself No. III. There are other issues with the genealogy, as discussed in the article about Simon II)

Raoul de Clermont was one of the most important generals of King Louis IX of France. He participated in most campaigns of the King, including the Eighth Crusade against Tunis. appointed Constable of France in 1285 (probably), he fought in the Aragonese Crusade and in the Franco-Flemish War (1297–1305) against the County of Flanders, with Count Guy of Dampierre, his in-law. The governor of Flanders, Jacques de Châtillon, put in place by the French king was also Raoul's in-law. The French King Philip "the fair" (1268–1314) sent him with his brother Guy I of Clermont, Marshal of France, to attack the enemy at the Siege of Lille (1297), where they were victorious and took a large number of prisoners. In 1302, together with his brother Guy, he fought under Robert II, Count of Artois against the Flemish in the Battle of the Golden Spurs at Kortrijk, and the French army was utterly defeated, all three killed and the Flemish regained independence.

His daughter Alix succeeded in Châteaudun but record about succession in Nesle is not present.

== Marriage and issue ==
Raoul married firstly in c.1268 Alix (Yolande) of Dreux (c. 1255 – c. 1293), Viscountess of Châteaudun, daughter of Robert of Dreux (1217–c. 1264), and Clemence, Viscountess of Châteaudun. Raoul and Alix had three daughters:

- Alix (c. 1275 – c. 1330), Viscountess of Châteaudun, Lady of Mondoubleau. Called Alix of Clermont, Nesle or Beaumont.
  - Alix married firstly 1286 to Guillaume IV of Flanders (fr) (1248–1311), Seigneur of Dendermonde, Crèvecoeur and Richebourg, son of Guy of Dampierre, Count of Flanders. They had six children:
    - Guillaume/William (c. 1290 – 1320), married to Marie of Vianden (1290–1344), daughter of Philip of Salm-Vianden, Herr of Rumpst, youngest son of Philip I, Count of Vianden.
    - Jeanne (c. 1290 – 1342), married to Gérard van Diest (de) (1275–1333), Châtelain (Burggraf) of Antwerp and Otto of Cuijk (de) (1270–1350).
    - Marie of Dampierre (c. 1290 – 1350), Viscountess of Châteaudun, married 1317 to Robert VII of Auvergne (fr) (1280 – c. 1326) and had seven known children, including Jean I (fr) (d. 1386), Count of Auvergne, Boulogne and Montfort.
    - Alice (c. 1295 – 1320)
    - Jean/John (c. 1295 – 1325) married 1315 to Béatrice, daughter of Jacques de Châtillon, governor of Flanders. They had five children.
    - Guy (c. 1290? – 1345), Seigneur of Richebourg, married after 1315 Marie of Enghien (de), daughter of Gerard of Enghien, Herr of Zottegem. Châtelain (Burggraf) of Gent (de). Secondly, in 1321 Guy married Béatrice of Putten (1300–1354), daughter of Nikolaas III/IV (nl) (d. 1311), Herr of Putten (de). They had one daughter.
  - Secondly, in 1312 Alix married John I of Chalon-Arlay, Sire of Salins (c. 1258–1315), and they had one daughter:
    - Catherine of Châlon (d.1355), married 1342 to Thiébaud (Thibaut) V Seigneur (lord) of Neuchâtel-Burgundy (fr) (c. 1317–1366), being a widower, and bore four children.
- Isabelle (d. a. August 1324), Lady of Semblançay, married Hugues of l'Archévêque, Seigneur of Montfort-le-Rotrou (d. b. August 1324), son of Guillaume VI of l'Archévêque (fr) (d. 1315).
- Béatrix (d. b. 14 September 1320), married Aymer de Valence, 2nd Earl of Pembroke (c. 1275 – 1324), Seigneur of Montignac (House of Lusignan).

In January 1296 Raoul married secondly Isabelle of Hainaut (d. c. 1305), daughter of John II, Count of Holland and Philippa of Luxembourg. They had no recorded children. Some genealogists attribute Isabelle and Béatrix to this second marriage.

== Notes ==
Raoul II of Clermont House of Clermont-en-Beauvaisis Born: c. 1245 Died: 1302
Political offices
Preceded by Humbert II/VI of Beaujeu (fr)	Constable of France; 1285–1302	Succeeded by Gaucher V of Châtillon (fr)
Preceded by Pierre de La Broce until 1278	Grand Chamberlain of France; 1283–1302	Succeeded by Matthew IV of Montmorency possibly already earlier
French nobility
Preceded by Simon II	Seigneur of Nesle; 1286–1302	Succeeded by Alix of Clermont ?
Preceded by Alix of Dreux	Viscount of Châteaudun jure uxoris with Alix of Dreux c.1268–1302	Succeeded by Alix of Clermont
