= Ablancourt =

- Commune
- Location of Ablancourt
- Location within France Location within Grand Est
- Coordinates: 48°48′50″N 4°31′19″E
- Country: France
- Region: Grand Est
- Department: Marne
- Arrondissement: Vitry-le-François
- Canton: Vitry-le-François-Champagne et Der
- Intercommunality: Vitry, Champagne et Der

Government
  - Mayor (2020–2026): Loïc Nicouleaud
- Area^{1}: 7.07 km^{2} (2.73 sq mi)
- Elevation: 92 m (302 ft)
- Population (2023): 168
  - Density: 23.8/km^{2} (61.5/sq mi)
- Demonym(s): Blancourtiens, Blancourtiennes
- Time zone: UTC+01:00 (CET)
  - Summer (DST): UTC+02:00 (CEST)
- INSEE/Postal code: 51001 /51240
- ^{1} French Land Register data, which excludes lakes, ponds, glaciers > 1 km^{2} (0.386 sq mi or 247 acres) and river estuaries.

Ablancourt (French pronunciation: [ablɑ̃kuʁ]) is a commune in the Marne department in northeastern France.

== Population ==
Historical population

Year	Pop.	±% p.a.
1793	205	—
1821	240	+0.56%
1846	248	+0.13%
1872	243	−0.08%
1901	179	−1.05%
1926	133	−1.18%
1946	140	+0.26%
1962	100	−2.08%
1968	109	+1.45%

Year	Pop.	±% p.a.
1975	131	+2.66%
1982	139	+0.85%
1990	165	+2.17%
1999	172	+0.46%
2007	155	−1.29%
2012	150	−0.65%
2017	162	+1.55%
2023	168	+0.61%

Source: EHESS (1793-1999) and INSEE

== See also ==
- Communes of the Marne department
