= Alix of France =

Countess of Blois from 1164 to 1191

- Born: July/August 1150
- Died: 1197/98 (aged 46–48)
- Spouse: Theobald V, Count of Blois (m. 1164, died 1191)
- Issue more...: Louis I, Count of Blois; Margaret, Countess of Blois
- House: Capet
- Father: Louis VII of France
- Mother: Eleanor of Aquitaine

Alix of France (July/August 1150 – 1197/1198) was countess of Blois by marriage to Theobald V of Blois. She served as regent of Blois during Theobald's absence in 1190–1191, and during the minority of their son Louis from 1191 until 1197. She was the daughter of Eleanor of Aquitaine and Louis VII of France.

Her parents' second child and daughter, Alix was named after her aunt Petronilla of Aquitaine, who was known as "Alix". The birth of yet another daughter, rather than the desperately needed son, proved to be the final blow to Eleanor and Louis's marriage. Their union was annulled on 21 March 1152, when Alix was not yet two years old. Both Alix and her sister Marie retained their legitimacy, and custody of the girls was awarded to the king. Eleanor married Henry, Duke of Normandy, just eight weeks later on 18 May.

In 1164, at age 14, Alix married Theobald, who had previously attempted to abduct Alix's mother to force her into a marriage with him. Her sister Marie married Theobald's brother Henry I, Count of Champagne. Alix and Theobald had seven children:

1. Theobald (died 1187)
2. Louis I, Count of Blois
3. Henry (died 1185)
4. Philip (died 1202)
5. Margaret, Countess of Blois (d. aft. 1230), who married (1) Otto I, Count of Burgundy; (2) Gauthier II, Seigneur of Avesnes
6. Isabelle of Chartres
7. Alix, Abbess of Fontevrault

== Sources ==
- Henry Gardiner Adams, ed. (1857). "Alice" . A Cyclopaedia of Female Biography: 31. Wikidata Q115605821 – via Wikisource.
- Armstrong-Partida, Michelle (2005). "Mothers and Daughters as Lords: The Countesses of Blois and Chartres". Medieval Prosopography. 26: 77–107.
- Berman, Constance Hoffman (2018). The White Nuns: Cistercian Abbeys for Women in Medieval France. University of Pennsylvania Press.
- Kelly, Amy Ruth (1991). Eleanor of Aquitaine and the Four Kings. Harvard University Press.
- Livingstone, Amy (2010). Out of Love for My Kin: Aristocratic Family Life in the Lands of the Loire, 1000–1200. Cornell University Press.
