= Margaret of Blois =

French noblewoman (1164–1230)

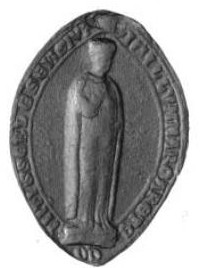
- Seal of Margaret of Blois
- Born: c. 1170
- Died: 12 July 1230 (aged 59–60); Besançon
- Noble family: House of Blois; House of Blois-Champagne; House of Blois-Chartres
- Spouses: Hugh of Oisy; Otto I, Count of Burgundy; Walter II of Avesnes
- Issue: Joanna I, Countess of Burgundy; Beatrice II, Countess of Burgundy; Mary, Countess of Blois
- Father: Theobald V, Count of Blois
- Mother: Alice of France

Margaret of Blois (French: Marguerite; died 1230) was suo jure Countess of Blois in France from 1218 to 1230. From 1190 to 1200, she was the countess consort of the County of Burgundy and then regent for her daughters from 1200 until 1208.

== Life ==
She was daughter of Theobald V of Blois and Alix of France.

Margaret married three times. Her first marriage was to Hugh of Oisy, Lord of Montmirail. Her second husband was Otto I, Count of Burgundy, with whom she had two daughters:

- Joanna I, Countess of Burgundy
- Beatrice II, Countess of Burgundy

Finally, she married Walter II of Avesnes, they had:

- Theobald, died young
- Mary, Countess of Blois

== Sources ==
- Bumke, Joachim (1991). Courtly Culture: Literature and Society in the High Middle Ages. Translated by Dunlap, Thomas. University of California Press. ISBN 9780520066342.
- Mariotte, Jean-Yves (1986). "Othon »Sans Terre«, comte palatin de Bourgogne et la fin des Staufen en Franche-Comté". Francia. 14: 83–102. doi:10.11588/fr.1986.0.52590.
- Platelle, Henri (2004). Présence de l'au-delà: une vision médiévale du monde (in French). Presses Universitaires du Septentrion.

Margaret of Blois House of Blois Born: c. 1170 Died: 12 July 1230
Preceded by Theobald VI	Countess of Blois; 1218–1230	Succeeded by Mary
