= Theobald V of Blois =

Count of Blois from 1151 to 1191

Theobald V
- Count of Blois jure uxoris Lord of Chateaurenault
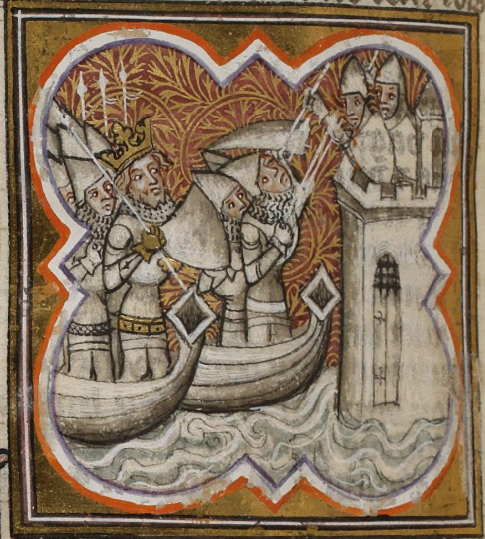
- Born: 1130
- Died: 20 January 1191 (aged 60–61); Acre
- Noble family: House of Blois; House of Blois-Champagne; House of Blois-Chartres (founder)
- Spouses: Sybil of Chateaurenault Alice of France (m. 1164)
- Issue more...: Louis I, Count of Blois; Margaret, Countess of Blois
- Father: Theobald II, Count of Champagne
- Mother: Matilda of Carinthia

Theobald V of Blois (1130 – 20 January 1191), also known as Theobald the Good (French: Thibaut le Bon), was Count of Blois from 1151 to 1191.

== Biography ==
Theobald was son of Theobald II of Champagne and Matilda of Carinthia. Although he was the second son, Theobald inherited Blois (including Chartres), while his elder brother, Henry got the more important county of Champagne.

Theobald first married Sybil of Chateaurenault, which made him jure uxoris Lord of Chateaurenault. Next, in 1164, he married Alix of France, daughter of Louis VII of France and his first wife Eleanor of Aquitaine.

According to medieval Jewish sources, in 1171 Theobald was responsible for orchestrating the first blood libel in continental Europe. His alleged Jewish mistress Pulcelina of Blois unsuccessfully attempted to prevent him. As a result of a church-sponsored trial, 30 or 31 members of the Jewish community were burned at the stake.

Theobald lived primarily in Chartres and had its city walls renovated. After joining his brother Henry and a number of other nobles in opposing the young king Philip II, he reconciled with the king and supported him on the Third Crusade. He arrived in the summer of 1190 in the Holy Land and died on 20 January 1191, during the Siege of Acre.

== Family ==
Theobald and Alix had seven children:

1. Theobald, d. young
2. Philip, d. young
3. Henry, d. young
4. Louis I of Blois (d. 1205)
5. Alix, Abbess of Fontevrault
6. Margaret, married Walter of Avesnes, later Countess of Blois
7. Isabella, married John II, lord of Oisy and Montreuil,

== Sources ==
- Baldwin, John W. (1991). The Government of Philip Augustus: Foundations of French Royal Power in the Middle Ages. University of California Press. ISBN 0520073916.
- Crosby, Everett U. (2013). The King's Bishops: The Politics of Patronage in England and Normandy, 1066-1216. Palgrave Macmillan.
- Hanley, Catherine (2022). Two Houses, Two Kingdoms: A History of France and England, 1100-1300. Yale University Press.
- Pollock, M.A. (2015). Scotland, England and France after the Loss of Normandy, 1204-1296. The Boydell Press.
- Taitz, Emily; Henry, Sondra; Tallan, Cheryl (2003). The JPS Guide to Jewish Women: 600 B.C.E.to 1900 C.E. Jewish Publication Society.
- Thompson, Kathleen (2002). Power and Border Lordship in Medieval France: The County of the Perche, 1000-1226. The Boydell Press.

Theobald V of Blois House of Blois Born: 1130 Died: 20 January 1191
Preceded by Theobald IV	Count of Blois; 1152–1191	Succeeded by Louis I
