= Abbecourt, Oise =

Abbecourt
- Commune
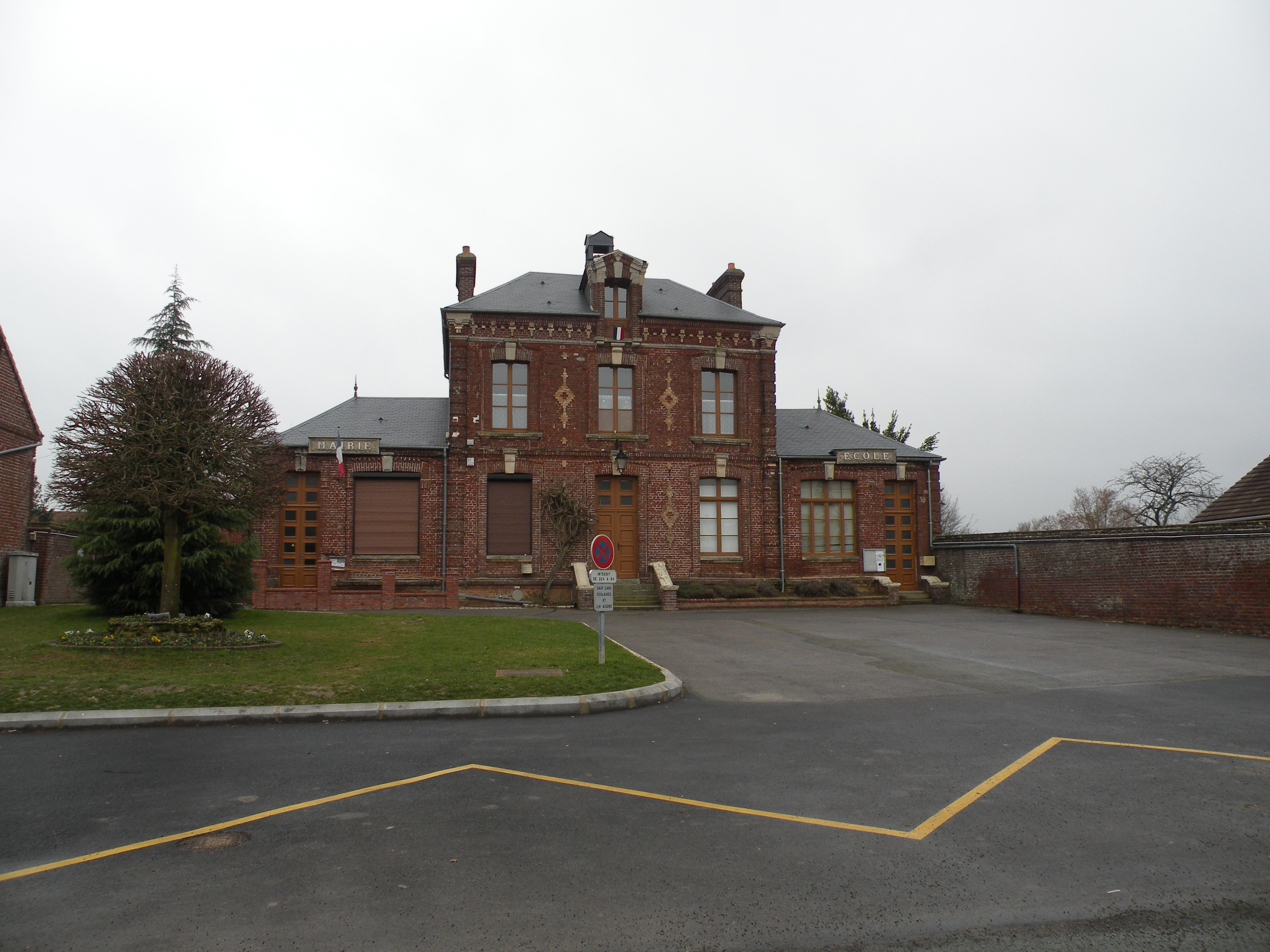
- Combined village hall and schoolhouse

- Coat of arms
- Location of Abbecourt
- Location within France Location within Hauts-de-France
- Coordinates: 49°21′23″N 2°09′34″E
- Country: France
- Region: Hauts-de-France
- Department: Oise
- Arrondissement: Beauvais
- Canton: Chaumont-en-Vexin
- Intercommunality: Thelloise

Government
  - Mayor (2020–2026): Jean-Jacques Anthéaume
- Area^{1}: 7.44 km^{2} (2.87 sq mi)
- Elevation: 116 m (381 ft)
- Highest elevation: 150 m (490 ft)
- Lowest elevation: 77 m (253 ft)
- Population (2023): 879
  - Density: 118/km^{2} (306/sq mi)
- Demonym(s): Abbecourtois, Abbecourtoises
- Time zone: UTC+01:00 (CET)
  - Summer (DST): UTC+02:00 (CEST)
- INSEE/Postal code: 60002 /60430
- ^{1} French Land Register data, which excludes lakes, ponds, glaciers > 1 km^{2} (0.386 sq mi or 247 acres) and river estuaries.

Abbecourt (French pronunciation: [abkuʁ]) is a commune in the Oise department in northern France.

== Population ==
Historical population

Year	Pop.	±% p.a.
1793	350	—
1821	388	+0.37%
1846	453	+0.62%
1872	482	+0.24%
1901	438	−0.33%
1926	364	−0.74%
1946	407	+0.56%
1962	380	−0.43%
1968	409	+1.23%

Year	Pop.	±% p.a.
1975	441	+1.08%
1982	522	+2.44%
1990	678	+3.32%
1999	670	−0.13%
2007	760	+1.59%
2012	769	+0.24%
2017	787	+0.46%
2023	879	+1.86%

Source: EHESS and INSEE

== Heraldry ==
Arms of Abbecourt	The arms of the commune of Abbecourt are blazoned : Argent, a fess gules between 6 marlets sable.

== See also ==
- Communes of the Oise department
