= Montgobert =

- Commune
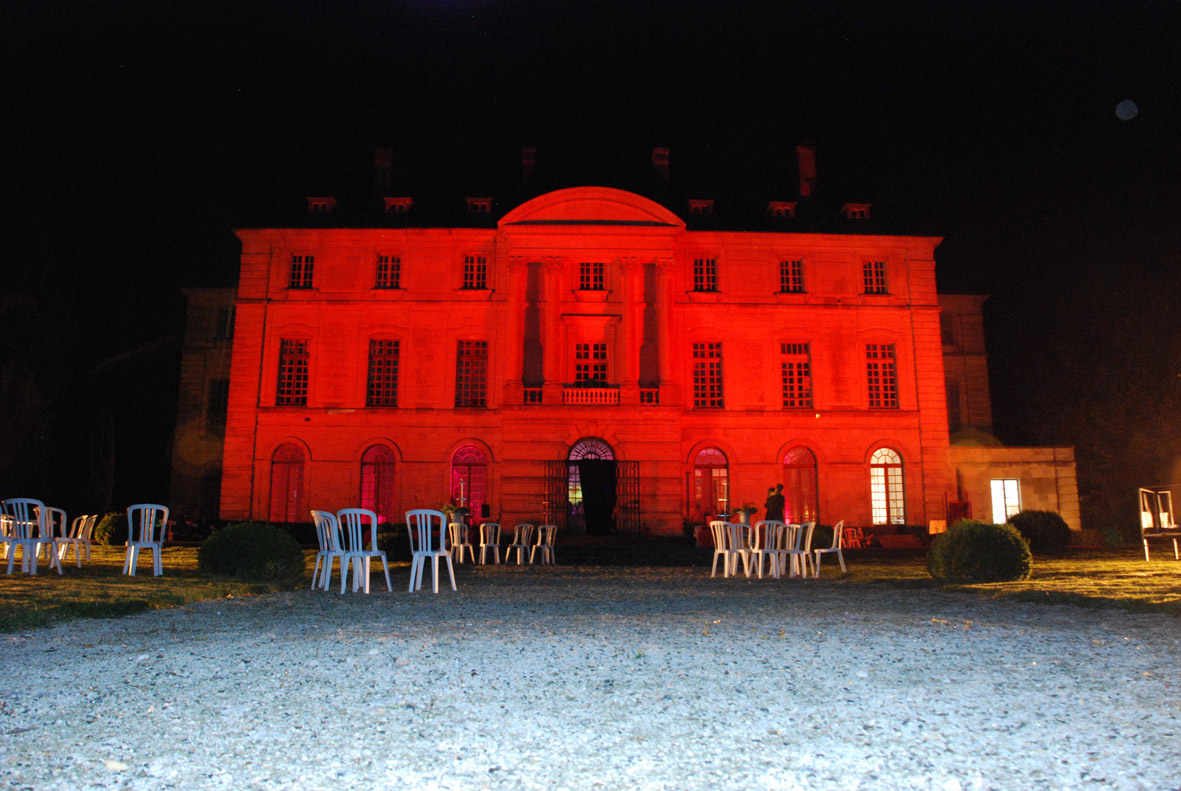
- Chateau
- Location of Montgobert
- Location within France Location within Hauts-de-France
- Coordinates: 49°18′28″N 3°08′57″E
- Country: France
- Region: Hauts-de-France
- Department: Aisne
- Arrondissement: Soissons
- Canton: Villers-Cotterêts

Government
  - Mayor (2026–32): Alexandre de Montesquiou
- Area^{1}: 11.18 km^{2} (4.32 sq mi)
- Elevation: 160 m (520 ft)
- Highest elevation: 162 m (531 ft)
- Lowest elevation: 70 m (230 ft)
- Population (2023): 200
  - Density: 18/km^{2} (46/sq mi)
- Time zone: UTC+01:00 (CET)
  - Summer (DST): UTC+02:00 (CEST)
- INSEE/Postal code: 02506 /02600
- ^{1} French Land Register data, which excludes lakes, ponds, glaciers > 1 km^{2} (0.386 sq mi or 247 acres) and river estuaries.

Montgobert (French pronunciation: [mɔ̃ɡɔbɛʁ]) is a commune in the Aisne department in Hauts-de-France in northern France. It is situated 9.7 km from Villers-Cotterêts, 15.3 km from Vic-sur-Aisne, 94 km from Paris, 113 km from Amiens and 180 km from Lille.

== History ==
=== Foundation and medieval period ===
According to local historical studies, Montgobert was founded in the middle of the 12th century by a Frankish landholder named Godbert, whose name gave rise to that of the settlement. Medieval documents mention the locality under forms including Mons-Gomberte and Mongombert.

The first known lord of Montgobert was named Jean, who participated in the campaigns of Philip II Augustus and the Battle of Bouvines in 1214. The seigneury subsequently passed through several noble families, including the families of Menou, Malortie, Barbenson and Joyeuse.

=== Château of Montgobert ===
In 1762, the estate was acquired by Antoine-Pierre Desplasses, a Parisian notary. In 1768, he demolished the older manor house and began construction of a new château in the architectural style of the period.

The château later became associated with Pauline Bonaparte, sister of Napoleon I and wife of General Charles Leclerc. The property is now used as a museum dedicated to woodworking tools and local history.

=== First World War ===
During the First World War, Montgobert was subjected to heavy bombardments and was partially destroyed. The village was occupied by German forces between May and July 1918. In recognition of the conduct of its inhabitants during the bombardments and occupation, Montgobert was cited in the order of the Army on 26 October 1920 and awarded the Croix de guerre.

== Sights ==
- Château de Montgobert

== Population ==
Historical population
Year	Pop.	±% p.a.
1968	155	—
1975	184	+2.48%
1982	197	+0.98%
1990	194	−0.19%
1999	185	−0.53%
2007	190	+0.33%
2012	204	+1.43%
2017	193	−1.10%
2023	200	+0.60%
Source: INSEE

== See also ==
- Communes of the Aisne department
