= Catherine of Clermont =

Catherine of Clermont (French: Catherine de Clermont; ? – 19/20 September 1212/1213) was the ruling Countess of Clermont-en-Beauvaisis in her own right in 1191-1213. She was also the Countess of Blois by marriage.

== Biography ==
Catherine was the eldest child of Raoul I, Count of Clermont-en-Beauvaisis and his wife, Countess Alix. Catherine’s brother Philippe died before Raoul, and Catherine became the Countess of Clermont-en-Beauvaisis after her father’s death.

The husband of Catherine was Louis I, Count of Blois, a grandson of the King of France. Catherine bore three children to her husband; one of them was Theobald VI, Count of Blois.

== Sources ==
- Peter of Blois (1993). Revell, Elizabeth (ed.). The Later Letters of Peter of Blois. Oxford University Press.
- Power, Daniel (2004). The Norman Frontier in the Twelfth and Early Thirteenth Centuries. Cambridge University Press.
- Williams, Jane Welch (1993). Bread, Wine, and Money: The Windows of the Trades at Chartres Cathedral. University of Chicago Press.
