= Counts of Clermont-en-Beauvaisis =

Noble family of France

The counts of Clermont-en-Beauvaisis first appeared in the early 11th century. Their principal town was Clermont, now in the Oise department but then within the ancient county of Beauvaisis in the province of Île-de-France.

Following the death of the childless Theobald VI of Blois, son of Catherine of Clermont, the daughter of Raoul I, Count of Clermont-en-Beauvaisis, King Philip II of France bought the county from his heirs in 1218 and added it to the French crown. It was first granted as an appanage in 1218 to Philip Hurepel; with the extinction of his line, it was granted in 1268 to the House of Bourbon, and was confiscated with the Duchy of Bourbon in 1527.

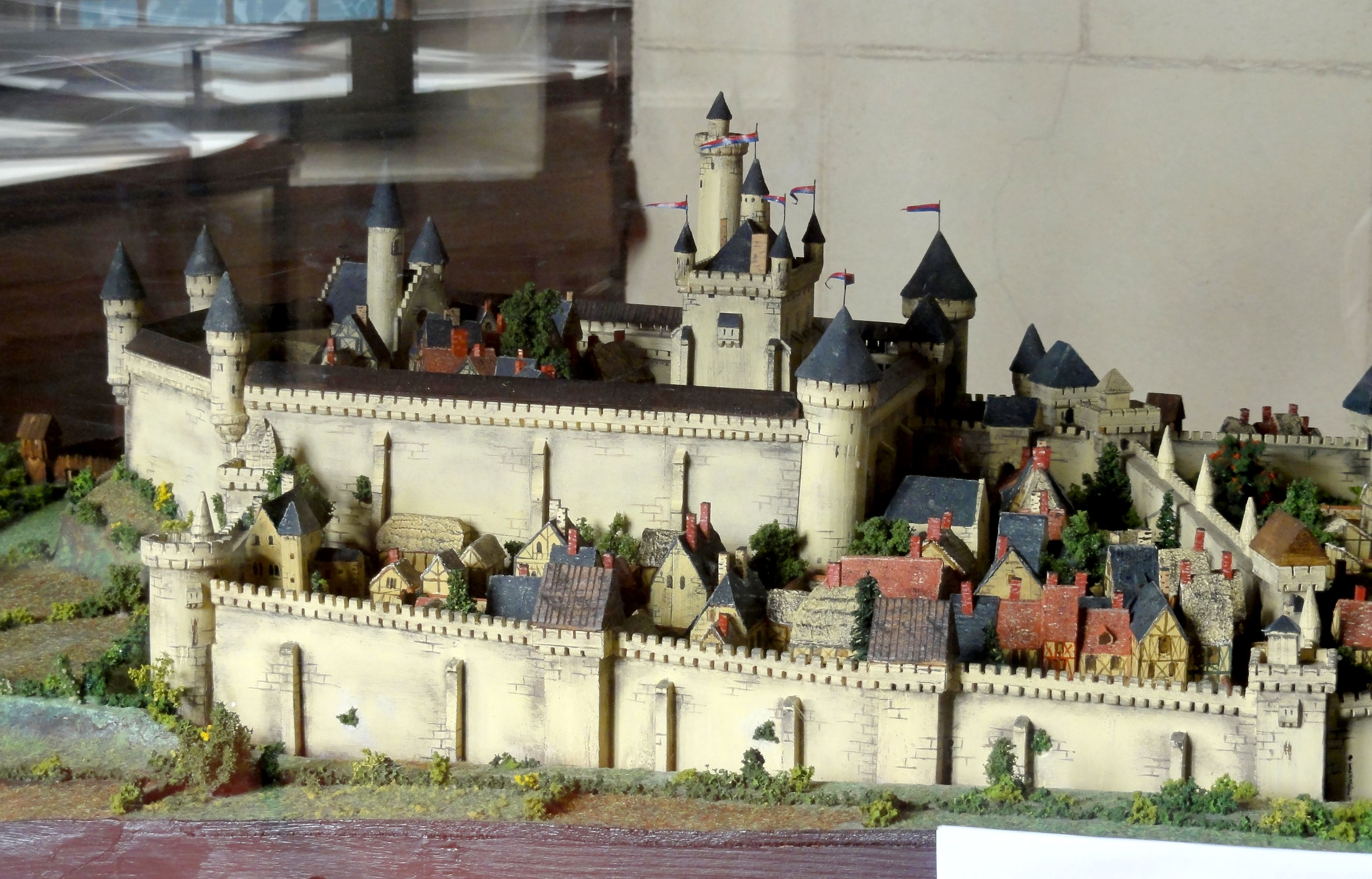
Model of Clermont Castle at the end of the 14th century.

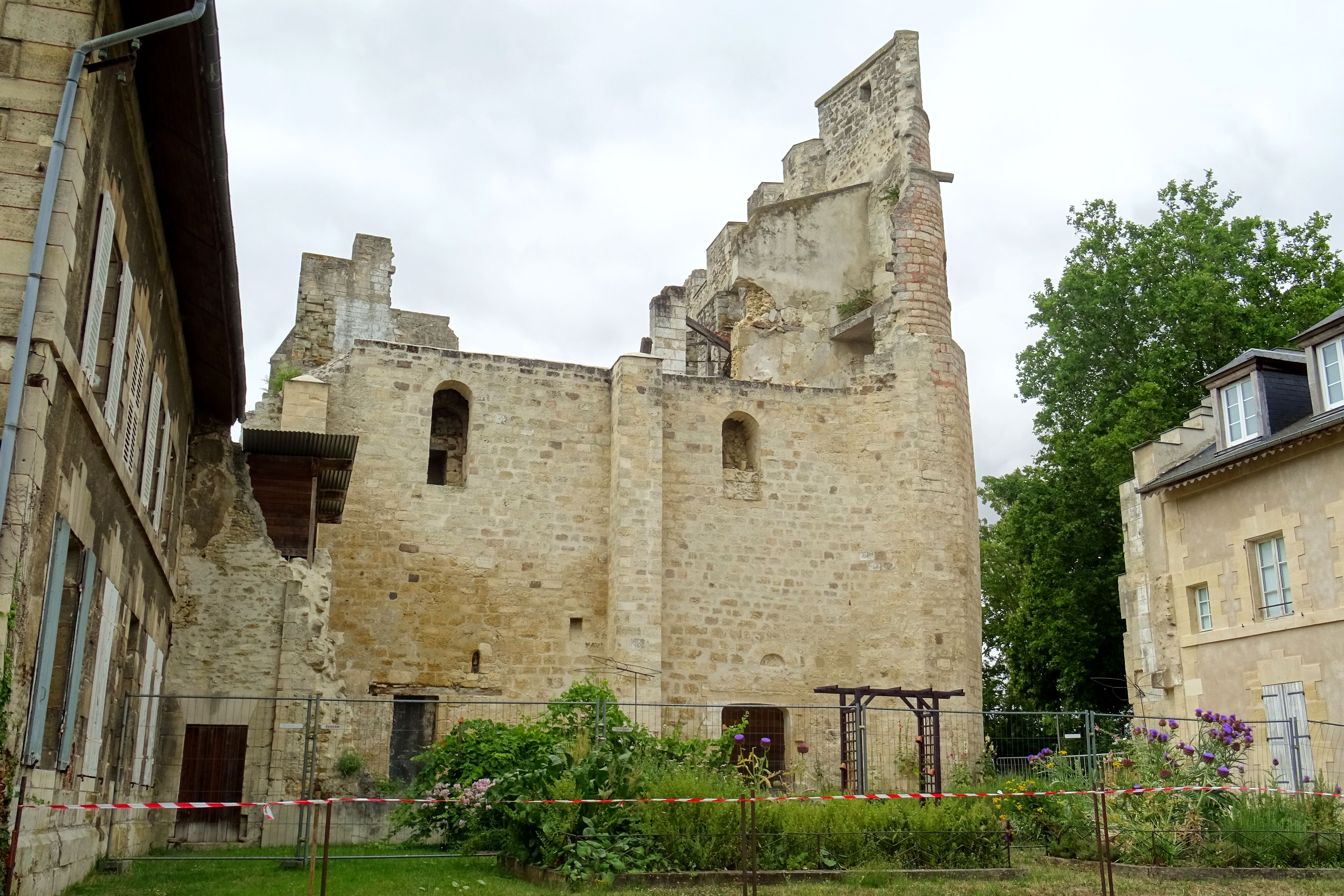
Remains of the keep of Clermont Castle

The Counts of Clermont-en-Beauvaisis should not be confused with the Counts of Clermont in Auvergne (here meaning the later Clermont-Ferrand). William V of Auvergne bore this title, and later the Dauphins of Auvergne, starting with Robert IV of Auvergne.

== First counts ==
- Baldwin I of Clermont (?–1023)
- Baldwin II of Clermont (1023–1042), son of Baldwin I.

== House of Clermont ==
- Renaud I of Clermont (1042–1088), son-in-law of Baldwin II
- Hugh of Clermont (1088–1101), son of Renaud I
- Renaud II of Clermont (1101–1161), son of Hugh I
- Raoul I of Clermont (1162–1191), son of Renaud II and Constable of France

== House of Blois ==
- Louis I, Count of Blois and Catherine of Clermont
- Theobald VI of Blois. He sold Clermont to Philip II of France in 1218.

== Capetians (1218) ==
- Philip Hurepel (1218–1234), son of Philip II of France
- Alberic (1234–?), son of Philip, resigned the title to his sister
- Jeanne, Countess of Clermont-en-Beauvaisis (?–1252), daughter of Philip. On her death without heirs, the title reverted to the crown.

== House of Bourbon (1268) ==
- Robert, Count of Clermont (1268–1317)
- Louis I, Duke of Bourbon (1317–1327, 1331–1342), son of Robert. Louis exchanged Clermont for La Marche in 1327, but it was returned to him in 1331.
- Peter I, Duke of Bourbon (1342–1356)
- Louis II, Duke of Bourbon (1356–1410)
- John I, Duke of Bourbon (1410–1434)
- Charles I, Duke of Bourbon (1434–1456)
- John II, Duke of Bourbon (1456–1488)
- Charles II, Duke of Bourbon (1488)
- Peter II, Duke of Bourbon (1488–1503)
- Suzanne, Duchess of Bourbon (1503–1521)
- Charles III, Duke of Bourbon (1521–1527). After his death, his fiefs were confiscated by the crown.

== House of Valois ==
- Charles II de Valois, Duke of Orléans (1540–1545)

== House of Orléans ==
- Henri, Comte de Paris, Duc de France (1957–1984, 1991–1999)
- François Henri Louis Marie, Comte de Clermont (1999–2017)

== Sources ==
- Baldwin, John W. (1986). The Government of Philip Augustus: Foundations of French Royal Power in the Middle Ages. University of California Press.
- Wood, Charles T. (1966). The French Apanages and the Capetian Monarchy, 1224-1328. Harvard University Press.
