= Theobald VI of Blois =

Count of Blois and Clermont-en-Beauvaisis

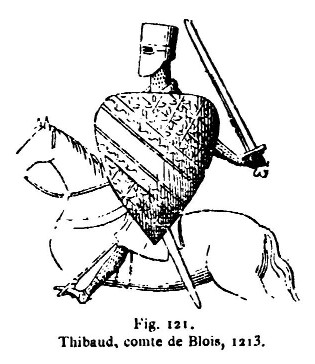
Theobald VI.

Theobald VI of Blois (French: Thibaut) (died 1218) was count of Blois and Clermont-en-Beauvaisis from 1205 to 1218.

He was son of Louis I of Blois and Catherine of Clermont.

Theobald married twice: with Maud of Alençon and with Clemence of Roches, but remained childless. Clemence married Geoffrey VI, Viscount of Châteaudun, as her second husband.

Theobald fought the Moors in Castile. During the campaign he contracted leprosy and returned home. After living withdrawn in his castle in La Ferté-Villeneuil for a few years, Theobald died in 1218, leaving his possessions to his aunts Margaret and Isabelle. The northern part of Blois was erected into the County of Chartres for Isabelle; Margaret received the remainder of the County of Blois, and his heirs sold Clermont to Philip II of France.

== Sources ==
- Baldwin, John W. (1986). The Government of Philip Augustus: Foundations of French Royal Power in the Middle Ages. University of California Press.
- Dickson, Gary (2008). The Children's Crusade: Medieval History, Modern Mythistory. Palgrave Macmillan.
- Peter of Blois (1993). Revell, Elizabeth (ed.). The Later Letters of Peter of Blois. Oxford University Press.

Theobald VI of Blois House of Blois Died: 1218
Preceded by Louis I	Count of Blois; 1205–1218	Succeeded by Margaret
Preceded by Louis I	Count of Chartres; 1205–1218	Succeeded by Isabelle
Preceded by Louis I	Count of Clermont-en-Beauvaisis; 1205–1218	to royal domain
