= Louis I of Blois =

French noble

Louis I
- Count of Blois jure uxoris Count of Clermont-en-Beauvaisis
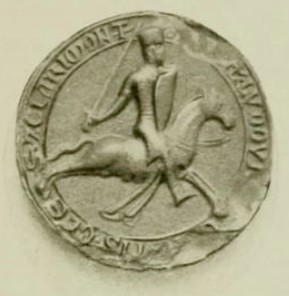
- Seal of Louis I
- Born: 1172
- Died: 14 April 1205 (aged 32–33)
- Noble family: House of Blois; House of Blois-Champagne; House of Blois-Chartres
- Spouse: Catherine, Countess of Clermont-en-Beauvaisis
- Issue: Raoul of Blois; Jeanne of Blois; Theobald VI, Count of Blois
- Father: Theobald V, Count of Blois
- Mother: Alix of France

Louis I of Blois (1172 – 14 April 1205) was Count of Blois from 1191 to 1205. He is best known for his participation in the Fourth Crusade and later prominent role in the Battle of Adrianople.

== Early life ==
He was the son of Theobald V and Alix of France. His maternal grandparents were Louis VII of France and his first wife, Eleanor of Aquitaine. Whilst in his teens, Louis joined his father on the Third Crusade.

Louis promulgated a charter in 1196 abolishing serfdom in his domains.

== Leadership in the Fourth Crusade ==
At the Tournament at Écry-sur-Aisne on 28 November 1199, count Louis and his cousin Theobald III of Champagne were the first major nobles to respond to Pope Innocent III's call for a Fourth Crusade. He left France in 1202, along with a gift of 1,000 marks from his uncle, King John of England. During the July 1203 siege of Constantinople, Louis was one of eight division commanders, the others including Boniface of Montferrat (the crusade leader), Doge Enrico Dandolo (leader of the Venetians), Baldwin of Flanders (who controlled the largest division and later became Latin Emperor of Constantinople), and Baldwin's brother Henry. During the siege Louis was one of the crusaders who had a meeting with Agnes of France, Louis' aunt who had been sent in Constantinople when she was around eight. Though she claimed to have forgotten his mother tongue to the crusaders, she held a private discussion with Louis without the help of any traductor.

Louis was later afflicted with a severe fever for months, and missed participating in the capture of Constantinople in 1204. He was too ill to take part in the subsequent forays of his men into Asia Minor, where he had been created Duke of Nicaea, a title he never vindicated as the city was captured by Theodore I Laskaris, founder of the Empire of Nicaea.

He had just recuperated when he participated in the Battle of Adrianople, where he was slain by a force of Cumans led by Kaloyan of Bulgaria ("Johanitza"). Louis chased the enemy too far, exhausting his men and horses and stretching them over a broad plain, where he brought himself and the Emperor Baldwin I of Constantinople into a trap.

== Family ==
He married Catherine, Countess of Clermont-en-Beauvaisis, they had:

1. Raoul, who died young
2. Jeanne, who died young
3. Theobald VI, Count of Blois

== Sources ==
- Allen, S.J. (2017). An Introduction to the Crusades. University of Toronto Press.
- Noble, Peter (2007). "Baldwin of Flanders and Henry of Hainault as Military Commanders in the Latin Empire of Constantinople". In Housley, Norman (ed.). Knighthoods of Christ: Essays on the History of the Crusades and the Knights Templar. Ashgate Publishing Limited.
- Peter of Blois (1993). Revell, Elizabeth (ed.). The Later Letters of Peter of Blois. Oxford University Press.
- Queller, Donald E.; Madden, Thomas F. (1997). The Fourth Crusade: The Conquest of Constantinople. University of Pennsylvania Press.
- Thompson, Kathleen (2002). Power and Border Lordship in Medieval France: The County of the Perche, 1000–1226. The Boydell Press.
- Tyerman, Christopher (2006). God's War: A New History of the Crusades. Harvard University Press. ISBN 978-0-674-02387-1.
- Williams, Jane Welch (1993). Bread, Wine, and Money: The Windows of the Trades at Chartres Cathedral. University of Chicago Press.

Louis I of Blois House of Blois Born: 1172 Died: 15 April 1205
Preceded by Theobald V	Count of Blois; 1191–1205	Succeeded by Theobald VI
Preceded by Raoul I	Count of Clermont-en-Beauvaisis; 1191–1205; With: Catherine of Clermont	Succeeded by Theobald VI
