= William II of Béthune =

French nobleman (died 1214)

William II, Lord of Béthune
- Ancient coat of arms of the House of Béthune
- Died: April 1214
- Noble family: House of Bethune
- Spouse: Mathilda of Dendermonde
- Issue: Robert VII, Lord of Béthune; Guillaume III
- Father: Robert V, Lord of Béthune
- Mother: Adelaide of Saint-Pol

William II, Lord of Béthune, nicknamed William the Red (French: Guillaume II « le Roux » de Bethune; d. April 1214) was a French nobleman. He was a ruling Lord of Béthune, Richebourg and Warneton, as well as hereditary advocatus of the Abbey of St. Vaast, near Arras.

== Family ==
He was a member of the influential House of Bethune, who had their ancestral seat in Béthune in the Artois region. He was the second son of Lord Robert V, nicknamed Robert the Red, and his wife Adelaide of Saint-Pol. His brothers were:

- Robert VI (d. 1193)
- Baldwin (d. 1212)
- Conon (d. 1219 or 1220), a famous trouvère and crusader
- Jean (d. 1219), bishop of Cambrai

== Life ==
William II and his elder brother Robert VI accompanied their father in the armed escort of Count Philip I of Flanders when he made a pilgrimage to the Holy Land in 1177. When they arrived in the Kingdom of Jerusalem, William II and Robert VI wanted to marry Sibylla and Isabella, the sisters of King Baldwin IV of Jerusalem. The King, however, turned them down.

In 1191, the Béthune family, now including the younger brothers Baldwin and Conon, accompanied Count Philip I and their father on another pilgrimage to the Third Crusade. During the crusade, both Philip I and Robert V died.

When Robert VI died childless in 1193, William II inherited the Béthune family possessions. He married Mathilda, the heiress of Dendermonde and had several children with her, including Daniel, who succeeded him, and John, who married the heiress of Saint-Pol, Elizabeth.

Members of the Béthune family had divided loyalties in the conflict between King Philip II of France and Count Baldwin IX of Flanders about who was the rightful liege lord of Artois. William II and his oldest son Daniel sided with France, while his younger brothers and his son Robert VII sided with Flanders.

On 23 February 1200, William II and Conon departed to accompany Count Baldwin during the Fourth Crusade. Conon became famous for his heroic deeds; William's actions were less noticeable. He was present when the crusaders took Constantinople in April 1204. Baldwin IX of Flanders was elected Emperor of the newly founded Latin Empire as Baldwin I. After the disastrous Battle of Adrianople, where William did not participate, he and 7000 other crusaders returned home. Conon and Cardinal Peter of Capua tried in vain, and according to de Villehardouin in tears, to persuade William to stay in Constantinople. Conon remained in Constantinople, and died there several years later.

== Issue ==
Married Mathilda of Dendermonde and had seven known children, the first five born by 1194:

- Daniel, Lord of Béthune (died 1227), who married Eustacia of Châtillon, daughter of Walter III of Châtillon and his wife Elizabeth, Countess of Saint-Pol.
- Robert VII, Lord of Béthune (died 1248), who married Elizabeth of Morialmé.
- Baldwin of Béthune, who died young and unmarried.
- Alice of Béthune (died 1256), who before 1215 married Walter II of Nanteuil.
- Maud of Béthune (died 1251), who married first Baldwin III of Comines, secondly Godfrey III of Breda, thirdly Gilbert of Zottegem, and fourthly Arnold V of Diest.
- William III of Bethune (died 1243), who married Elizabeth of Roesbrugge. A junior line of the House of Béthune, descended from him survives to this day as Lords of Meulebeke.
- John of Béthune (died 1238), who married Elizabeth, Countess of Saint-Pol, widow of Walter III of Châtillon and mother of Eustacia, his sister-in-law.

== Death ==
William died in April 1214, a few months before the Battle of Bouvines.
