= Matilda of Dendermonde =

Flemish noblewoman (died 1224)

- Died: 14 April 1224
- Noble family: House of Dendermonde
- Spouses: Gerard III of Grimbergen; William II, Lord of Béthune
- Issue: Daniel, Lord of Béthune; Robert VII, Lord of Béthune; Maud of Béthune; John of Béthune (died 1238)
- Father: Walter II of Dendermonde
- Mother: Adela of Rozoy

Matilda of Dendermonde (died 14 April 1224) was a Flemish noblewoman.

== Life ==
Born about 1165, she was the daughter and heiress of Walter II, Lord of Dendermonde, son of Walter I and his wife Adela of Rozoy, Lady of Buysscheure, whose parents were Reynold, Lord of Rozoy, and Juliana of Rumigny. Her first marriage, without any surviving children, was to Gerard III, Lord of Grimbergen.

Before 1190 she married William II, Lord of Béthune. Her father had died by 1194 and she was his heiress, bringing to her husband her ancestral lands of Dendermonde, Meulebeke, and Lokeren, as well as the hereditary office of advocatus of the Abbey of Saint Bavo at Ghent.

When her husband died in 1214, the Count of Flanders was at war with the King of France and the town of Béthune was in the hands of French troops. As her eldest son Daniel was still under age, the commander of the French forces put Matilda in charge of the town. She assumed her late husband's titles, calling herself advocatus of Arras until 1216, when Daniel had reached age 21 and become Lord of Béthune. She however remained Lady of Dendermonde and advocatus of Ghent, defending her hereditary rights against challenges. In 1223 she founded the abbey of St Giles at Dendermonde for Cistercian nuns, the charter being witnessed by many of her children and relations who she trusted to maintain the abbey after her death, which occurred in 1224.

== Family ==
She and William had seven known children, the first five born by 1194:

- Daniel, Lord of Béthune (died 1227), who married Eustacia of Châtillon, daughter of Walter III of Châtillon and his wife Elizabeth, Countess of Saint-Pol.
- Robert VII, Lord of Béthune (died 1248), who married Elizabeth of Morialmé.
- Baldwin of Béthune, who died young and unmarried.
- Alice of Béthune (died 1256), who before 1215 married Walter II of Nanteuil.
- Maud of Béthune (died 1251), who married first Baldwin III of Comines, secondly Godfrey III of Breda, thirdly Gilbert of Zottegem, and fourthly Arnold V of Diest.
- William III of Béthune (died 1243), who married Elizabeth of Roesbrugge. A junior line of the House of Béthune, descended from him survives to this day as Lords of Meulebeke.
- John of Béthune (died 1238), who married Elizabeth, Countess of Saint-Pol, widow of Walter III of Châtillon and mother of Eustacia, his sister-in-law.
