= Robert VII =

Robert VII may refer to:

- Robert VII, Lord of Béthune
- Robert VII of Auvergne
- Robert VII de Bruce
