= Chroniques de France =

Chroniques de France (Chronicles of France) may refer to:

- Grandes Chroniques de France, a vast compilation (13th-15th century) of material on the history of France
- Chroniques des rois de France, a compilation (c.1220-1230) of material on the history of France by an anonymous author designated "Chantilly-Vatican"; see Robert VII, Lord of Béthune
