= Baldwin of Béthune =

French knight

Baldwin of Béthune or Baldwin de Béthune (French: Baudouin de Béthune Dutch: Boudewijn van Béthune) (c. 1158–1212), a French knight from the House of Béthune in Artois and a crusader, was close companion to successive English kings and on marriage to Hawise of Aumale became Count of Aumale with extensive estates in England.

== Origins ==
Baldwin was the third son of Robert V of Béthune, hereditary Lord of Béthune and advocate of the Abbey of Saint Vaast at Arras, and his wife Alice, daughter of Hugh III, Count of Saint-Pol. His brothers included:

Robert VI of Béthune, Advocate of Arras and Lord of Béthune;
William II of Béthune, who succeeded his brother as Advocate of Arras and Lord of Béthune;
John of Béthune, Bishop of Cambrai; and
Conon of Béthune, poet, crusader and Regent of the Latin Empire of Constantinople.

His date of birth is unknown but would have been shortly before 1160, probably at Béthune.

== Career ==
His career was as a knight in royal service, not with the kings of his native France but with their English opponents.

In 1170, still in his teens, he was with his lifelong friend, William Marshal, in the court of Henry the Young King. In 1180 at the great international tournament of Lagny-sur-Marne, he was a knight banneret, leading the Flemish team while William headed the English team.

About 1187, he was rewarded with his first landholding in England and, once king, Richard I of England added the lordship of several other manors. These not only gave him income but also, at least as important in those times, added to his rank of knight the status of a feudal landowner.

In 1191 he was with Richard's contingent on the Third Crusade in Palestine where his father Robert, who was with the Flemish contingent, died. When Richard set out on his incognito voyage home in 1192, Baldwin was with him. They were blown ashore in a December storm near Aquileia and the disguised Richard was captured by his Austrian enemies at an inn near Vienna.

Baldwin stood hostage for him, let loose to organise a ransom into which he put not only months of effort but much of his own money as well. As well as cash to free Richard, Leopold V, Duke of Austria wanted two princesses, including Eleanor, Richard's niece. Early in December 1194, Baldwin was sent with the two princesses to Vienna and told that if he did not turn up with them his life would be forfeit. Before they arrived, the Duke died and with him the death threat.

In 1195 Baldwin married Hawise of Aumale, a great Anglo-Norman heiress, gaining through his wife vast lands and the title of Count of Aumale. The lands of Aumale itself were however lost shortly after in 1196, when the French captured and kept them. In 1197 Baldwin was one of the English delegates to the election of Richard's nephew Otto IV of Germany as Holy Roman Emperor.

When John succeeded Richard as king in 1199, Baldwin was initially in his immediate circle. In 1200 he was one of John's guarantors for the peace signed with the French king, Philip and the next year he was one of the signatories to a royal grant. After that he seems to have become less close to the king and no doubt occupied himself with running both his wife's and his own extensive estates in England.

On 13 or 14 October 1212 he died, probably in Hawise's house at Burstwick in Yorkshire, and was buried in the chapter house at Meaux Abbey, of which nothing remains. On 3 November 1212, Hawise promised the king 5000 marks (equivalent to over £3 million in 2014) to keep her lands and avoid a fourth marriage.

On the death of his father in 1199 Baldwin had become Advocate of the Abbey of Chocques and guaranteed its rights and privileges. After he died, in memory of his donations, the abbot and monks prayed daily for his soul and held a solemn mass on the anniversary of his death.

== Marriage and family ==
King Henry II promised both William Marshal and Baldwin that he would find them rich heiresses to marry and in 1189 was arranging a match for Baldwin with the heiress of Châteauroux in the French province of Berry when he died. His son and successor Richard gave her to a French noble instead, saying he would find someone better for Baldwin.

It was not until 1194, when Richard got back to England from crusade and captivity, that he fulfilled the promise and gave Baldwin the twice-widowed Hawise of Aumale. Their wedding was in the cathedral of Sées in Lower Normandy, with Richard paying for both the celebrations and the honeymoon trip to England.

Not long after, Baldwin and Hawise had a daughter Alice, no doubt named after his mother. While still a child, she was engaged in 1203 to William Marshal the younger, son of William Marshal and Isabel of Pembroke. As Baldwin's heiress, it was specified in the contract that she would bring all his lands in England to her husband. (Hawise's lands were to go to her son William de Forz.) Alice did not long outlive her father, dying in her teens without having any children.

Some sources have claimed Baldwin as the ancestor of the Béthunes in Scotland, who start appearing in records there shortly after his death. Though some are called John, the name of one of Baldwin's brothers, and some Robert, the name of another brother, none are ever called Baldwin.

Baldwin did in fact have a son called Baldwin, whether legitimate from a brief early marriage or illegitimate is unrecorded. He seems to have settled in Northamptonshire, first at Greens Norton as a tenant of his brother-in-law William Marshal the younger, by then 2nd Earl of Pembroke, and later at Gayton, where in 1240 he exercised the right of presentation though the manor was held by his cousin Robert VII, Lord of Béthune. He married a woman called Joan de Traily but nothing is known of any children. He did not inherit the seigneurie of Chocques, which was in the hands of Baldwin's younger brother John in 1219.

This Baldwin, described as Baldevinus filius Comitis de Albemarle, may have been the Baldwin of Béthune, who became Lord of Adrianople in the Latin Empire of Constantinople. Alternatively, Baldwin of Adrianople may have been a son of Conon of Béthune who held the Byzantine titles of protovestiarios and sebastokrator.

== Landholdings ==
A list of lands held in his own right, rather than through his wife, by Baldwin of Béthune.

In England, using county boundaries in force at the time:
In Bedfordshire : Luton.
In Berkshire : Wantage.
In Hampshire : Ovington, Polhampton near Overton, Upper Clatford
In Hertfordshire : Rushden
In Kent : Brabourne, Kemsing, Sutton Valence.
In Norfolk : Foulsham, an unidentified place written as Roltesham.
In Northamptonshire : Greens Norton, Wollaston.
In Somerset : Haselbury Plucknett.
In Worcestershire : Severn Stoke.
In Yorkshire : Hedon, which may have been held jointly with his wife.

In France:
Chocques,
Eecke,
Lapugnoy,
Westrozebeke
St Pierre Mesnil and St Sauveur.

== Ancestry ==
Ancestors of Baldwin of Béthune

16. Robert III of Béthune, Advocate of Arras & Lord of Béthune
8. Robert IV of Béthune, Advocate of Arras & Lord of Béthune
17.
4. William I of Béthune, Advocate of Arras & Lord of Béthune
18. Robert II of Warneton
9. Alice of Warneton
19.
2. Robert V of Béthune, Advocate of Arras & Lord of Béthune
20. Hugh I of Oisy, Castellan of Cambrai
10. Hugh II of Oisy, Castellan of Cambrai
21. Ada of Rumigny
5. Clemency of Oisy
22. Goswin I of Mons
11. Hildegard of Mons
23. Ermengarde of Chaumont
1. Baldwin of Béthune, Count of Aumale
24. Manasses of St Pol
12. Hugh II, Count of Saint-Pol
25.
6. Hugh III, Count of St Pol
26. Enguerrand II, Count of Ponthieu
13. Elisande of Montreuil
27. Adelaide of Normandy
3. Alice of St Pol
28.
14.
29.
7. Beatrice
30.
15.
31.
