= John of Béthune (died 1238) =

French nobleman

John of Béthune (French: Jean de Béthune; died 1238) was a French nobleman and military leader in the County of Artois.

John was the fifth son of William II, lord of Béthune, and Matilda, heiress of Dendermonde. As such, he inherited little money and no land. His eldest brother, Daniel, lord of Béthune, was the first husband of Eustachie, daughter of Lord Gaucher III of Châtillon and the Countess Elisabeth of Saint-Pol. In 1228, between June and November, John married the widowed Elisabeth, who was almost forty. They had no children.

John is first attested in 1220. In 1223, he subscribed his mother's act founding an abbey dedicated to Saint Giles in Dendermonde. According to Alain Derville, John served the King of England in a military capacity before returning to Artois. According to the chronicler Philippe Mousket, he led the armies of Count Ferdinand of Flanders against Duke Henry I of Brabant in 1227 in support of the lord of Enghien.

John's marriage the following year was probably meant to seal an alliance between Elisabeth and Ferdinand against Philip Hurepel, who was challenging Blanche of Castile for the regency of France. The marriage was within the prohibited degree of kinship, but the attempts of Enguerrand of Coucy and Elisabeth's son Hugh V to have it annulled failed. As husband of the countess of Saint-Pol, John was deputed to receive the homage of the abbot of Anchin. According to William of Andres, Ferdinand invaded Saint-Pol in 1229, but was defeated by Elisabeth's son Hugh, an ally of Hurepel. After this, John's role in his wife's life ceased, although the rights he had acquired in Encre through her were recognized by Hugh in 1233.

Afterwards, John went to the Latin Empire of Constantinople. He returned to the west with the Emperor Baldwin II in 1236 and was given command of the army raised by Baldwin to retake Constantinople from John of Brienne. He set out for the east in early 1238. When the army's passage through Italy was blocked by the German emperor Frederick II, who preferred an alliance with Bulgaria over Baldwin, John of Béthune gave himself as a hostage to Frederick. The army was allowed to pass, but soon after his release John died at Venice. His death caused the army to disintegrate.
