= Hôtel de Ville, Lagny-sur-Marne =

Town hall in Lagny-sur-Marne, France

Hôtel de Ville
- The main frontage of the Hôtel de Ville in July 2025

General information
- Type: City hall
- Architectural style: Neoclassical style
- Location: Lagny-sur-Marne, France
- Coordinates: 48.8775°N 2.7054°E
- Completed: 1765

Monument historique
- Official name: Abbaye Saint-Pierre (ancienne)
- Type: Inscrit
- Designated: 1969
- Reference no.: PA00087043

The Hôtel de Ville (French pronunciation: [otɛl də vil], City Hall) is a municipal building in Lagny-sur-Marne, Seine-et-Marne, in the eastern suburbs of Paris, standing on Place de l'Hôtel de Ville. It was designated a monument historique by the French government in 1969.

== History ==
The wedding room

The buildings which currently form the town hall were originally commissioned as part of Lagny Abbey and formed the northwestern part of the abbey complex, adjacent to the abbey chapel, now the Church of Notre-Dame-des-Ardents et Saint-Pierre. Construction of these buildings started in 1755. They were designed in the neoclassical style, built in ashlar stone and were completed in 1765.

Following the French Revolution, the buildings were seized by the state and the monks were driven out. They were subsequently used as a military hospital and then acquired by the town council for municipal use in 1842. The facades of these buildings were then remodelled in red brick with stone finishings.

The design involved a main frontage of eight bays facing onto the town square with the first three bays on the left projected forward as a pavilion. The central bay of the pavilion featured a stone plaque commemorating the arrival of Joan of Arc in the town where she defeated an Anglo-Burgundian force in April 1430 during the Hundred Years' War. On the first floor, there was a segmental headed French door with a keystone, a stone surround and a balustraded balcony and, at roof level, there was an aedicula containing a coat of arms surmounted by a clock. The outer bays were fenestrated by casement windows with keystones and stone surrounds. The main block, to the right of the pavilion, was fenestrated in a similar style.

In 1896, one of the reception rooms was ornately decorated to create the Salle des Mariages (wedding room). In the late 19th century, Alphonse James de Rothschild, whose seat was at Château de Ferrières, donated three fine paintings to the council for display in this room. A Louis XIV cartel clock, dating from 1755, and a Louis XVI clock, dating from 1785, were also installed there. Further improvements were made to create the Salon d'Honneur (main hall) in 1936.

In the years of German occupation of the town, during the Second World War, the German authorities established a local command centre in the town hall. This ceased when the town was liberated by American troops on 28 August 1944.
