= Lagny-sur-Marne =

- Commune
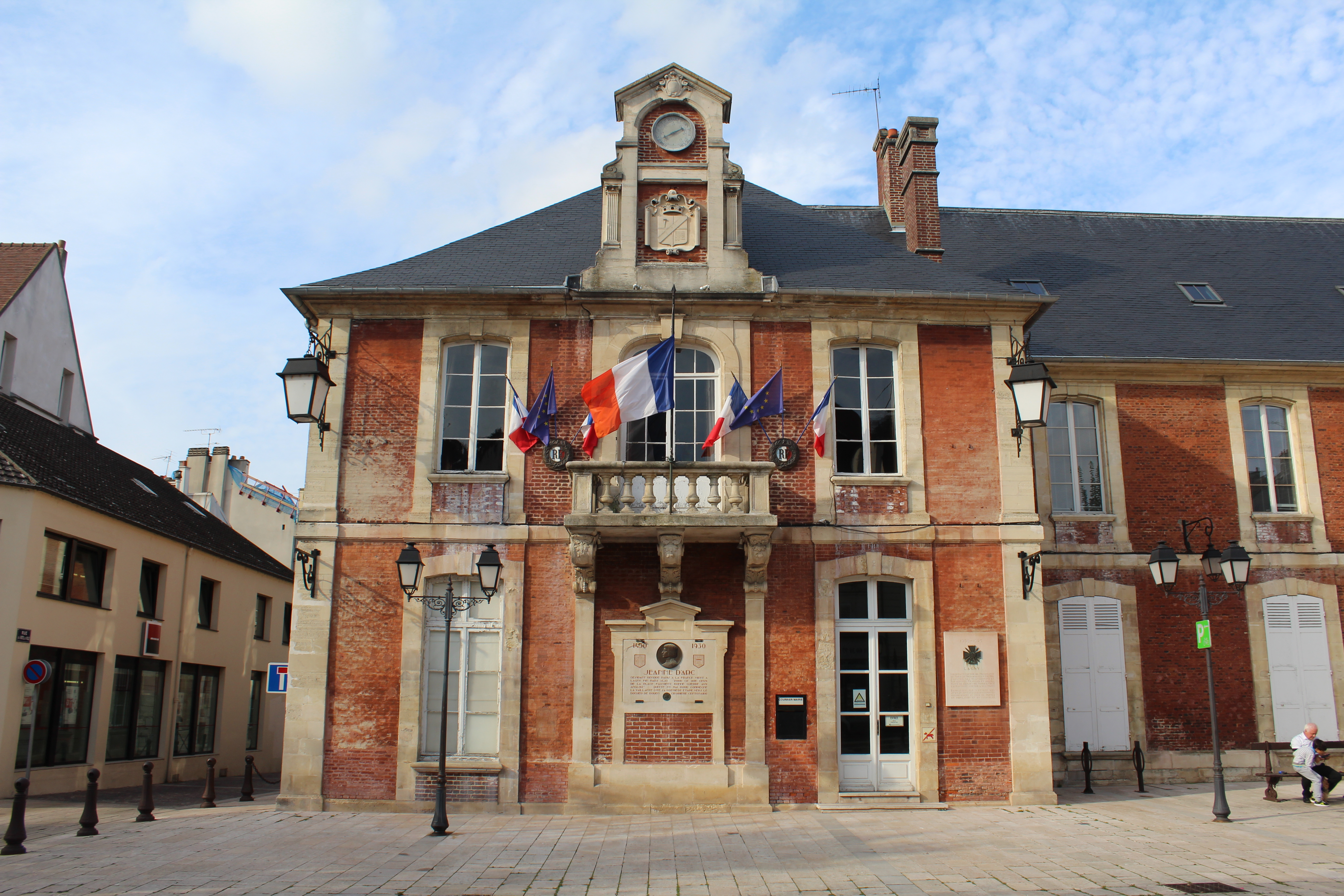
- The Hôtel de Ville

- Coat of arms

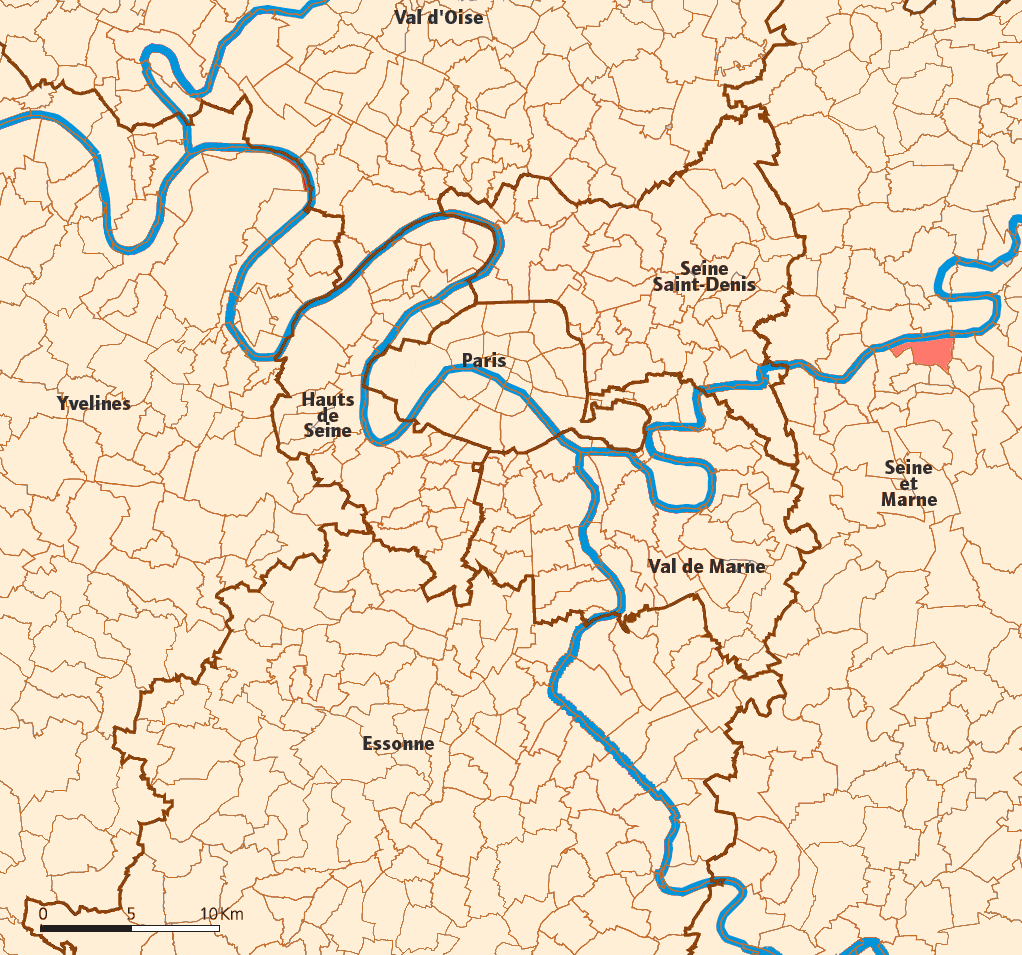
- Location (in red) within Paris inner and outer suburbs
- Location of Lagny-sur-Marne
- Location within France Location within Île-de-France (region)
- Coordinates: 48°52′44″N 2°42′27″E
- Country: France
- Region: Île-de-France
- Department: Seine-et-Marne
- Arrondissement: Torcy
- Canton: Lagny-sur-Marne
- Intercommunality: Marne et Gondoire

Government
  - Mayor (2020–2026): Jean-Paul Michel
- Area^{1}: 5.72 km^{2} (2.21 sq mi)
- Elevation: 44 m (144 ft)
- Highest elevation: 112 m (367 ft)
- Lowest elevation: 37 m (121 ft)
- Population (2023): 21,461
  - Density: 3,750/km^{2} (9,720/sq mi)
- Demonym: Latignaciens
- Time zone: UTC+01:00 (CET)
  - Summer (DST): UTC+02:00 (CEST)
- INSEE/Postal code: 77243 /77400
- Website: www.lagny-sur-marne.fr
- ^{1} French Land Register data, which excludes lakes, ponds, glaciers > 1 km^{2} (0.386 sq mi or 247 acres) and river estuaries.

Lagny-sur-Marne (French pronunciation: [laɲi syʁ maʁn]; lit. 'Lagny-on-Marne'), officially simply Lagny until 1971, is a commune in the eastern outer suburbs of Paris, France. It is located in the Seine-et-Marne department in Île-de-France, 26.1 km (16.2 mi) from the centre of Paris (25 minutes by train from Gare de l'Est).

The commune of Lagny-sur-Marne is part of the Val de Bussy sector, one of the four sectors in the "new town" of Marne-la-Vallée.

== History ==
From 644, Lagny-sur-Marne was the site of Lagny Abbey, a monastery founded that year, and after its destruction by the Normans refounded about 990. The monastery was seized by the state at the French Revolution and its buildings are used since 1842 as the offices of the municipality.

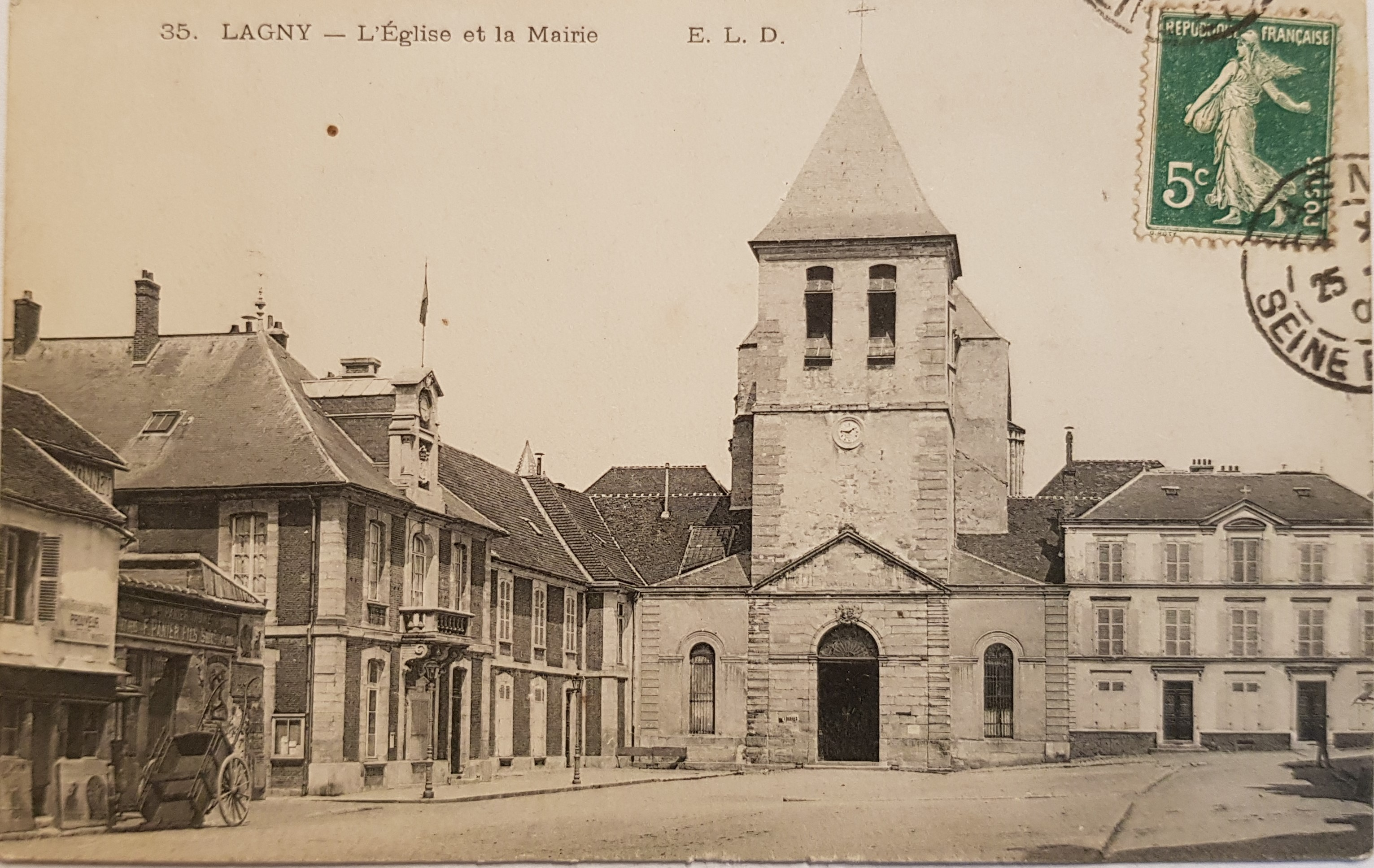
Église Notre-Dame-des-Ardents and town hall on an old postcard

During the Middle Ages Lagny-sur-Marne was one of the most popular places for tourneys in Northern France. In November 1179 a notable tournament was held by Louis VII of France in honour of the coronation of his son.

In 1170, the young knight Baldwin of Bethune and his lifelong friend, William Marshal were at the court of Henry the Young King. In 1180 at the great international tournament of Lagny, Baldwin was a knight banneret, leading the Flemish team while William headed the English team.

The Hôtel de Ville, which was established in the buildings of the former Lagny Abbey, was completed in 1765.

The town was one of the hosts of the Champagne fairs in the 12th and 13th centuries.

In 1846, Lagny-sur-Marne annexed the commune of Saint-Denis-du-Port.

Town hall of Lagny-sur-Marne
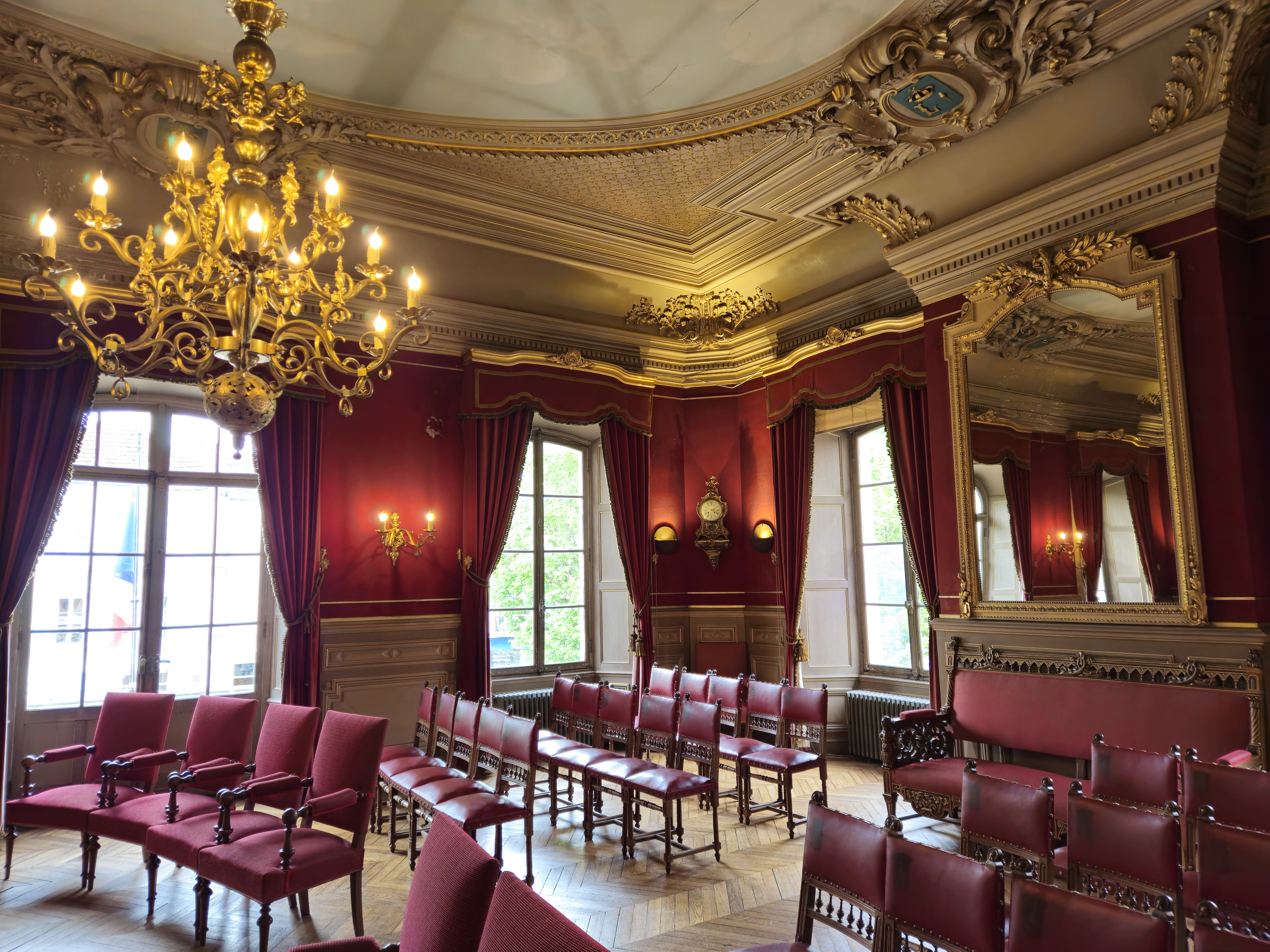
Salle des Mariages (Wedding Hall)

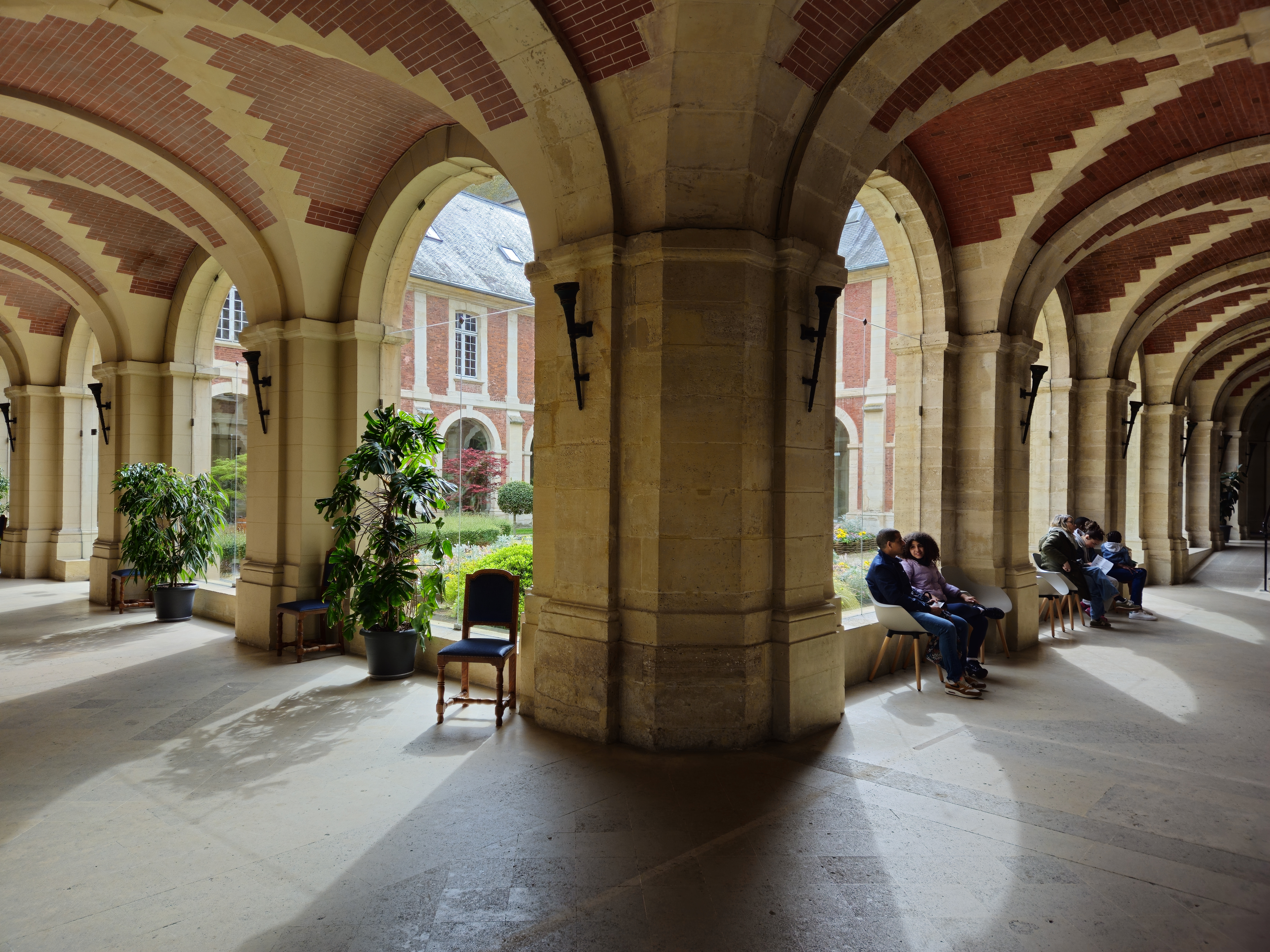
Former cloister

== Demographics ==
Inhabitants are called Latignaciens or Laniaques in French.

Historical population

Year	Pop.	±% p.a.
1793	1,607	—
1800	1,745	+1.18%
1806	1,786	+0.39%
1821	1,753	−0.12%
1831	1,869	+0.64%
1836	2,029	+1.66%
1841	2,212	+1.74%
1846	2,407	+1.70%
1851	2,716	+2.44%
1856	2,817	+0.73%
1861	3,458	+4.19%
1866	3,988	+2.89%
1872	3,999	+0.05%
1876	4,272	+1.66%
1881	4,621	+1.58%
1886	4,990	+1.55%
1891	4,998	+0.03%
1896	5,341	+1.34%
1901	5,442	+0.38%

Year	Pop.	±% p.a.
1906	5,560	+0.43%
1911	5,880	+1.13%
1921	6,302	+0.70%
1926	6,936	+1.94%
1931	7,642	+1.96%
1936	8,310	+1.69%
1946	7,960	−0.43%
1954	8,982	+1.52%
1962	11,945	+3.63%
1968	15,743	+4.71%
1975	16,465	+0.64%
1982	17,959	+1.25%
1990	18,643	+0.47%
1999	19,368	+0.42%
2007	20,401	+0.65%
2012	20,328	−0.07%
2017	21,356	+0.99%
2023	21,461	+0.08%

Source: EHESS and INSEE (1968–2023)

== Economy ==
When video game company Titus Interactive was active, its head office was in Lagny-sur-Marne.

== Transport ==
Lagny-sur-Marne is served by the Lagny–Thorigny station, on the Transilien Paris – Est suburban rail line. The station, administratively located in neighbouring commune of Thorigny-sur-Marne, is immediately across the river Marne from the centre of Lagny-sur-Marne.

== Education ==
The commune has ten preschools and nine elementary schools. There are two junior high schools, Collège Les 4 Arpents and Collège Marcel Rivière, as well as one senior high school/sixth-form college, Lycée Van Dongen.

== Twin towns ==
Lagny-sur-Marne is twinned with Sainte-Agathe-des-Monts, Quebec in Canada since 1969, and also with Alnwick, Northumberland in the United Kingdom.

== Notable residents ==
- Christopher Jullien (born 1993), footballer
- Paul Pogba (born 1993), footballer
- Christopher Nkunku (born 1997), footballer
- Benjamin Boukpeti (born 1981), Togolese canoeist who won a bronze medal in the 2008 Summer Olympics, which was Togo's first ever Olympic medal.
- Valéry Aubertin (born 1970), the organist and composer, was born in Lagny-sur-Marne
- Édouard Cortès (1882–1969), Post-Impressionist painter
- Salomé Saqué (born 1995), journalist and writer

== See also ==
- Communes of the Seine-et-Marne department
