= Adele of Dreux =

Norman French noblewoman

Coat-of-arms of Dreux.

Adèle of Dreux (1145 – after 1210) was a member of Norman French nobility, daughter of Robert I, Count of Dreux and his second wife Hawise of Salisbury.

She married Valéran III, Count of Breteuil on 24 June 1156, and they had:

- Adèle (d. 1195), married Raoul le Roux.
- Amicia (1160–1226), married Baldwin de Yerres, John Briard & Gauthier de Rinsel
- Mahaut, married Simon of Clermont (d. 1187)

After Valéran's death in 1162, she married secondly Guy II of Châtillon. They had:

- Guy III (d. 1191)
- Alix (d. 1193), married William de Garlande (d. 1216),
- Walter III of Châtillon
- Marie of Châtillon, first wife of Renaud I, Count of Dammartin, divorced 1190. (2) Married Robert de Vieuxpont.(3) Married John III, count of Vendome.

She married thirdly John I de Thorotte and they had:

- John, castellan of Noyon (d. 1237), married Odette de Dampierre (d. 1212)
- Ralph, bishop of Verdun (1224–1245)

Her final marriage was to Ralph, Count of Soissons, with whom she had:

- Gertrude (d. 1220); married Matthew II of Montmorency, (d. 1230)
- Eleanor, who married Stephen II of Sancerre (died 1252) (son of Stephen I of Sancerre)

Adèle died after 1210.

== Sources ==
- Evergates, Theodore (2007). The Aristocracy in the County of Champagne, 1100-1300. University of Pennsylvania Press.
- Painter, Sidney (2019). The Scourge of the Clergy: Peter of Dreux, Duke of Brittany. Johns Hopkins University Press.
- Pollock, M. A. (2015). Scotland, England and France After the Loss of Normandy, 1204-1296. The Boydell Press.
- Power, Daniel (2004). The Norman frontier in the twelfth and early thirteenth centuries. Cambridge University Press.
- Richard, Jean (1992). Lloyd, Simon (ed.). Saint Louis: Crusader King of France. Translated by Birrell, Jean. Cambridge University Press.
