= Salomé Saqué =

French journalist

Salomé Saqué (born 10 May 1995 in Lagny-sur-Marne, Seine-et-Marne) is a French journalist and writer. She has covered climate change, young people, as well as the rise of fascism and gender inequality.

== Early life and education ==
Salomé Saqué was born in Seine-et-Marne, the eldest of three children. After she was born, her parents decided to leave the Paris region and she grew up in Ardèche. She attended a boarding school in Aubenas.

After taking her baccalauréat, she studied history and geography at the Lycée Édouard-Herriot in Lyon. She then attended Lumière University Lyon 2 to study political science and English. She became interested in the Spanish left wing movement Podemos and joined the Erasmus programme at the Complutense University of Madrid.

At the same time, she took courses in drama at the Regional Conservatory of Lyon and played a number of roles on stage.

She then moved to Paris for her studies, where she obtained two different master's degrees.

== Career ==
Saqué spent three years as an intern for the newspaper Le Monde diplomatique and then France 24.

She has since worked for the website Blast, the television channels LCP, Arte, and France 5, and the radio network France Info.

Her first book, Sois jeune et tais-toi (Be Young and Shut Up) received critical acclaim and was a bestseller on its release. Le Monde said it "paints a nuanced portrait of French youth subjected to ecological and economic crises, while avoiding declaring war on the boomers".

== Works ==
- Saqué, Salomé (2023). Sois jeune et tais-toi: Réponse à ceux qui critiquent la jeunesse. Payot. p. 250. ISBN 978-2-228-93163-2.
- Saqué, Salomé (2024). Résister. Payot. p. 144. ISBN 978-2-228-93759-7.
