= John of Béthune (died 1219) =

French cleric (died 1219)

Jean de Béthune (died 1219), a member of the noble House of Bethune, was a French cleric who became the Roman Catholic bishop of the diocese of Cambrai and ruler of the principality of Cambrésis in the Holy Roman Empire.

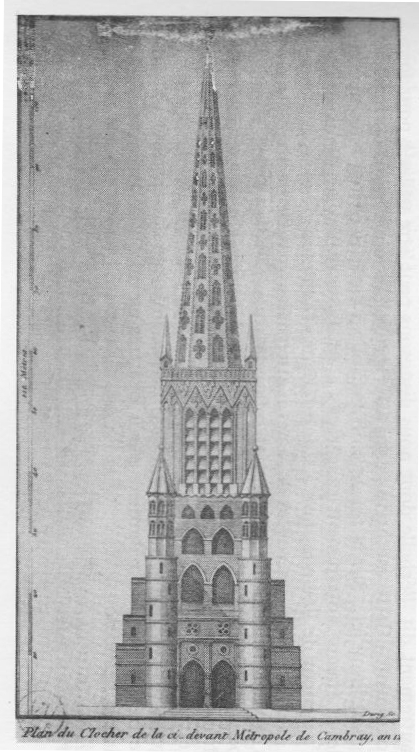
West end of the old cathedral of Cambrai

== Origins ==
Born around 1160, presumably at Béthune, he was a younger son of Robert V de Béthune (died 1191), hereditary Lord of Béthune and Advocate of the Abbey of Saint Vaast at Arras, and his wife Alice, daughter of Hugh III, Count of Saint-Pol. His brothers included:

Robert VI (died 1193), crusader, who succeeded his father as Lord of Béthune.
William II (died 1214), crusader, who succeeded his brother Robert VI as Lord of Béthune.
Baldwin (died 1212), crusader and companion of the English kings Henry II and Richard I Lionheart, who died on his estate in Yorkshire.
Conon (died 1220), trouvère and crusader, who became Regent of the Latin Empire of Constantinople and died in Thrace.

== Early life ==
Destined for a church career, by 1182 he was provost of the church of St Amé at Douai. An appointment to the church of St Piat at Seclin was however contested by Matilda of Portugal, widow of Philip I, Count of Flanders, who complained to Pope Innocent III. Innocent put the question to a panel of arbitrators and they in the end accepted Jean.

With his brother Baldwin, he was a supporter of Richard Lionheart and in 1198 was part of the English delegation to Cologne for the election and coronation of Richard's nephew and foster son Otto of Brunswick as King of the Romans.

== Bishop of Cambrai ==
For this, Otto nominated him to the bishopric of Cambrai in December 1200. He went to Cologne to seek investiture of the regalities from Otto, who granted them in September 1201.In Otto's ensuing conflicts with the Hohenstaufens, he was a loyal supporter.

In 1208 he was a potential candidate to become Archbishop of Cologne, one of the three most important sees in Germany, but objections were raised because he spoke no German (which suggests that he spoke only French, Latin and maybe Flemish). In 1209, as a prince of the Empire, he accompanied Otto to Rome for his coronation in St Peter's Basilica as Holy Roman Emperor.

At Cambrai, his position was complex. As bishop, he presided over an extensive diocese which covered a large part of present-day Belgium, including important cities like Brussels and stretching as far north as Antwerp. He was also secular lord of the town of Cambrai and prince of the independent principality of Cambrésis, which surrounded the city and formed part of the Holy Roman Empire. Relations between the bishops and the inhabitants of the town of Cambrai had often been tense, and in 1212 the townspeople obtained a charter from Otto's rival, Frederick, King of Sicily, granting them rights and privileges which curtailed the power of the bishop and the church.

The defeat of Otto and his allies at the Battle of Bouvines in 1214 meant that from then on the major power in the region was France, under the victorious King Philip II, while much of Germany recognised Frederick. Immediately after the battle, in which Philip had captured Ferdinand, Count of Flanders, Jean was one of three bishops asked by his wife Joan, Countess of Flanders, to negotiate the prisoner's ransom and release, but without success.

Jean was obliged to waive his loyalty to Otto and to accept the authority of Frederick, swearing him fidelity and obtaining a re-grant of the regalities from his hands. In 1215, Frederick granted Jean a new charter in which he recognised him as a prince of the Empire and as a kinsman.

In 1212, on the death of his brother Baldwin without a surviving son, he had inherited the lordship of Chocques near Béthune. Early in 1219, he joined the Albigensian Crusade, in which King Philip's son Louis led an army south and captured the town of Marmande in June, massacring its inhabitants. The force moved on to besiege Toulouse, which held out, and it was during this engagement that Jean fell ill and died on 27 July.

His body was taken back to his diocese and buried in front of the altar in the Cistercian abbey of Vaucelles.

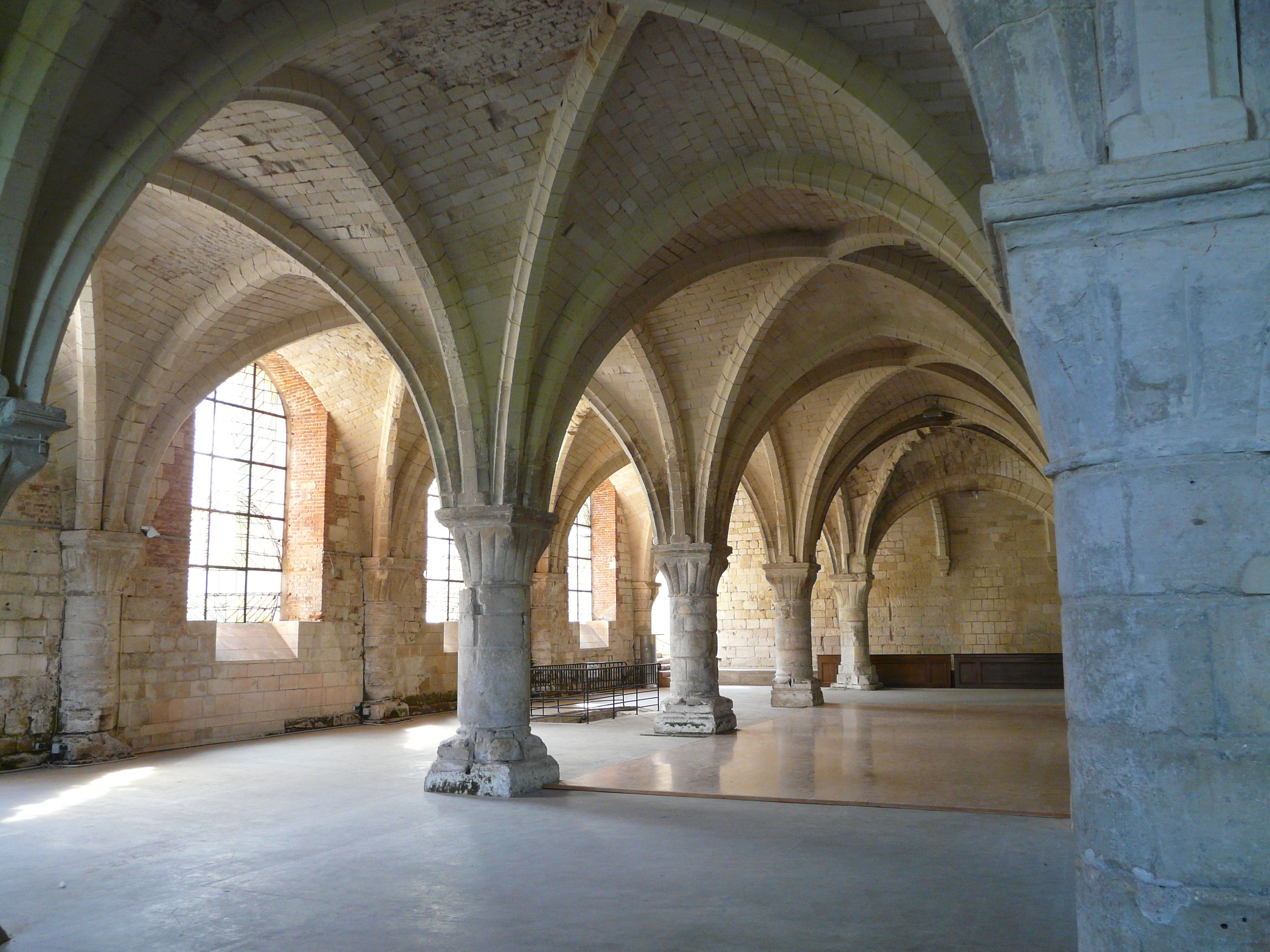
Chapter house of Vaucelles
