= Conon of Béthune =

French crusader

Conon de Béthune (before 1160 in the former region of Artois, today Pas-de-Calais - 17 December 1219, possibly at Adrianople) was a French crusader and trouvère poet who became a senior official and finally regent of the Latin Empire of Constantinople. Alternative spellings of his name include Cono, Coesnes, Quenes, Conain, and Quenon.

== Life ==
Probably born before 1160, he was the fifth son of Robert V de Béthune, hereditary Lord of Béthune and Advocate of the Abbey of Saint-Vaast at Arras in today's Pas-de-Calais, who died on the Third Crusade at the siege of Acre in 1191, and his wife Alice, daughter of Hugues III, Count of Saint-Pol. His four elder brothers were:

Robert VI de Béthune, who succeeded his father as Lord of Béthune and Advocate of Arras;
Guillaume II de Béthune, who succeeded his brother as Lord of Béthune and Advocate of Arras;
Baudouin de Béthune, Count of Aumale and companion of King Richard I of England; and
Jean de Béthune, Bishop and secular ruler of Cambrai.

Conon was educated by his cousin, the noted poet Hugues III d'Oisy, Castellan of Cambrai, who taught him the art of poetry. It is probable, from comments made in one of his poems, that Conon appeared before the French court at the occasion of the marriage of King Philippe Auguste with Isabelle of Hainaut in 1180 and sang his songs before Marie de Champagne, noted for her connection to the poet Chrétien de Troyes. He was however embarrassed, as he recorded wryly in the poem Mout me semont Amors ke je m'envoise, by his Artesian accent.

After having taken part in the Third Crusade to Palestine, Conon de Béthune went with his brother Guillaume on the Fourth Crusade in 1203, accompanying the knights of Baldwin, Count of Flanders and Hainaut. At the outset he was chosen as one of six knights to command all transport and supplies and when the army arrived at Constantinople he was appointed its spokesman in negotiations with the Byzantines. His rhetorical ability, wisdom and chivalry were praised by fellow Crusader Geoffroi de Villehardouin, who said of Conon: Bon chevalier et sage estoit et bien eloquens (A good knight and a wise one he was, and most eloquent).

After the diverted Crusade's capture of Constantinople in 1204, Conon held a number of important positions in the Latin Empire under Baldwin (now emperor Baldwin I), the successor to the Byzantine Empire established by the Crusaders and centered on Constantinople. Awarded the senior title of protovestiarius, inherited from the Byzantine court, sometime in 1205, he played a key role in Baldwin's reconciliation with Boniface of Montferrat before the Battle of Adrianople against the Bulgarians, in which Baldwin was captured and later put to death. In 1209, he supervised the signing of the Treaty of Sapienza on the emperor's behalf.

Conon then served Baldwin's brother emperor Henry of Flanders until his death in 1217, followed by Baldwin's sister Yolanda of Flanders, during which time he defended the city of Adrianople and was raised to the higher rank of sevastokrator. On the death of Yolanda in 1219, her son Robert of Courtenay became emperor but was far away in France. In his absence, the barons of the Empire elected Conon to serve as regent (baiulus) but he died shortly after.

== Landholdings ==
He had various lands in France, as seigneur or as tenant. He was seigneur of Bergues near Dunkirk in 1202 and also of two villages (Rulliacum and Camissiacum) where in that year he freed the inhabitants, almost certainly to raise funds for crusading. These holdings he left in the charge of his nephew, Robert VII, Lord of Béthune while he was away.

== Family ==
Though the name of his wife is unknown, a son is recorded: Conon de Béthune, called The Strong, who was alive in 1238. Another possible son, or nephew, Baldwin of Béthune, succeeded Theodore Branas as Lord of Adrianople; as the lordship was hereditary it is assumed that Baldwin married an otherwise unattested daughter of Branas. Baldwin also held the court title of Caesar, likewise adopted from Byzantine practice.. He died in 1227, in battle, against Theodore Komnenos Doukas army, who took Adrianople not long after.

== Poetry ==
Only 14 works of poetry attributed to Conon de Béthune have survived; one of these, only attributed in Trouvère MS C (Bern 389) is a jeu-parti in which Conon is neither of the named participants. A total of 17 manuscripts contain at least one of the remaining thirteen attributed works, but three of these have alternative attributions in more reliable sources, resulting in an accepted number of 10 songs. Conon's poetry was written to be sung and many of his poems survive with musical notation. The majority of his poems are courtly love songs, but two of them are chansons de croisade or crusade songs in which the poet-lover deplores his approaching departure from his beloved but nevertheless accepts the "noble calling" of crusader. Conon de Béthune also shows himself at times to be ironic or satirical, and in one of his crusade poems he rails with vehemence against financial abuses by those collecting funds for the crusaders. Some think he married Anne of Paris after composing a poem for her.

The ten works edited by Wallensköld (1968) as authentically by Conon are:

1. Chançon legiere a entendre
2. Si voiremant con cele don je chant
3. Mout me semont Amors que je m'envoise
4. Ahi! Amors, com dure departie
5. Bien me deüsse targier
6. Se raige et derverie
7. Belle doce Dame chiere
8. Tant ai amé c'or me convient haïr
9. L'autrier un jor aprés la Saint Denise
10. L'autrier avint en cel autre païs

== Sources ==
- Chisholm, Hugh, ed. (1911). "Béthune, Conon de" . Encyclopædia Britannica. Vol. 3 (11th ed.). Cambridge University Press.
- Hasenohr, Geneviève and Michel Zink, eds. Dictionnaire des lettres françaises: Le Moyen Age. Collection: La Pochothèque. Paris: Fayard, 1964.
- Rosenber, Samuel N.; Switten, margaret; Le Vot, Gérard (2013). Songs of the Troubadours and Trouveres: An Anthology of Poems and Melodies. Routledge. pp. 241–248. ISBN 9781134819140.
- Shawcross, Theresa (2012). "Conquest Legitimized: The Making of a Byzantine Emperor in Crusader Constantinople (1204–1261)". In Harris, Jonathan; Holmes, Catherine; Russell, Eugenia (eds.). Byzantines, Latins, and Turks in the Eastern Mediterranean World After 1150. Oxford: Oxford University Press. pp. 181–220. ISBN 978-0-19-964188-8.
- Van Tricht, Filip (2011). The Latin Renovatio of Byzantium: The Empire of Constantinople (1204-1228). Leiden: Brill. ISBN 978-90-04-20323-5.
- Van Tricht, F (2014) The Byzantino-Latin Principality of Adrianople and the Challenge of Feudalism (1204/6–ca.1227/28): Empire, Venice, and Local Autonomy, Dumbarton Oaks Papers, Vol. 68 (2014), pp. 325–342, Dumbarton Oaks, Trustees for Harvard University
