= House of Béthune =

Coat of arms of the Béthune family

The House of Bethune (French: Maison de Béthune pronounced [mɛzɔ̃ də betyn]) is a French noble house from the province of Artois in the north of France whose proven filiation dates back to Guillaume de Béthune who made his will in 1213. This family became extinct in 1807 with Maximilien-Alexandre de Béthune, Duke of Sully (1784-1807).

There are other families called de Bethune or Bethune, but their links with the house of Bethune are not proven. One of them, Béthune-Hesdigneul family, has the princely title since 1781, recognized both in France and Belgium.

== The original House of Béthune ==
=== Lords of Béthune and advocates of Arras ===
In 1639 André Du Chesne gave a lineage that went back to 1037, but the proven filiation dates back to Guillaume de Béthune called "Le Roux" who made his will in 1213 and died soon after.

- Robert I (died about 1037), called Faisseux, lord of Béthune, Richebourg and Carency and Advocate of Arras, was the first of the house of Bethune, said to be descended from the Counts of Artois.
- Robert II, lord of Béthune (died before 1075), elder son of Robert I.
- Robert III, lord of Béthune (died 1100), elder son of Robert II.
- Baudouin, younger son of Robert I, became Lord of Carency and founder of a separate branch.
- Robert IV, lord of Béthune (died 1128), son of Robert III
- Guillaume I, lord of Béthune (died 1138), son of Robert IV
- Robert V, lord of Béthune (died 1191), called Le Roux, was son of Guillaume I and died during the Third Crusade at Acre in Palestine.
- Robert VI, lord of Béthune (died 1194), eldest son of Robert V.
- Guillaume II, lord of Béthune (died 1213) (second son of Robert V according to André Du Chesne) married the heiress of Dendermonde.
- Daniel (died 1227), eldest son of Guillaume II.
- Robert VII (died 1249), second son of Guillaume II, died in Sardinia while on the Seventh Crusade.

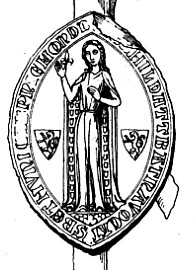
Seal of Mathilde

- Mathilde or Maud or Mahaut, daughter and heiress of Robert VII, married Guy, Count of Flanders and became mother of Robert III, Count of Flanders, known as Robert of Béthune. The principal honours and lands of the Béthune family went with Mathilde to the Counts of Flanders. A younger son of Guillaume II was Lord of Loker and his family later achieved prominence in France.

=== Younger sons ===
- Baudouin (died 1212), third son of Robert V, a close companion of King Richard I of England, he married Hawise of Aumale and thus became Count of Aumale.
- Jean (died 1219), fourth son of Robert V, was Bishop of Cambrai and died during the Albigensian Crusade at the assault on Toulouse.
- Conon (died 1219), fifth son of Robert V, a poet who served on the Fourth Crusade and settled at Adrianople, now Edirne, becoming Regent of the Latin Empire.
- Jean (died 1238), fifth son of Guillaume II, married Elizabeth, Countess of Saint-Pol (1228).

=== Béthune of Palestine and Cyprus ===
- Adam, son of Robert III, in 1099 went as a knight on the First Crusade with Robert II, Count of Flanders and was rewarded with the seigneurie of Bessan, now Beit She'an, in the Kingdom of Jerusalem. His family spread through Palestine and Cyprus, marrying other Frankish settlers as well as Armenians and Greeks.
- His descendant Richilde de Bessan married Baldwin of Ibelin and their daughter Eschive d'Ibelin married Aimery, King of Cyprus and of Jerusalem.

=== Béthune of Loker and Meaux ===
- Guillaume III (died 1243), a younger son of Guillaume II, was Lord of Loker and Meulebeke.
- Guillaume IV (died before 1255), a younger son of Guillaume III, was Lord of Loker and married the heiress of Hébuterne.
- Guillaume V, eldest son of Guillaume IV, was Lord of Loker, married Jeanne de Nesle, daughter of Jeanne, Countess of Ponthieu and Aumale and former Queen Consort of Castille and León.
- Guillaume VI (died 1340), son of Guillaume V, was Lord of Loker and Hébuterne, married the Lady of Vendeuil.
- Jean I (died 1378), younger son of Guillaume VI, was Lord of Vendeuil. He married Jeanne, daughter of Enguerrand VI, Lord of Coucy, Viscount of Meaux.
- Robert VIII (died 1408), elder son of Jean I, left three daughters as co-heiresses, among them Jeanne, Viscountess of Meaux, who looked after Joan of Arc during her captivity. The line was continued by his younger brother Jean II.

=== Béthune of Baye and Rosny ===
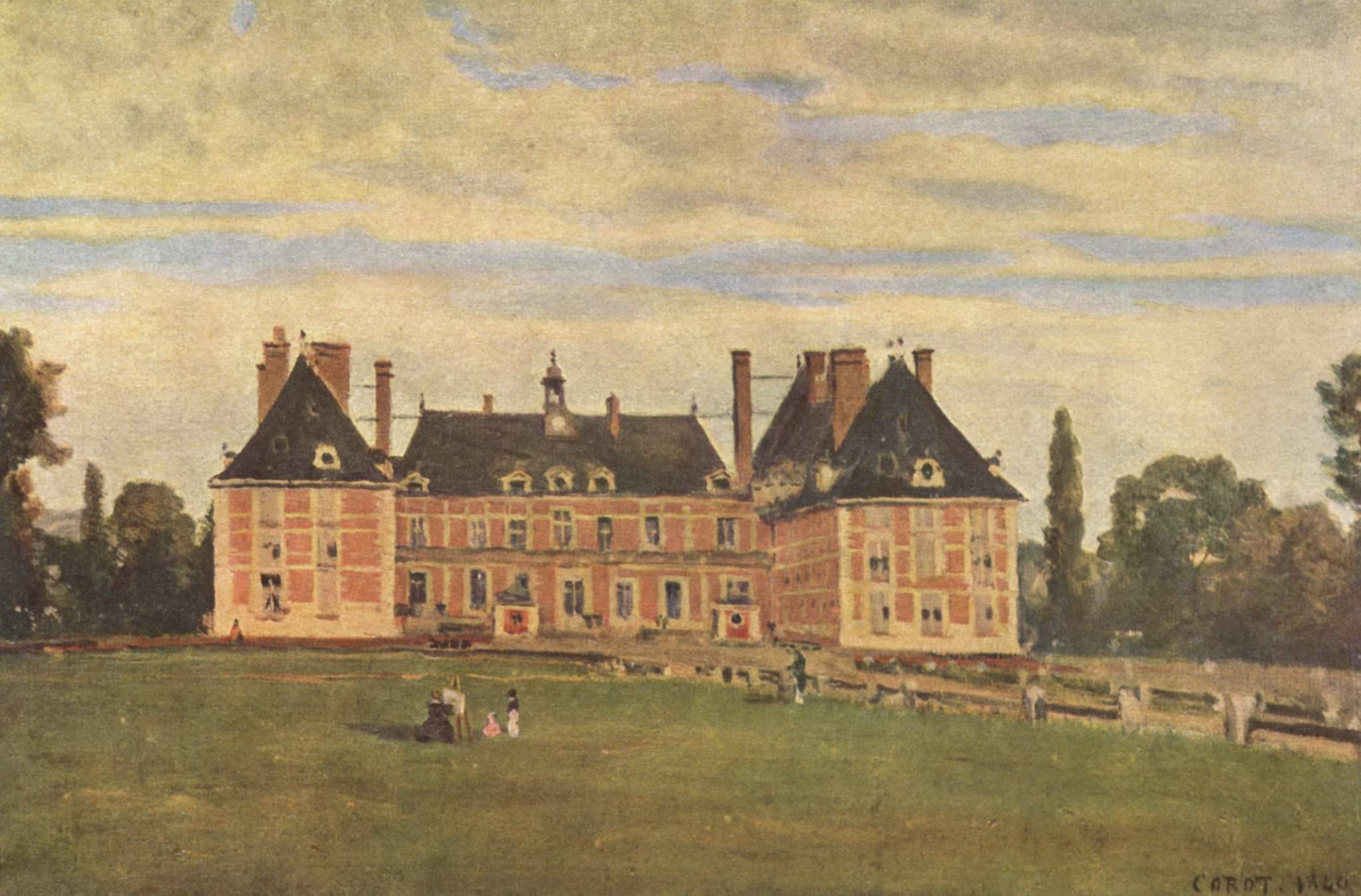
Castle of Rosny, by J B C Corot

- Jean II (died 1415 at the Battle of Agincourt), younger son of Jean I, was Lord of Mareuil and Baye.
- Robert IX (died before 1476), son of Jean II, Lord of Mareuil and Baye, was a Councillor and Chamberlain to King Charles VII of France.
- Jean III (died before 1512), son of Robert IX, was Lord of Mareuil and Baye.
- Alpin (died 1545), son of Jean III, became Baron of Baye and Mareuil.
- Jean IV (died about 1554), Baron of Baye, married Anne de Melun, who brought him the barony and castle of Rosny.
- François (1532–1575), son of Jean IV, was Baron of Rosny. His eldest son Louis died in 1578.

=== House of Sully ===
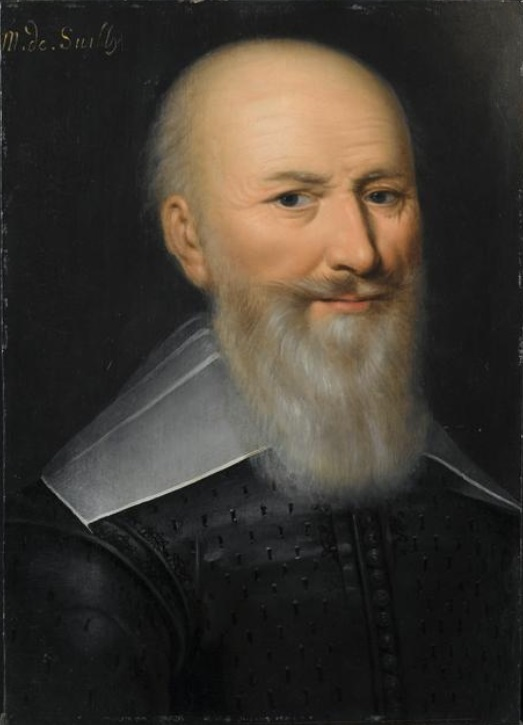
Maximilen de Béthune

=== Béthunes, Dukes of Sully ===
- Second son of François was Maximilien I (1559–1641), chief minister of King Henry IV of France, who was Baron of Rosny from 1578 and became a Peer of France on creation as 1st Duke of Sully in 1606. In 1602 he bought the Castle of Sully-sur-Loire and in 1605 the Principality of Boisbelle, where he founded the town of Henrichemont.

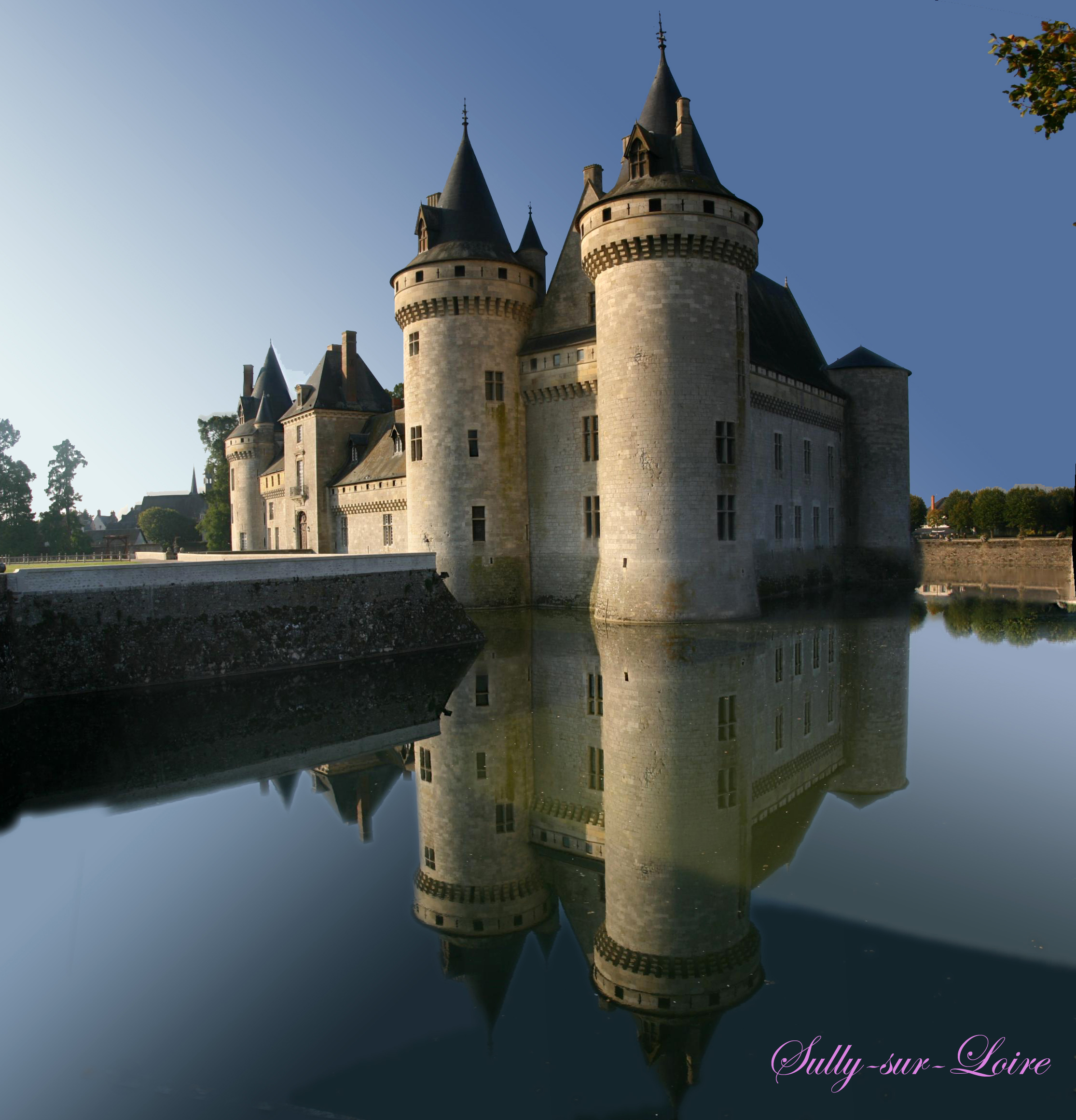
Castle of Sully

- Maximilien II (1588–1634), son of Maximilien I, was Marquess of Rosny, Prince of Henrichemont and Baron of Bontin.
- Maximilien François (1614–1661), son of Maximilien II, was 2nd Duke of Sully.
- Maximilien Pierre François (1640–1694), son of Maximilien François, was 3rd Duke of Sully.
- Maximilien François Pierre (1664–1712), elder son of Maximilien Pierre François, was 4th Duke of Sully.
- Maximilien Henri (1669–1729). younger son of Maximilien Pierre François, was 5th Duke of Sully.
- Louis Pierre Maximilien (1685–1751), third cousin of Maximilien Henri, was 6th Duke of Sully.
- Maximilien Antoine Armand (1730–1786), first cousin once removed of Louis Pierre Maximilien, was 7th Duke of Sully but called Duc de Béthune.
- Maximilien Alexis (1750–1776), elder son of Maximilien Antoine Armand, was 8th Duke of Sully.
- Maximilien Gabriel (1756–1807), younger son of Maximilien Antoine Armand, was 9th Duke of Sully
- Maximilien III (1784–1807), son of Maximilien Gabriel, was 10th and last Duke of Sully.

=== Béthune-Orval ===
- François (1598–1678), second son of Maximilien, 1st Duke of Sully, was created Duke of Orval and Peer of France by King Louis XIII but the grant was not registered and so could not pass to his heirs.
- Maximilien Alpin (1631–1692), eldest surviving son of François, was Marquess of Béthune and Count of Orval.
- Louis Pierre Maximilen (1685–1751), grandson of Maximilien Alpin, became 6th Duke of Sully (see above).

=== Béthune-Chârost ===
Arms of Philippe de Béthune

- Philippe (1566–1649), younger brother of Maximilien I, Count of Selles, Chârost and Mors, Marquess of Chabris, was a diplomat and art connoisseur who was made a cardinal.

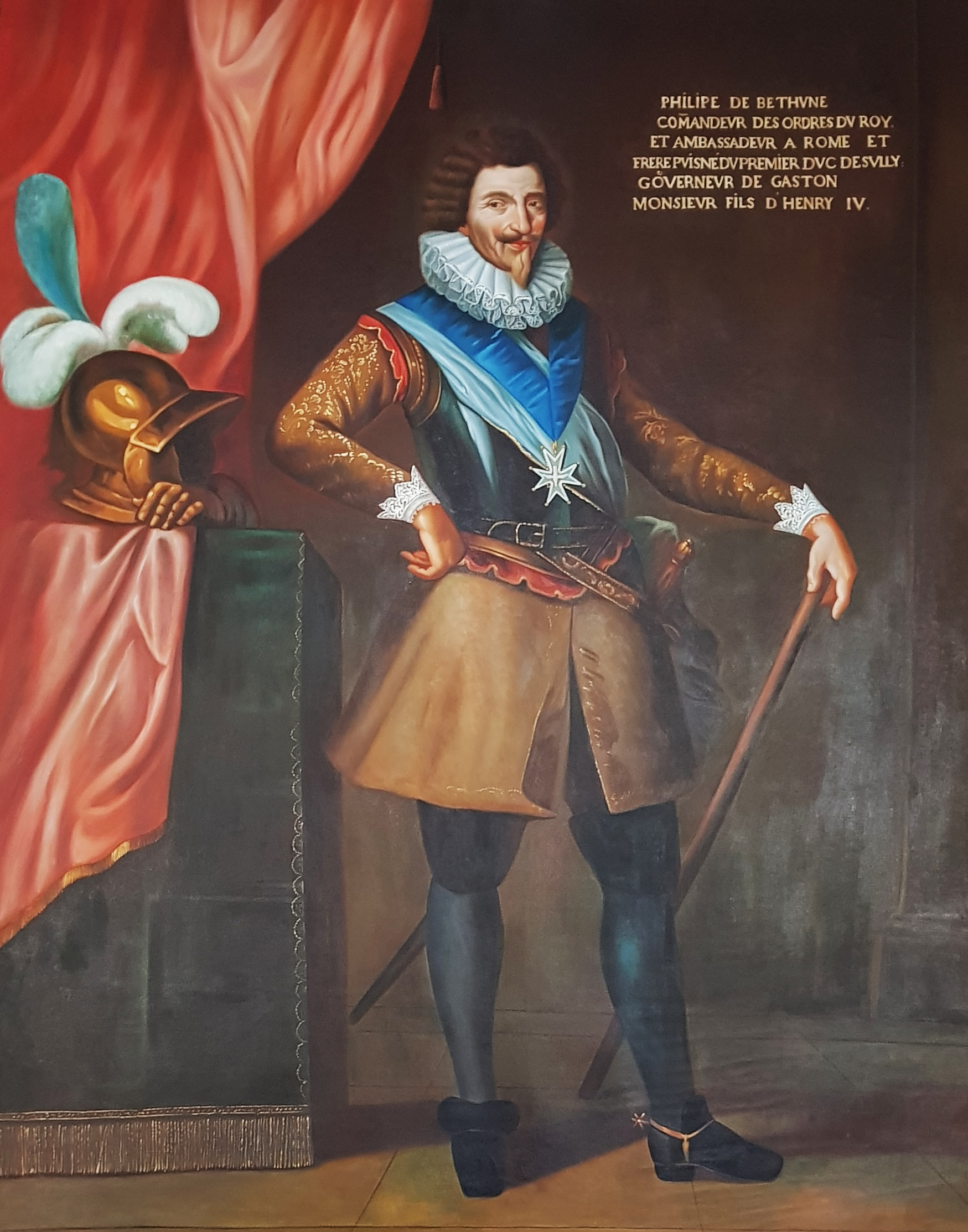
Philippe de Béthune

- Henri (1604–1680), second son of Philippe, was Bishop of Bayonne and of Maillezais from 1630, then Archbishop of Bordeaux from 1646.
- Louis (1605–1681), third son of Philippe, became 1st Duke of Chârost.
- Louis Armand (1640–1717), son of Louis, was 2nd Duke of Chârost.
- Armand I (1663–1741), son of Louis Armand, was 3rd Duke of Chârost and Baron of Ancenis.
- Paul François (1682–1757), son of Armand I, was 4th Duke of Chârost and 1st Duke of Ancenis.
- François Joseph (1719–1739), son of Paul François, was 5th Duke of Chârost and 2nd Duke of Ancenis.
- Armand II Joseph (1738–1800), son of François Joseph, was 6th and last Duke of Chârost and 3rd and last Duke of Ancenis, as well as the last inheritor to the title of Count of Roucy.

=== Béthune-Chabris ===
- Hippolyte I (1603–1665), eldest son of Philippe, was Marquess of Chabris and Count of Selles.
- Henri (1632–1690), second son of Hippolyte I, was Count of Selles.
- Armand (1635–1703), fourth son of Hippolyte I, was Bishop of Le Puy from 1661.
- Hippolyte II (1643–1720), sixth son of Hippolyte I, was Bishop of Verdun from 1681.
- Louis (1663–1734), son of Henri, was Count of Béthune.
- Louis Armand (1711–1792), son of Louis, was Marquess of Béthune.
- Armand Louis (1756–1833), son of Louis Armand, was the last Marquess of Béthune.

=== Béthune-Selles ===
- François Gaston (1638–1692), 5th son of Hippolyte I, Marquess of Chabris and a Lieutenant-General in the French army, married Marie Louise de La Grange, sister of the Queen Consort of Poland. Two daughters of François Gaston married important members of the Polish–Lithuanian aristocracy and have numerous descendants.
- Louis Marie Victor, son of François Gaston (1670–1744), Count of Béthune, was a Field Marshal in the French army and Grand Chamberlain to Stanislaus Leszczyński, former King of Poland, when he became Duke of Lorraine and Bar in 1737.
- Joachim Casimir Léon (1724–1769), son of Louis Marie Victor, a Field Marshal in the French army, was the last Count of Béthune.

=== Béthunes in Poland and Lithuania ===
- Jeanne Marie de Béthune (about 1673–1744), daughter of François Gaston, married Count Jan Stanislaw Jablonowski (1669–1731) and had five children, all of whom married.
- Marie Christine Cathérine de Béthune (1677–1721), daughter of François Gaston, was married first to Prince Stanisław Kazimierz Radziwiłł (1648–1690), without children, and then to Prince Aleksander Paweł Sapieha (1671–1734), leaving three married children.

== Bibliography ==
Chisholm, Hugh, ed. (1911). "Béthune (family)" . Encyclopædia Britannica. Vol. 3 (11th ed.). Cambridge University Press.

- (French) Anselme (Father) Histoire généalogique et chronologique de la maison royale de France, volume 4, 1868, pages 181-229 : Genealogy of the House of Béthune.
- Bethune, Sir Alexander Maitland Sharp, Baronet (1997). Fife Sharps and Bethunes. London.
- Burke, John (1836). A Genealogical and Heraldic History of the Commoners of Great Britain and Ireland Enjoying Territorial Possessions or High Official Rank but Uninvested with Heritable Honours. London.
- Burke, John, and Burke, John Bernard (1847). A Genealogical and Heraldic Dictionary of the Landed Gentry of Great Britain & Ireland. London.
- (French) Cayet, Pierre Victor Palma (1603). L'Oraison Funèbre du haut et puissant Monseigneur reverendissime l'Archevesque de Glasco, Melort James de Béthune. Paris.
- (French) Chaix d'Est-Ange, Gustave. Dictionnaire des familles françaises anciennes ou notables à la fin du XIXe siècle, tome 4, pages 195-196.
- Clark, James Toshach (1900). Genealogical Collections Concerning Families in Scotland Made by Walter Macfarlane 1750–1751. Edited from the Original Manuscripts in The Advocates' Library. Vol 1, Edinburgh.
- Conolly, M. F. (1866). Biographical Dictionary of Eminent Men of Fife, of Past ond Present Times, Natives of ihe County, or Connected with It by Property, Residence, Office, Marriage, or Otherwise. Edinburgh.
- (French) De La Chenaye-Desbois, François Alexandre (1771). Dictionnaire de la Noblesse, 2nd ed, vol 2. Paris.
- (French) De La Chenaye-Desbois, François Alexandre (1864). Dictionnaire de la Noblesse, 3rd ed, vol 3. Paris, Schlesinger.
- (French) Denele, Gilbert (2007). La Maison de Béthune http://www.amisdumusee-bethune.fr/bethune.html Archived 9 March 2016 at the Wayback Machine
- (French) Denele, Gilbert (2007). La Famille de Béthune: Généalogie de la Branche de Bessan http://www.amisdumusee-bethune.fr/bessan.html Archived 11 September 2016 at the Wayback Machine
- (French) Denele, Gilbert (2007). Les Béthune en Angleterre et en Écosse: Les Béthune de Balfour http://www.amisdumusee-bethune.fr/balfour.html Archived 10 September 2016 at the Wayback Machine
- (French) Denele, Gilbert (2009). Conon de Béthune
- (French) Du Chesne, André (1639). Histoire Généalogique de la Maison de Béthune. Paris.
- (French) d'Ursel, Comte Baudouin (2009). Princes de Béthune-Hesdigneul http://www.amisdumusee-bethune.fr/bethune-hesdigneul.html Archived 11 September 2016 at the Wayback Machine
- Farrer, William (1923) Honors and knights' fees : an attempt to identify the component parts of certain honors and to trace the descent of the tenants of the same who held by knight's service or serjeanty from the eleventh to the fourteenth century. Vol 3 London, Spottiswoode, Ballantyne & Co.
- Gordon, John (editor) (1845). The New Statistical Account of Scotland, Volume 9: Fife & Kinross. The Society for the Benefit of the Sons and Daughters of the Clergy.
- Lennox, Charlotte (translator) (1756).Memoirs of Maximilian de Béthune, duke of Sully, prime minister to Henry the Great. Containing the history of the life and reign of that monarch, and his own administration under him, Vol 1. London.
- Lyell, James Patrick Ronaldson (1894), in Hallen, Reverend A W Cornelius, editor The Scottish Antiquary, or Northern Notes & Queries, Vol 8. Edinburgh.
- MacGeorge, Andrew (1834). Miscellaneous Papers Principally Illustrative of Events in the Reigns of Queen Mary and King James VI Presented to the Maitland Club. Edinburgh.
- (French) Moréri, Louis (1731). Le Grand Dictionnaire Historique. Basel.
- (German) Schwennicke, Reverend Detlev (1979). Europäische Stammtafeln, Band VII, Tafel 57–61. Frankfurt am Main, Vittorio Klostermann.
- Weisse, Jane Lee Hunt (1866). Records, Genealogical Charts, and Traditions of the Families of Bethune and Faneuil from Authentic Documents including Records of the Families of Hunt and Weisse. New York.
- Whyte, Reverend Thomas (1778). An Historical and Genealogical Account of the Bethunes of the Island of Sky. Edinburgh.
- Wood, Reverend Walter (1862). The East Neuk of Fife: History And Antiquities, Geology, Botany, And Natural History In General. Edinburgh.
- Wood, Reverend Walter, and Wood Brown, Reverend James (1887). The East Neuk of Fife Its History and Antiquities. Edinburgh.
