= Hugh IV of Saint-Pol =

Hugh IV of Saint-Pol (died March 1205 in Constantinople) from the House of Campdavaine, son of Anselm of Saint-Pol, was count of Saint-Pol from 1174 to his death, and lord of Demotika (Didymoteicho) in Thrace in 1204–05. He participated in the Third and Fourth Crusades.

== Life ==
He participated with Philip I, Count of Flanders, in the Third Crusade where he distinguished himself in the siege of Acre in 1191.

In 1194 he received from Philip II of France the lands of Pont-Sainte-Maxence, Verneuil and Pontpoint, because of his service.

In 1200 he enlisted in the Fourth Crusade, where his prior service and rank made him among the leading non-Venetian nobles: he came fourth after Boniface of Montferrat, Baldwin of Flanders, and Louis of Blois. He participated in the conquest of Constantinople on April 12, 1204. In an attempt to curb the pillaging of the city, he hanged one of his own knights. Hugh received the sword of constable by the new Latin Emperor, Baldwin of Flanders, who also gave him the fortress of Demotika in Thrace.

He died of gout in March 1205. He received a funeral in Constantinople and his body was brought to France where he was buried in the Abbey of Cercamps.

== Marriage and issue ==
Hugh was married to Yolande, daughter of Baldwin IV, Count of Hainaut. Hugh and Yolande had two daughters:

- Elizabeth (1179–1240), married first to Walter III, Seigneur de Châtillon-sur-Marne, and second to Jean de Béthune
- Eustache (1180–1241), married to John de Nesle, Châtelain of Bruges (see House of Nesle).

== Sources ==
- Andrea, Alfred J. (2008). "Count Hugh of Saint Pol's Report to the West". Contemporary Sources for the Fourth Crusade: Revised Edition. BRILL. pp. 177–201. ISBN 978-9004169432.
- Evergates, Theodore (2007). The Aristocracy in the County of Champagne, 1100-1300. University of Pennsylvania Press.
- Lester, Anne E. (2018). "From Captivity to Liberation: the Ideology and Practice of Franchise in Crusading France". In Van Houts, Elisabeth (ed.). Anglo-Norman Studies. Vol. XL: Proceedings of the Battle Conference 2017. The Boydell Press. pp. 147–164.
- Lock, Peter (1995). The Franks in the Aegean, 1204-1500. Longman Group Limited.
- Sturm-Maddox, Sara (2000). "Arthurian Evasions: The End(s) of Fiction in Floriant et Florete". In Busby, Keith; Jones, Catherine M. (eds.). Por Le Soie Amisté: Essays in Honor of Norris J. Lacy. Rodopi.

Preceded by Anselm of Saint-Pol	Count of Saint-Pol; 1174–1205	Succeeded by Walter III of Châtillon
