= Château de Troissy =

Former castle in Marne, France

Coordinates: 49°04′53″N 3°42′32″E

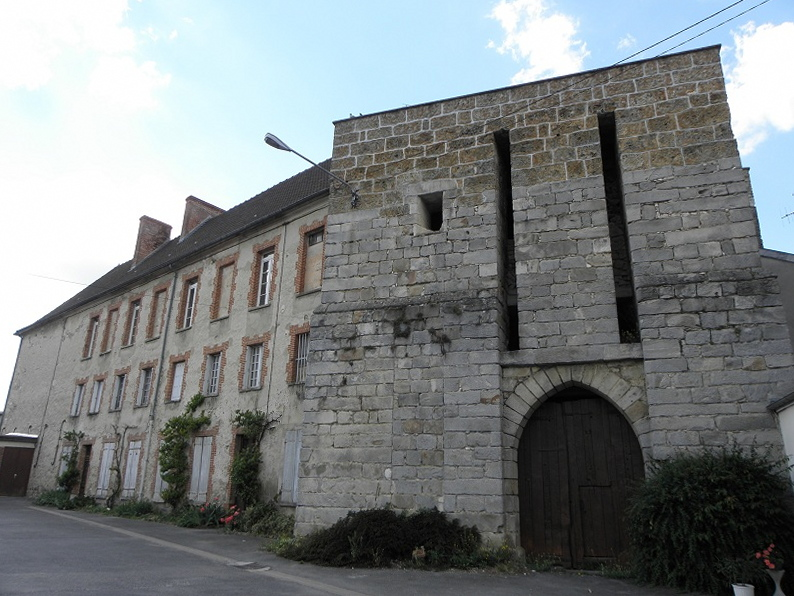
Château de Troissy

The Château de Troissy is a former castle in the commune of Troissy in the Marne département of France. It dates from the 12th century.

== Description ==
An 1855 meeting of the Sociéte Française pour la Conservation des Monuments Historiques heard a description of the castle. The remains consisted of single tower and a double ogival or pointed arched doorway and were dated to the 14th century. The square tower is built of sandstone and is wider in the lower half. Crenellation at the top is evidence of its military function. The outer doorway has two indented grooves to house the beams of a drawbridge; inside is a slot for the portcullis.

The castle's crypt has been classified since 1924 as a monument historique by the French Ministry of Culture.

== See also ==
- List of castles in France
