= Elizabeth, Countess of Saint-Pol =

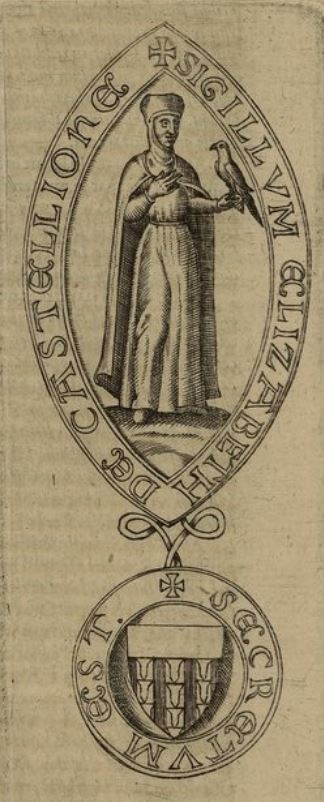
Elizabeth's first seal, used from 1196 to 1206, calls her Elizabeth of Châtillon and depicts her with a hunting falcon

Elizabeth, in French Élisabeth Candavène (c. 1180 – 1240/1247), was the countess of Saint-Pol from 1205 until her death, although her effective rule was limited to the periods 1219–1222 and 1226–1227. The rest of the time the county was ruled by her first husband and by her sons. From 1196 to 1219, she was married to Lord Gaucher III of Châtillon. From 1228 until 1238, she was married to the landless John of Béthune. She was a patroness of the Cistercians.

Elizabeth is not mentioned in any surviving chronicle. Her life can be traced only through the documentary record. For the period after the death of her first husband, that consists primarily of 39 preserved charters issued by her between 1219 and 1240.

== Heiress ==
Elizabeth belonged to the Candavène lineage, the eldest child of Count Hugh IV of Saint-Pol and Yolanda, daughter of Baldwin IV, Count of Hainaut. She was born not long after their marriage in 1179 and was named after her older cousin, Isabella of Hainault, who had been betrothed to King Philip II of France. The spelling Isabella (or Ysabella, Isabel, etc.) represented the vernacular pronunciation of the name. Elizabeth sometimes appears as Isabel(la), especially after 1228. She had a younger sister named Eustachie.

The earliest surviving source that mentions Elizabeth is an agreement made by Hugh and Yolanda with a local priory in 1190 in preparation for Hugh's participation in the Third Crusade. Hugh and Yolanda refer in the agreement to the consent of their daughters. That same year, Hugh enfeoffed a vassal "with the assent and will of Elizabeth, our daughter", implying clearly that she was his heir. Besides the county of Saint-Pol, she would also inherit his fiefs in England.

Although only about ten years old, Elizabeth continued to be associated with her mother's regency. She and Eustachie witnessed a charter of 1190 in their father's absence. She witnessed another in October 1193, after her father's return.

== Marriage to Gaucher of Châtillon ==
In 1196, aged about sixteen, Elizabeth married Gaucher III of the House of Châtillon, who was lord of Châtillon-sur-Marne, Crécy-en-Brie, Montjay-la-Tour and Pierrefonds in the Champagne. This marriage represented a shift in strategy for the Candavènes, who had usually looked north (as to Hainault) for marriage alliances. The Châtillons were close allies of the king, however, and Elizabeth's marriage represents recognition of the rising power of the crown under Philip II. After her marriage, in the usual fashion of noblewomen of that era, Elizabeth took her husband's toponymic as her surname, calling herself Elizabeth of Châtillon (in Latin Elisabeth or Elizabeth de Castellione).

Elizabeth had a seal made for herself as lady of Châtillon. Although no documents issued by her are known from before 1205, she witnessed and affixed her seal to several acts of husband, including one in 1196 in favour of Sainte-Geneviève de Paris, another of 1204 for Notre-Dame de Paris and one in January 1205 for Saint-Denis.

In March 1202, Elizabeth returned to Saint-Pol to witness her father's charters as he prepared to leave on the Fourth Crusade. Her husband accompanied her and also witnessed the documents. After Hugh IV died while on crusade, Yolanda retired to her dower estates of Encre and Bucquoy and handed over the county to Gaucher in right of his wife. Although legally countess, Elizabeth did not exercise power in Saint-Pol at this time. She witnessed and sealed only 14 of her husband's 27 charters for Saint-Pol, although when she did it was usually as co-issuer. Her only known act entirely independent of her husband during their marriage was her request to Pope Honorius III to be allowed to hear Mass even though her county was under interdict. Honorius granted a dispensation because the interdict was imposed through no fault of hers.

== Quarrel with Guy ==
Elizabeth and Gaucher had two sons, Guy II and Hugh, and a daughter named Eustachie. Guy and Hugh were adults when Gaucher died in 1219. The succession plan entailed Hugh succeeding to Gaucher's fiefs in the Champagne and Guy succeeding to the county of Saint-Pol. This plan placed Guy's interests at odds with his mother's since she was still living when Gaucher died.

Guy and Hugh were with their mother when she issued her first charter for her Champenois dower lands in Brugny and Troissy in September 1219. They were not present when she issued her first charter for her inherited county of Saint-Pol in the spring of 1220. Hugh remained in Champagne, but Guy travelled to Saint-Pol, where he confirmed with his seal Elizabeth's settlement of a land dispute in July 1220. Other than this solitary act, Elizabeth's government in Saint-Pol in the years 1220–1222, which was more active than that of her husband, did not involve her sons.

The partition of the inheritance was not practical. Almost immediately there was dissension between Elizabeth and Guy. In February 1220, in a letter to King Henry III of England, Guy spoke of a "grievance" (Latin querela) against his mother over her entire inheritance, including her dower, lands she had acquired and her English fiefs. In a separate letter to the English regent Hubert de Burgh, written in late 1219 or early 1220, Elizabeth asked the regent to ignore any message sent from her son and to remit her fiefs' revenues to her. Nonetheless, a document in the Pipe Roll dated 9 February 1220 informs the sheriffs of Essex and Kent that Guy had paid relief for the estates left him by his mother "of her own free will", an indication that Guy's messengers had prevailed.

== Debts and loss of power ==
In 1222–1223, Elizabeth was progressively forced to give up most of her comital powers to cover her financial obligations. The nature and source of these obligations are unknown. Possibly her debts arose from the destitution of comital finances by the crusades of her father and husband (who took part in the Albigensian Crusades of 1209 and 1219); from the loss of the generous dower left to Yolanda; or from relief payments demanded by Philip II upon her accession. Her eldest son's ties to the crown through his father paid off and he acquired power at his mother's expense with royal help.

In October 1222, Elizabeth, facing a debt of 3,200 pounds of Paris, was forced to come to an agreement with Guy. Her son agreed to cover her existing debts and she agreed to contract no more debts for two years with her total debt not exceeding 1,000 pounds after that. For his help, Guy received half of the judicial revenues of the county of Saint-Pol for eight years, the right of usufruct on Elizabeth's dower for eight years and the right of succession to the castellany of Encre when his grandmother died. For the usufruct on her dowry, Elizabeth was to receive an annual 200 pounds of Provins from Guy. She remained countess and was responsible for the royal service (servitium regis) owed by the county, but she was forced to give up her seal to the keeping of Robert II of Boves. This arrangement between Elizabeth and Guy was authorized by King Philip and his son, the future Louis VIII, who as count of Artois was the immediate feudal superior of Saint-Pol.

By early 1223, Elizabeth's debts had ballooned to 8,000 pounds. It is not known to whom or for what she owed the money. The sudden appearance of an 8,000-pound debt is best explained by demand from Philip II for payment of an exorbitant relief. Such a high amount exceeded that demanded even from the counts of Boulogne, Nevers, Dammartin and Blois. The timing of the demand suggests that the relief was for the castellany of Encre, which Elizabeth inherited on the death of her mother on 4 March 1223. Encre was a direct fief of the crown, having formerly been part of the county of Vermandois. Elizabeth was in control of the other part of her mother's dower, Bucquoy, by May 1223.

In May 1223, Guy agreed to take on the 8,000-pound debt in exchange for "the whole county of Saint-Pol and all here land wherever she has it", including her revenues and rights of justice, for a period of ten years. While 1222 agreement was expressed in a charter issued by Elizabeth, she was marginalized in the 1223 agreement, which comprised a series of three acts (conventiones) issued by Guy, Philip and Louis. In his, Guy specified that if he should die before the ten years' was up, his rights would be inherited by whomever he named.

== Guy and Hugh's regency ==
During the three years of his de facto rule in Saint-Pol, Guy did not take the title of count, preferring to call himself "firstborn of the count[ess]" or "heir of the county". All that was left to Elizabeth under the agreement of 1223 was the villa and newly constructed castle of Frévent, a pension of 600 pounds and the right to hunt and fish in Lucheux. She remained legally the countess of Saint-Pol and as such received the homage of the county's vassals and sat with the peers of Artois when they acted as a court.

In 1224, Elizabeth confirmed the donation of a vassal to the abbey of Valloires. She received ten pounds of Paris for sealing the act, but her son's bailiff received fifteen. This is her only known act from the period 1223–1225. When Guy began preparing to leave on the Albigensian Crusade in 1226, however, he returned a measure of power to Elizabeth. On 1 January 1226, she restored the priory of Œuf-en-Ternois to the abbey of Marmoutier. In March, she approved a gift of alms to the Cistercian abbey of Cercamp, located within the bounds of Frévent. In May 1226, the lord Heuchin, while preparing to follow Guy on the "Albigensian way", made a donation to the abbey of Saint-Bertin without having time to procure Elizabeth's approval. In the charter of donation, he assumed any consequences of this omission, indicating that Elizabeth's feudal prerogatives were still respected.

Guy died on crusade at the siege of Avignon in August 1226. Elizabeth recovered her prerogatives as a countess. She issued a charter as such in September. In February 1227, she identified herself by both her husband's name and her hereditary title—"Elizabeth of Chatillon, countess of Saint-Pol"—perhaps to stress her position as family matriarch when Guy had left behind two young children, Yolanda and Gaucher. Elizabeth's second son soon pressed a claim to Guy's rights in Saint-Pol, presumably in accordance with Guy's wishes. By the following summer, Elizabeth and Hugh had reached an agreement on the government of Saint-Pol. The documents, however, do not survive. The agreement is known only from a record of an oath taken by Hugh. In July 1227, Hugh swore before the burgers of Saint-Pol-sur-Ternoise to respect the commune's rights "for how long my term lasts from the conventions that I have with my dearest mother". The new convention was presumably identical to that of 1223.

== Second marriage and barons' revolt ==
In 1228, probably after June, Elizabeth married John, a younger son of the House of Béthune who had followed a military career and possessed neither land nor money. His brother Daniel, lord of Béthune, was the first husband of Elizabeth's daughter. Shortly after her second marriage, Elizabeth wrote to the abbot of Anchin, from whom she held a small fief, asking him to receive homage from John "whom I legally married". The marriage does not have the appearance of a love match and, with Elizabeth beyond childbearing, was probably part of larger web of alliances.

The marriage took place during a rebellion against Blanche of Castile, widow of Louis VIII and regent for her son, Louis IX. It was likely arranged by Ferdinand, Count of Flanders, one of Blanche's supporters and John of Béthune's former employer, in order to shore up his southern flank against Count Philip I of Boulogne. In December 1226, Blanche had transferred the homage owed by Saint-Pol to the crown—which had been acquired in 1211 when Philip II confiscated the county of Boulogne from Renaud of Dammartin—back to Boulogne, but the count had turned against her.

Hugh, who followed his new suzerain against Blanche, opposed his mother's second marriage and sought to have it annulled. He charged his ally, Enguerrand III of Coucy, to bring the case before the bishop of Tournai and the archbishop of Reims in November 1228 as a third party. Although the marriage was within prohibited degree of kinship, Hugh's efforts failed to overturn it. In December, however, he began styling himself Count of Saint-Pol, dropping the more technically correct form "son of the count" that he had been using.

As part of his alliance with Elizabeth, Ferdinand gave her an annuity of 40 pounds of Artois from the revenue of the fair of Torhout, which she gave to the abbey of Cîteaux in July 1231. In 1229, Ferdinand ravaged the county of Saint-Pol "as far as the castle of Frévent", Elizabeth's residence, according to the chronicler William of Andres, who adds that his goal was to "disinherit" Hugh of Châtillon. The chronicler does not say that he intended to restore Elizabeth to her full powers, although it would have been the natural outcome. The broader purpose of his campaign was to relieve the pressure on his ally, Count Theobald IV of Champagne. He was defeated, and in September 1230 Blanche ordered the raids to cease. By the end of the year the warring factions had made peace, recognizing Louis IX as king with Blanche as regent. Hugh was in control of the county and Elizabeth was restricted to Frévent and Encre.

== Cession of Encre and final years ==
At some point after the rebellion, Elizabeth ceded Encre to Hugh. This is known from an annotation in a 13th-century necrology of the abbey of Corbie, to which the castellans of Encre owed homage as advocates for a few scattered estates. According to the confused note, Hugh wanted to be relieved of the homage owed to Corbie (perhaps by transferring the advocacies to the crown) and at one point complained that "his mother had a fickle will", an indication that his acquisition of Encre had probably not been smooth. In April 1233 or 1234, Hugh did homage to Louis IX for all the lands held from the king by "my dearest mother, Elizabeth" and John "who was called her husband", save whatever rights John may have had. Evidently, he still rejected the legality of his mother's second marriage. With this act, Elizabeth lost Encre and the last vestige of her political power.

Elizabeth spent her last years at Frévent, patronizing religious houses, particularly nearby Cercamp. Acts in favour of Cercamp survive from May, July and December 1234; April 1234 or 1235; January 1235; February, March and December 1240. The last is her last known act. She previously financed the construction new buildings at Cercamp in June–July 1228. She also made acts in favour of the priory of Framecourt in 1238. She managed her estate without interference from either her son or her husband, who died abroad in 1238.

Elizabeth's death between 1240 and 1247 cannot be precisely dated. She was buried in Cercamp alongside her ancestors.

== Bibliography ==
- Clarke, Peter D. (2007). The Interdict in the Thirteenth Century: A Question of Collective Guilt. Cambridge University Press.
- Evergates, Theodore (2007). The Aristocracy in the County of Champagne, 1100–1300. University of Pennsylvania Press.
- Nieus, Jean-François (2012). "Élisabeth Candavène, comtesse de Saint-Pol (†1240/47): une héritière face à la Couronne". In Éric Bousmar; Jonathan Dumont; Alain Marchandisse; Bertrand Schnerb (eds.). Femmes de pouvoir, femmes politiques durant les derniers siècles du Moyen Âge et au cours de la première Renaissance. De Boeck. pp. 185–211.
