= Nanteuil-la-Fosse =

- Commune
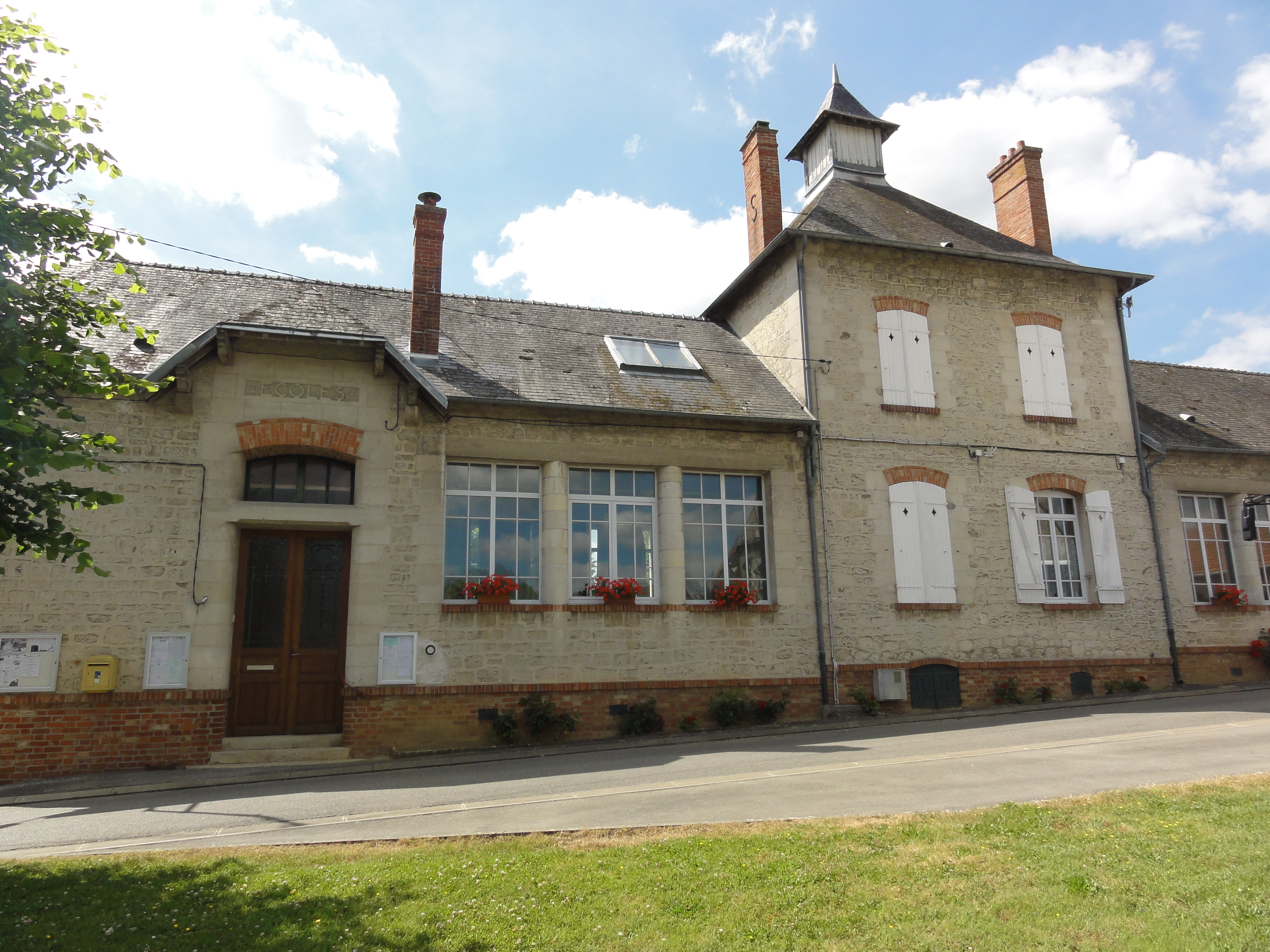
- The town hall and school of Nanteuil-la-Fosse
- Location of Nanteuil-la-Fosse
- Location within France Location within Hauts-de-France
- Coordinates: 49°26′11″N 3°27′15″E
- Country: France
- Region: Hauts-de-France
- Department: Aisne
- Arrondissement: Soissons
- Canton: Fère-en-Tardenois
- Intercommunality: Val de l'Aisne

Government
  - Mayor (2026–32): Pascal Charpentier
- Area^{1}: 7.36 km^{2} (2.84 sq mi)
- Elevation: 70 m (230 ft)
- Highest elevation: 176 m (577 ft)
- Lowest elevation: 79 m (259 ft)
- Population (2023): 186
  - Density: 25.3/km^{2} (65.5/sq mi)
- Time zone: UTC+01:00 (CET)
  - Summer (DST): UTC+02:00 (CEST)
- INSEE/Postal code: 02537 /02880
- ^{1} French Land Register data, which excludes lakes, ponds, glaciers > 1 km^{2} (0.386 sq mi or 247 acres) and river estuaries.

Nanteuil-la-Fosse (French pronunciation: [nɑ̃tœj la fos]) is a commune in the Aisne department in Hauts-de-France in northern France.

== Population ==
Historical population
Year	Pop.	±% p.a.
1968	219	—
1975	159	−4.47%
1982	155	−0.36%
1990	147	−0.66%
1999	134	−1.02%
2007	139	+0.46%
2012	166	+3.61%
2017	193	+3.06%
2023	186	−0.61%
Source: INSEE

== See also ==
- Communes of the Aisne department
