= Walter III of Châtillon =

French feudatory (1191-1219)

- Lord of Châtillon
- Reign: 1191–1219
- Predecessor: Guy III of Châtillon
- Successor: Guy IV of Châtillon-Saint-Pol; Hugh of Châtillon-Saint-Pol
- Other titles: Butler of Champagne; Seneschal of Burgundy
- Born: c. 1166
- Died: October 1219
- Noble family: House of Châtillon
- Spouse: Elisabeth of Saint-Pol
- Issue: Guy IV of Châtillon-Saint-Pol; Hugh of Châtillon-Saint-Pol; Béatrix de Châtillon-Saint-Pol; Eustachia de Châtillon-Saint-Pol
- Father: Guy II of Châtillon
- Mother: Adèle of Dreux

Walter III of Châtillon (French: Gaucher III de Châtillon ; Latin: Gualcherius de Castellione) was a French knight and Lord of Châtillon, Montjay, Troissy, Crécy et Pierrefonds until his death in 1219. With his marriage, he became Count of Saint-Pol. He was also the Butler of Champagne and the Seneschal of Burgundy.

== Biography ==
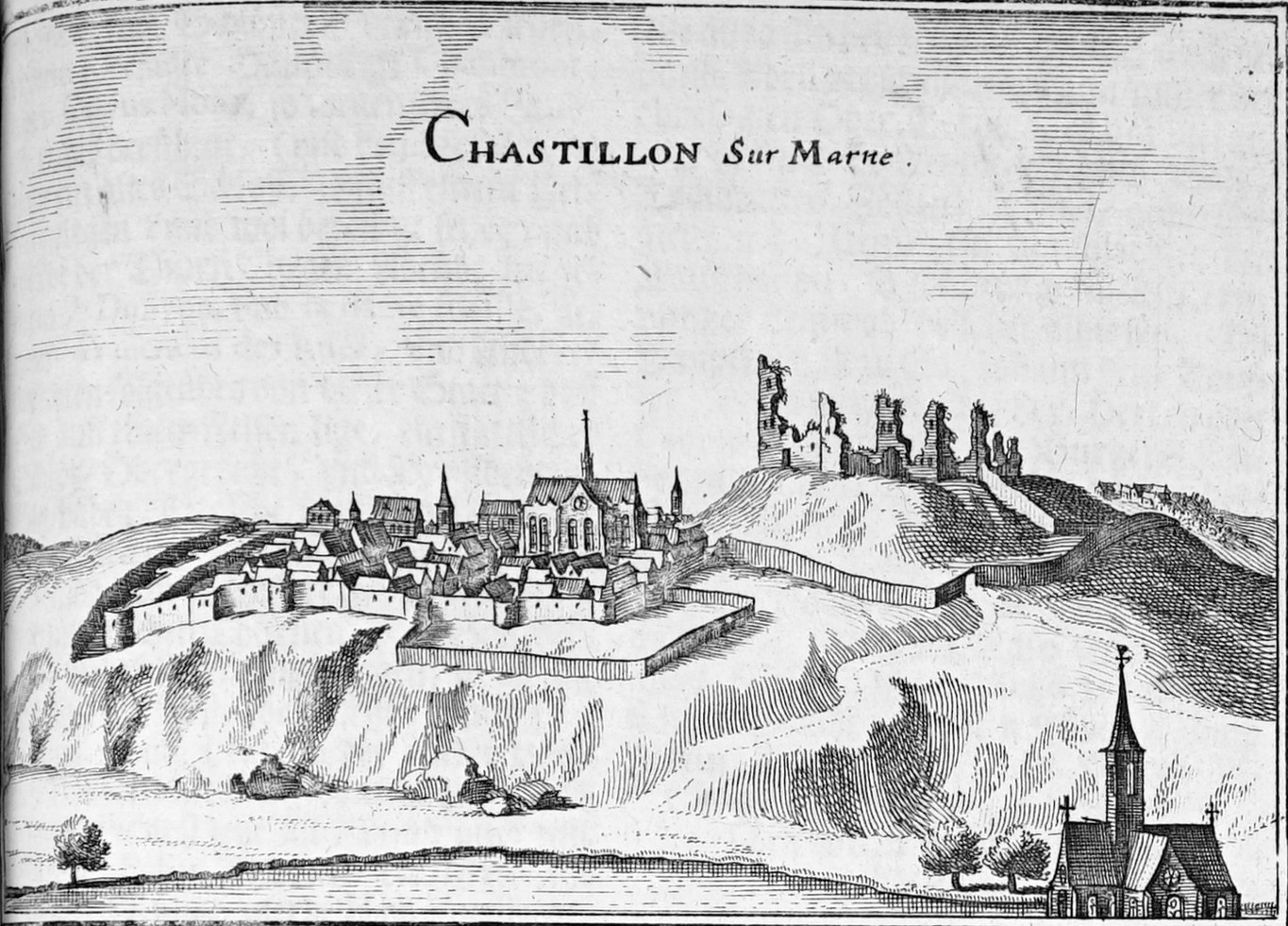
Old view of Châtillon, with castle's ruins, remparts and priory of Binson.

Walter was the second son of Guy II of Châtillon and Adèle of Dreux. After his father's death in 1170, his eldest brother became Lord of Châtillon and Walter assist him in his functions while his youngest brother, Robert of Châtillon, do an ecclesiastical career and became bishop of Laon in 1210 until his death in 1215.

In 1189, Walter and his eldest brother Guy participated in the Third Crusade and arrived at the siege of Acre with the King Philip Augustus the 30 March 1191, but Guy died during the fight and Walter became the new Lord of Châtillon. After the fall of the city and the departure of the French King, he stayed in Holy Land and fought in the battle of Arsuf and the battle of Jaffa. He probably left the Crusade for Châtillon in late 1192.

After being noticed for his war abilities during this Crusade, he was named Butler of Champagne then Seneschal of Burgundy in 1196.

In 1196, Walter married Elisabeth of Saint-Pol, daughter and heiress of Hugh IV of Campdavaine, Count of Saint-Pol, and his wife Yolande of Hainaut, and in 1205 he succeeded his father-in-law as count of Saint-Pol. With his wife, he founded a new town named Villeneuve-le-Comte in the forest of Crécy-la-Chapelle.

In 1203, he joined the French army with the duke Odo III of Burgundy and the constable of Champagne Guy II of Dampierre in the conquest of Normandy against the English King John Lackland. He fought in the Siege of Château Gaillard and the catch of Falaise, Caen, Bayeux and Rouen.

In 1209, he participated in the initial campaign of the Albigensian Crusade and fought at the siege of Béziers then Carcassonne. His abilities attracted the king's attention who gave him an army to fight against the English King in Brittany.

In 1213, he fought again for Philip Augustus in Flanders and Hainaut and took for him the city of Tournai and Mortagne. Before the battle of Bouvines the 27 July 1214, several French Lord doubted his loyalty and he answered that on that day the king would find in him a good traitor. During the battle, he charged and crossed enemy ranks several times, causing many trouble.In the chronicle of William the Breton he is said to have struck down all in his path and cut a hole through the enemy line. Considering he was a veteran at this point it is not surprising that he fought with distinction. According to William the Breton he withdrew to rest after fighting a long time but saw one of his knights being attacked and rode in to save him suffering from being struck by 12 lances but probably protected by his armor he fought on. He would go on to achieve legend status through poems about his works being written 40 years after his death by the Minstrel of Reims.

During the war of the Succession of Champagne, he supported the Countess-Regent Blanche of Navarre and her son Theobald against the pretender Erard of Brienne-Ramerupt and his wife Philippa of Champagne.

In 1219, he took the cross for the third time of his life and was back at Albigensian Crusade. He fought at sieges of Marmande and Toulouse. He died November 1219.

William the Breton, a contemporary chronicler of Walter, described him as the bravest in arms of his time.

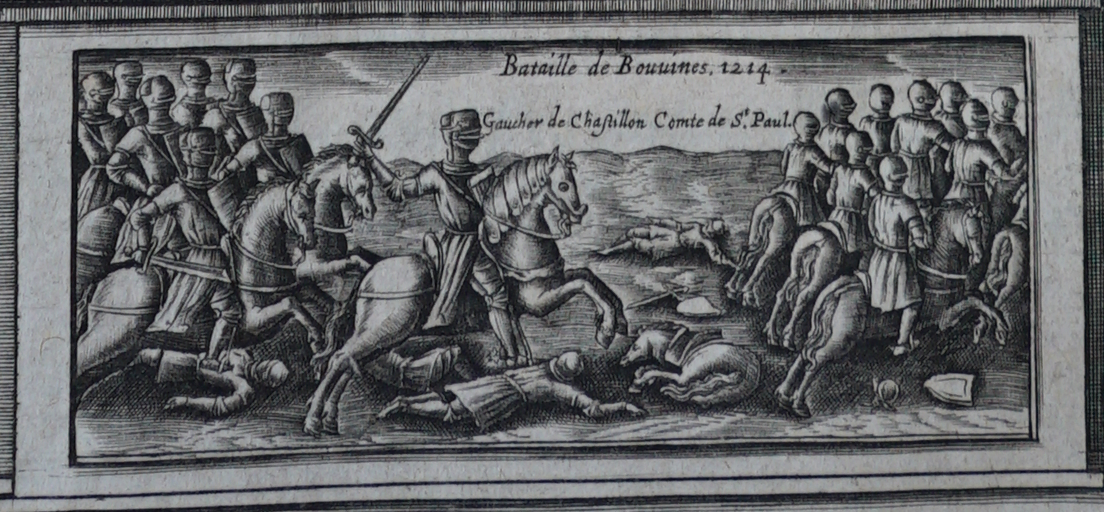
Walter III of Châtillon at the battle of Bouvines.

== Marriage and issue ==
In the year 1196 Walter married Elisabeth of Saint-Pol, daughter of Hugh IV of Campdavaine, Count of Saint-Pol, and Yolande of Hainaut, and had:

- Guy IV of Châtillon-Saint-Pol, Count of Saint-Pol after his father's death.
- Hugh of Châtillon-Saint-Pol, Lord of Châtillon after his father's death, the Count of Saint-Pol after his brother's death.
- Béatrix de Châtillon-Saint-Pol, married to Aubert of Hangest, lord of Senlis.
- Eustachia de Châtillon-Saint-Pol, married in 1215 to Daniel of Bethune, and later married to Robrecht II of Wavrin, marshal of the County of Flanders
- Robert, bishop of Laon(1210-1215)

== Sources ==
- Bloch, Marc (1966). French Rural History: An Essay on Its Basic Characteristics. University of California Press. ISBN 9780520016606.
- DRM_peter (2014). "The Battle of Bouvines (1214) » De Re Militari".
- Evans, Austin P. (1969). "The Albigensian Crusade". In Wolff, Robert Lee; Hazard, Harry W. (eds.). A History of the Crusades. The University of Wisconsin Press. pp. 277–324.
- Evergates, Theodore (2007). The Aristocracy in the County of Champagne, 1100-1300. University of Pennsylvania Press.
- Guebin, Pascal; Maisonneuve, Henri (1951). Histoire Albigeoise (in French). Librairie Philosophique J.Vrin.
- Nieus, Jean-François (2012). "Élisabeth Candavène, comtesse de Saint-Pol (1205-1240/47) : une héritière face à la Couronne". Femmes de pouvoir, femmes politiques durant les derniers siècles du Moyen Âge et au cours de la première Renaissance (in French): 185–211.
- Painter, Sidney (2019). The Scourge of the Clergy: Peter of Dreux, Duke of Brittany. Johns Hopkins University Press.
- Pollock, M. A. (2015). Scotland, England and France After the Loss of Normandy, 1204-1296. The Boydell Press.
- Strickland, Matthew (2021). France, John; DeVries, Kelly; Rogers, Clifford J. (eds.). "Bella plus quam civilia? The Place of Battle in the Context of Civil War under the Anglo-Norman and Angevin Kings, c. 1100-c. 1217". Journal of Medieval Military History. 19: 57–76.

Preceded by Hugh IV of Saint-Pol	Count of Saint-Pol; 1205–1219; With: his wife Elisabeth of Saint-Pol	Succeeded by Guy IV of Châtillon-Saint-Pol
Preceded by Guy III of Châtillon	Lord of Châtillon; 1191–1219	Succeeded by Hugh of Châtillon-Saint-Pol
