= Troissy =

- Commune
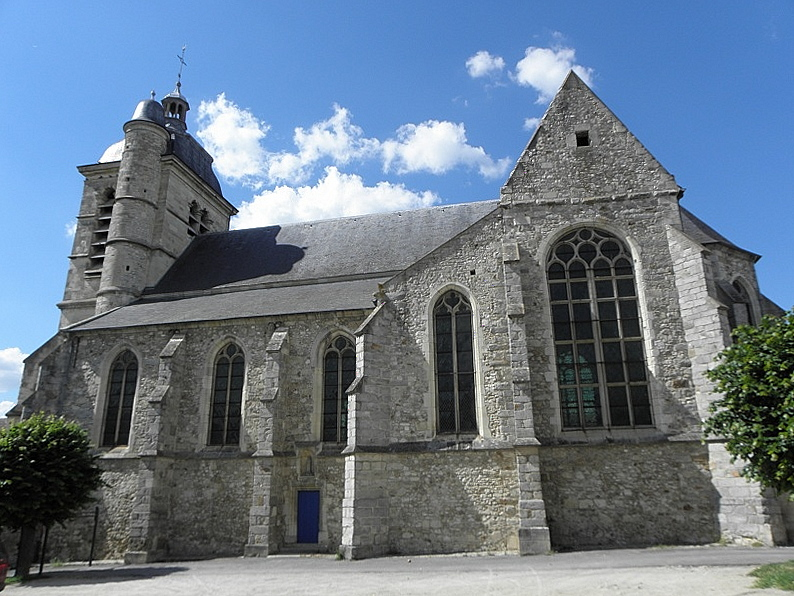
- The Saint Martin church in Troissy
- Location of Troissy
- Location within France Location within Grand Est
- Coordinates: 49°04′54″N 3°42′38″E
- Country: France
- Region: Grand Est
- Department: Marne
- Arrondissement: Épernay
- Canton: Dormans-Paysages de Champagne

Government
  - Mayor (2022–2026): Rémy Joly
- Area^{1}: 15.46 km^{2} (5.97 sq mi)
- Elevation: 67 m (220 ft)
- Population (2023): 821
  - Density: 53.1/km^{2} (138/sq mi)
- Time zone: UTC+01:00 (CET)
  - Summer (DST): UTC+02:00 (CEST)
- INSEE/Postal code: 51585 /51700
- ^{1} French Land Register data, which excludes lakes, ponds, glaciers > 1 km^{2} (0.386 sq mi or 247 acres) and river estuaries.

Troissy (French pronunciation: [tʁwasi]) is a commune in the Marne department in north-eastern France.

== Sights and monuments ==
- Château de Troissy, 12th century castle. Its crypt was classified monument historique in 1924.
- Saint-Martin church, classified monument historique in 1911.
- Monument to the dead
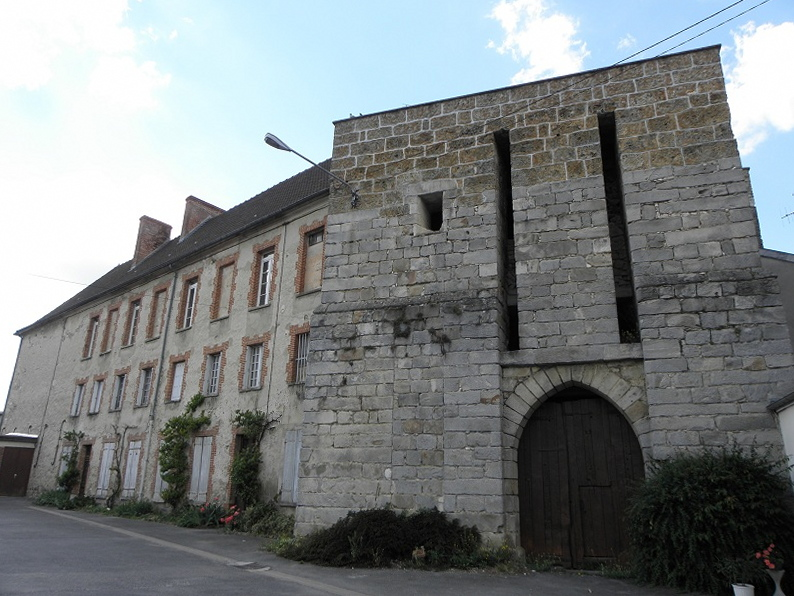
Château de Troissy

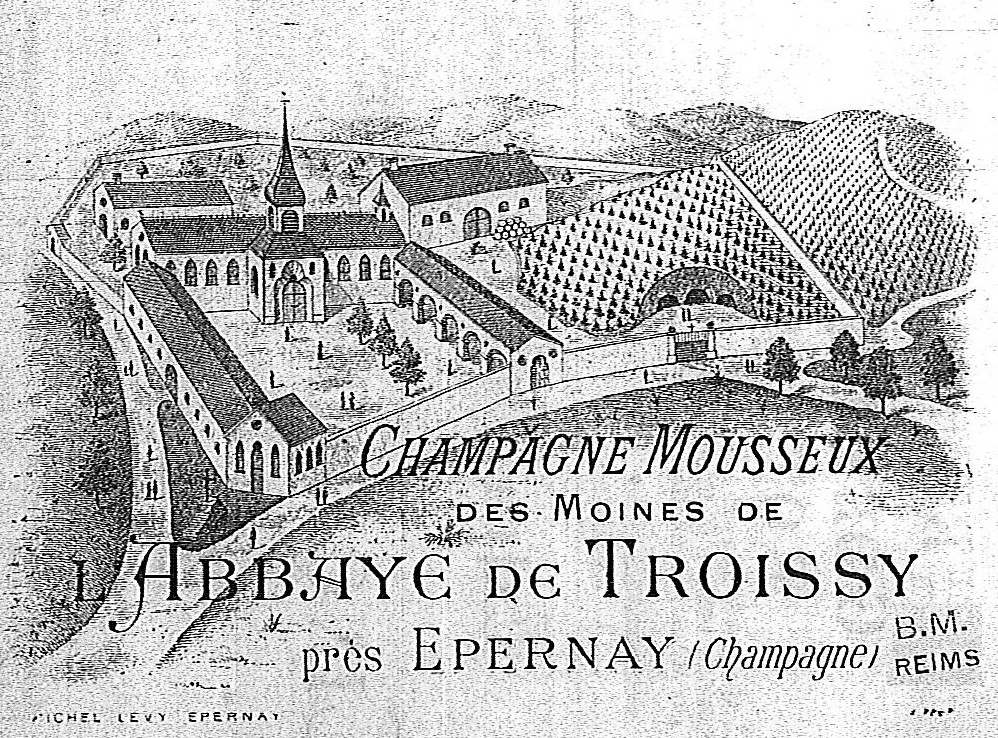
Former priory

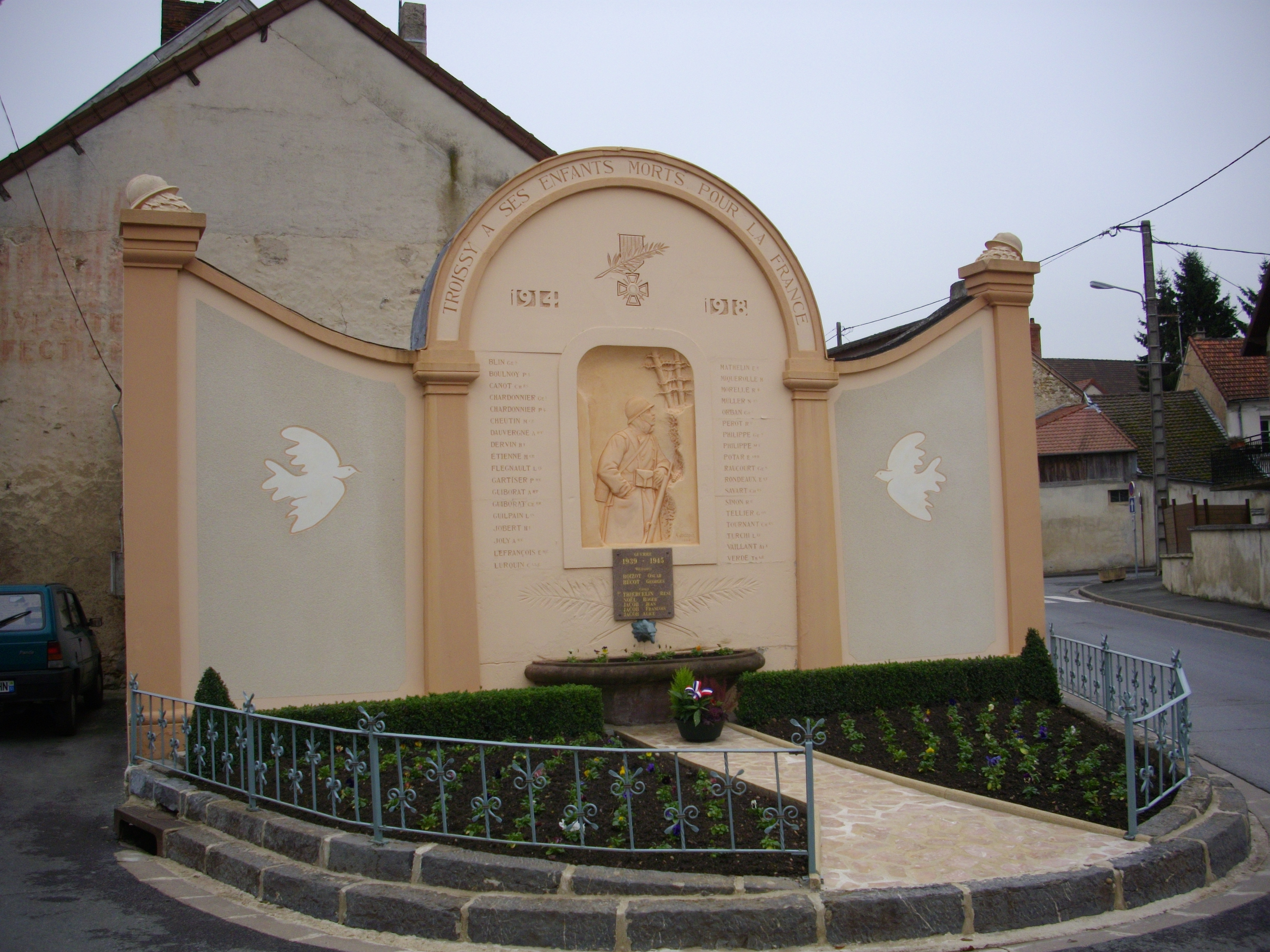
Monument to the dead

== See also ==
- Communes of the Marne department
