= Morialmé Castle =

Château in Wallonia, Belgium

Coordinates: 50.277°N 4.566°E

- Wallonia, Belgium

Site information
- Type: Castle

Morialmé Castle (French: Château de Morialmé) is a château in Morialmé, part of the municipality of Florennes, province of Namur, Wallonia, Belgium.

== History ==
The château and its farm were established by the Comte de Bryas in 1633. The estate comprised 536 hectares.

The château building is formed by a central block, built by Charles de Bryas in the late 17th century, between two Neo-classical wings, in the shape of an H. The central residential block consists of a long space of 10 bays two storeys high built of brick, standing on a basement of stone. The "arms room" (salle d'armes) contains noteworthy stucco decorations representing trophies of arms, as well as various floral and plant motifs. In the centre of the front wall is a monumental porch with a sandstone tympanum bearing the de Bryas arms.

The château and its surroundings were scheduled as a historical monument on 21 December 1979.

== See also ==
- List of castles in Belgium
