= Robert VII of Béthune =

Robert VII, Lord of Béthune
- Born: c. 1201
- Died: 12 November 1248; Sardinia
- Buried: Arras
- Noble family: House of Bethune
- Spouse: Elisabeth of Morialmez
- Issue: Matilda of Béthune
- Father: William II, Lord of Béthune
- Mother: Mathilda of Dendermonde

Robert VII de Béthune (c. 1201 – 12 November 1248 in Sardinia) was a nobleman from the House of Bethune from Artois. He served as a knight and military leader in Flanders and England before inheriting his family territories in France and the Low Countries. He joined the Seventh Crusade, but died en route to the eastern Mediterranean.

== Biography ==
He was a younger son of Lord William II of Béthune (d. 1214) and his wife, Mathilda of Dendermonde.

Robert had no hope of a large inheritance, as his elder brother Daniel (d. 1226) would inherit the Lordship of Béthune. He therefore decided to become a knight at the court of Count Ferdinand of Flanders. The House of Bethune was one of the more influential families in Artois, which had been a Flemish fief until Flanders had to cede it to the French heir apparent Louis, the son of Isabella of Hainault. Count Baldwin IX of Flanders had ceded Artois to Hainault in the Treaty of Péronne. However, his son-in-law Ferdinand pursued a policy aiming to recover Artois. This brought him into conflict with the French royal family. The House of Béthune was split by this power struggle: Robert's father and brother were loyal to the French liege lord, while Robert sided with Flanders.

In 1213, Robert accompanied Count Ferdinand into exile in England after King Philip II of France had invaded Flanders. Later that year, he and the Earl of Salisbury led a successful attack on the French fleet in the port of Damme, thereby thwarting an impending invasion of England. The following year, he participated in the decisive Battle of Bouvines (27 July 1214). King Philip II won the battle, and took Count Ferdinand prisoner. Robert was taken prisoner by a French knight, who released him, after Robert promised to pay a ransom. This story was recorded by an anonymous chronicler, who was employed by Robert and who wrote between 1220 and 1223 a chronicle about the French kings entitled Chroniques des rois de France et ducs de Normandie

Daniel of Béthune died childless in 1226 and Robert inherited the family territories around Béthune, Richebourg, Warneton and Dendermonde, as well as the hereditary post of advocatus of Abbey of St. Vaast near Arras. In 1227, Count Ferdinand was released from prison. He paid homage to the French king and gave his hope of recapturing Artois.

Robert apparently came closer to the French crown in the following years. In 1236, he is named as a guarantor of the Treaty of Péronne, which must imply that he now recognized this treaty.

In 1248, Robert decided to join the crusade of King Louis IX of France to Egypt (the Seventh Crusade). During a stopover in Sardinia, en route to Cyprus, he fell ill and died. He was buried in Arras.

== Marriage and issue ==
Robert was married to Elisabeth of Morialmez. He had a daughter, Matilda (d. 1264). In 1246, she married Guy of Dampierre, who was related to the Counts of Flanders and inherited the county in 1251. Since Robert had no sons, Matilda and Guy also inherited Béthune. Their son, Robert III ceded Béthune to France in 1312.

A junior line of the House of Béthune, descended from Robert's younger brother Guillaume III (d. 1243), survives to this day as Lords of Meulebeke.
