= House of Blois =

French dynasty

House of Blois Blesevins
- Royal house
- Arms of the House of Blois
- Country: West Francia; France; Navarre; England; Jerusalem
- Founded: 906; 1120 years ago
- Founder: Theobald the Elder
- Final ruler: Blois: Margaret, Countess of Blois; Champagne and Navarre: Joan I of Navarre; Sully and Boisebelle: Mary, Lady of Sully and Princess of Boisebelle; Sancerre: Margaret, Countess of Sancerre
- Titles: King of England; King of Navarre; King of Jerusalem; Chamberlain of the King of France; Constable of France; Treasurer of France; Grand Butler of France; Marshal of France; Seneschal of France; Grand Bottler of France; Bottler of France; Regent of France; Lesser titles: Governor of Navarre; Chamberlain of the Duke of Burgundy; Governor of Burgundy; Marshal of Burgundy; Count palatine; Prince of Boisbelle; Prince of Achaea; Duke of Normandy; Duke of Nicaea; Count of Blois; Count of Champagne; Count of Chartres; Count of Châteaudun; Count of Troyes; Count of Beauvais; Count of Sancerre; Count of Provins; Count of Boulogne; Count of Reims; Count of Aumale; Count of Mortain; Count of Dreux; Count of Meaux; Count of Tours; Count of Omois; Count of Brie; Count of Gien; Count of La Chapelle; Count of Saint-Florentin; Count of Château-Thierry; Count of Bar-sur-Aube; Count of Vitry-le-François; Count of Clermont-en-Beauvaisis; Co-Governor of Flanders; Lieutenant General of Artois; Earl of York; Viscount of Blois; Viscount of Chartres; Viscount of Tours; Viscount of Troyes; Viscount of Dijon; Governor of Languedoc; Commander of La Villedieu-en-Fontenette; Commander of Temple-les-Dole; Commander of Sales; Commander of Montseugny; Lord of Sancerre; Lord of Holderness; Lord of Sagonne; Lord of Lacarre; Lord of Champlitte; Lord of Sancergeus; Lord of Noirmoutier; Lord of Meillant; Lord of Marchéville; Lord of Blet; Lord of Beaujeu; Lord of Herry; Lord of Châteaumeillant; Lord of Provins; Lord of Cors; Lord of Romefort; Lord of Craon; Lord of Talmay; Lord of Flagey; Lord of Oiselay; Lord of Fénay; Lord of Ambrault; Lord of Vailly; Lord of Villebon; Lord of Vaillon; Lord of Charpingnon; Lord of Charenton; Lord of Barlieu; Lord of Assigny; Lord of Charenton; Lord of Condé; Lord of Bommiers; Lord of Coësmes; Lord of Boisgibault; Lord of Ouges; Lord of Plancy; Lord of Soësmes; Lord of Larrey; Lord of Grancey; Lord of Nonancourt; Lord of Varennes; Lord of Collonges; Lord of Brochon; Lord of Chalucet; Lord of Luzy; Lord of Berry; Lord of Longuey; Lord of Quingey; Lord of Chevigny; Lord of Vierzon; lord of Villargoix; Lord of Erry; Lord of Partie; Lord of Yenville; Lord of Clemency; Lord of Vonges; Lord of Pleurs; Lord of Balagny; Lord of Vercel; Lord of Domprel; Lord of Bressey; Lord of Ouges; Lord of Brochon; Lord of Longvy; Lord of Flagey; Lord of Foucherans; Lord of Barges; Lord of Mantoche; Lord of Villeneuve; Lord of Nogent; Lord of Champagny; Lord of Orval; Lord of Épineuil; Lord of Bruyères; Lord of Argent; Lord of Chailly; Lord of Dienville; Lord of Bressey; Lord of Vaux; Lord of Collonges; Lord of Brochon; Lord of Seveux; Lord of Châlucet; Lord of Mercueil; Lord of Saulx; Lord of Frolois; Lord of Massingy; Lord of Drambon; Lord of Obsonville; Lord of Champvans; Lord of La Loupe; Lord of Le Pondy; Lord of La Grange; Lord of La Cordille; Lord of La Chapelle; Lord of La Chapolette; Lord of Saint-Rémy; Lord of Saint-Valery; Lord of Saint-Août; Lord of Saint-Brisson; Lord of Montreuil-Bellay; Lord of Menetou-Salon; Lord of Château-Thierry; Lord of La Ferté-Loupière; Lord of La Motte-Ternant; Lord of La Motte-Sully; Lord of Sully-sur-Loire; Lord of Pontailler-sur-Saône; Lord of Por-sur-Chaon; Lord of Aix-dans-Gilon; Lord of Mont-de-Villers; Lord of Magny-sur-Tille; Lord of Vailly-sur-Sauldre; Lord of Saulon-la-Rue; Lord of Saulon-la-Chapelle; Lord of Tart-le-Haut; Lord of Tart-l'Abbaye; Lord of Tart-le-Bas; Lord of Villers-les-Pots; Lord of Ainay-le-Vieil; Lord of Nogent-lès-Montbard; Lord of Heuilley-sur-Saône; Lord of Magny-sur-Tille; Lord of Venarey-les-Laumes; Lord of Granges-sous-Grignon; Lord of Lamarche-sur-Saône; Lord of Courcelles-sous-Grignon; Lord of Châtillon-sur-Loing; Lord of Charenton-du-Cher; Lord of La Roche-sur-l'Ognon; Lord of Saint-Michel-sur-Loire; Lady of Cernoy; Lady of Aubry; Lady of Maupas; Lady of Brion; Lady of Bueil; Baron of Talmay; Baron of Flagey; Baron of Antigny; Baron of Châlus; Baron of Montferrand; Baron of Drambon; Baron of Barges; Baron of Rigney; Baron of Pusey; Baron of Montferrand; Baron of Vaux; Baron of Port-sur-Saône; Cardinal Priest of Santa Sabina; Archbishop of Reims; Archbishop of Bourges; Archbishop of Sens; Archbishop-elect of York; Bishop of Paris; Bishop of Chartres; Bishop of Winchester; Bishop of Tournai; Bishop of Worcester; Bishop of Châlons-sur-Marne; Bishop-designate of Salisbury; Abbot of Glastonbury; Abbot of Fécamp; Abbot of Westminster; Abbot of Cluny; Abbot of Lagny; Abbot of Norfolk; Abbot of Surrey; Abbot of Chertsey; Abbot of Holme; Abbot of St Benet’s Abbey; Abbess of Fontevraud; Abbess of Sainte-Trinité; Abbess of Romsey; Prior of Bermondsey; Prior of La Charité-sur-Loire; Prior of Beaumont; Canon of Autun; Master Falconer
- Estates: Blois, Champagne, Navarre, England, Sancerre, Boulogne, Aumale, etc
- Dissolution: 1418
- Cadet branches: House of Blois-Champagne; House of Blois-Chartres; House of Blois-Navarre; House of Sancerre; House of Lacarre; House of Sully; House of Sully-Beaujeu; House of Champlitte; House of Champlitte-Pontailler; House of Aumale

The House of Blois (French: [blwa]), also known as The Blesevins, was a noble family that arose in the Kingdom of West Francia in the early 10th century, and whose prominent members were often named Theobald (Thibaud, Thibault, Thibaut in French).

== History ==
This lineage came from Theobald the Elder, viscount of Tours before 908. Theobald became viscount of Blois before 922. Afterwards the House of Blois accumulated the counties of Blois, Chartres, Châteaudun and as successors of Herbertians the counties of Troyes, Reims and Meaux - core of the County of Champagne, and finally the kingdom of Navarre.

The House of Blois-Champagne, which was founded by Theobold II in 1025, split into several branches. The House of Blois-Chartres, which was founded by Theobold V of Blois inherited the counties of Blois and Chartres and others in 1152. His descendants would hold the counties until the deaths of Margaret and Isabella, to which the branch became extinct in 1249. The House of Blois-Navarre, which was founded by Theobold I of Navarre, when he inherited the throne from his uncle, Sancho Garcés VI. This branch became the senior line later and eventually became extinct in 1305 with the death of Joan I of Navarre, wife of Philip IV of France. Champagne and Navarre passed to the Capetian dynasty. The House of Sancerre, was founded by Stephen I, Count of Sancerre, a younger son of Theobold II, Count of Champagne. He inherited the county on his father's death. This branch became extinct at the death of Margaret of Sancerre in 1418 or 1419. The final branch, the House of Lacarre, was founded by Juan Enriquez, the illegitimate son of Henry I of Navarre.

When Louis VII of France was greatly threatened by the vast collection of territories in the person of Henry II of England, he chose a wife from the House of Blois-Champagne (Adela of Champagne) as a counterpoise to Angevin power.

When William married the Lady of Sully, Adela, sometime after 1100, he became jure uxoris Count or Lord of Sully. This would make him establish a cadet branch in Sully. This branch would also form its own cadet branch, the House of Sully-Beaujeu, which was when Odo, the son of Gilles III, Lord of Sully, acquired the Lordship of Beaujeu.

Sometime during or past 1126, Odo I was taken over by his maternal family. He then became Lord of Champlitte, which he likely inherited from his mother, Isabella, or from the generosity of his uncle Renaud III, Count of Burgundy. He in turn would establish a new cadet branch in Champlitte. This Branch would also establish its own branch, the House of Champlitte-Pontailler. Which was when William I, son of Odo I, acquired the Lordship of Pontailler.

Stephen, King of England, 1135–1154, was both a member of the House of Blois and the last Anglo-Norman King, being the grandson of William the Conqueror through his daughter Adela of Normandy.

A branch of the family was established in Sancerre by Stephen I, Count of Sancerre, a younger son of Count Theobald II of Champagne. This branch became extinct at the death of Margaret of Sancerre in 1418 or 1419.

== Rulers ==
=== House of Blois ===
Partitions and acquisitions of Blois under Blois rule

Flemish; County of Boulogne	Norman; County of Aumale	Counties of Troyes and Meaux	County of Blois (940-1230/49)		Barony of Sully-sur-Loire
Flemish; County of Boulogne	Norman; County of Aumale	County of Champagne (1st creation) (1037–1066)	County of Blois (940-1230/49)		Barony of Sully-sur-Loire
Flemish; County of Boulogne	County of Aumale (1069–1196)				Barony of Sully-sur-Loire
Flemish; County of Boulogne	County of Aumale (1069–1196)	County of Champagne (2nd creation) (1089–1125)			Barony of Sully-sur-Loire
Flemish; County of Boulogne	County of Aumale (1069–1196)	County of Champagne (2nd creation) (1089–1125)			Barony of Sully (1107–1409)
County of Boulogne (1125–1170)	County of Aumale (1069–1196)				Barony of Sully (1107–1409)
County of Boulogne (1125–1170)	County of Aumale (1069–1196)	County of Champagne (3rd creation) (1152–1305)		County of Sancerre (1152–1419)	Barony of Sully (1107–1409)
Inherited by the House of Alsace	County of Aumale (1069–1196)	County of Champagne (3rd creation) (1152–1305)		County of Sancerre (1152–1419)	Barony of Sully (1107–1409)
Inherited by the House of Alsace	Annexed to France and re-given to the House of Dammartin (1224)	County of Champagne (3rd creation) (1152–1305)		County of Sancerre (1152–1419)	Barony of Sully (1107–1409)
Inherited by the House of Alsace	Annexed to France and re-given to the House of Dammartin (1224)	County of Champagne (3rd creation) (1152–1305)	Inherited by the Houses of Avesnes and Châtillon	County of Sancerre (1152–1419)	Barony of Sully (1107–1409)
Inherited by the House of Alsace	Annexed to France and re-given to the House of Dammartin (1224)	Annexed to France	Inherited by the Houses of Avesnes and Châtillon	County of Sancerre (1152–1419)	Barony of Sully (1107–1409)
Inherited by the House of Alsace	Annexed to France and re-given to the House of Dammartin (1224)	Annexed to France	Inherited by the Houses of Avesnes and Châtillon	Inherited by the House of Bourbon	Inherited by the La Trémoille family

Table of rulers

Ruler	Born	Reign	Ruling part	Consort	Death	Notes
Theobald I the Trickster	913; Son of Theobald the Elder and Richilde	928 – 975	County of Blois	Luitgarde of Vermandois four children	975 aged 61–62	First ruler of Blois. Until 1041, the counts of Blois were also Counts of Tours.
Odo I Rousselet	950; Son of Theobald I and Luitgarde of Vermandois	975 – 12 March 996	County of Blois	Bertha of Burgundy; 983 six children	12 March 996 aged 45–46	Children of Theobald I, divided their inheritance. Emma's property was inherited by her descendants.
Emma	c.950 Son of Theobald I and Luitgarde of Vermandois	975 – 27 December 1003	County of Blois (at Chinon and Bourgueil)	William IV of Aquitaine; 968 two children	27 December 1003 aged 54–55	Children of Theobald I, divided their inheritance. Emma's property was inherited by her descendants.
Chinon and Bourgueil annexed to Aquitaine
Regency of Bertha of Burgundy (996-999)						Left no heirs, he was succeeded by his brother Odo.
Theobald II	983; First son of Odo I and Bertha of Burgundy	12 March 996 – 11 July 1004	County of Blois	Unmarried	11 July 1004 aged 20–21	Left no heirs, he was succeeded by his brother Odo.
Odo II/I of Champagne	c.985 Second son of Odo I and Bertha of Burgundy	11 July 1004 – 15 November 1037	County of Blois (with Champagne since 1022)	Maud of Normandy; 1003/4 no children Ermengarde of Auvergne c.1005 three/four children	15 November 1037 aged 51–52	Seized Champagne for himself, without royal approval, and kept these territories.
Theobald III	1012; First son of Odo II/ and Ermengarde of Auvergne	15 November 1037 – 30 September 1089	County of Blois (with Champagne since 1066)	Gersende of Maine no children Gundrada one child Adele of Valois c.1040 four children	30 September 1089; Épernay aged 76–77	Children of Odo II/I, divided their inheritance.
Stephen II	c.1015 Second son of Odo II/ and Ermengarde of Auvergne	15 November 1037 – 1047	County of Champagne	Adele one child	1047 aged 31–32	Children of Odo II/I, divided their inheritance.
Regency of Theobald III of Blois (1047-1054)						In 1066, Champagne was reabsorbed in Blois. Odo inherited from marriage, later, the County of Aumale.
Odo II	1040; Son of Stephen II and Adele	1047 – 1066	County of Champagne	Adelaide of Normandy c.1060 one child	1115 aged 74–75	In 1066, Champagne was reabsorbed in Blois. Odo inherited from marriage, later, the County of Aumale.
Odo II	1040; Son of Stephen II and Adele	1069 – 1115	County of Aumale	Adelaide of Normandy c.1060 one child	1115 aged 74–75	In 1066, Champagne was reabsorbed in Blois. Odo inherited from marriage, later, the County of Aumale.
Champagne briefly annexed to Blois
Stephen Henry the Wise	c.1045 Son of Theobald III and Gundrada	30 September 1089 – 19 May 1102	County of Blois	Adela of Normandy c.1080 Chartres eleven children	19 May 1102; Ramla aged 55–56	Children of Theobald III, divided their inheritance. Odo left no children, and he was succeeded by his brother Hugh.
Odo III	1062; First son of Theobald III and Adele of Valois	30 September 1089 – 1093	County of Champagne	Unmarried	1093 aged 30–31	Children of Theobald III, divided their inheritance. Odo left no children, and he was succeeded by his brother Hugh.
Hugh	1074; Second son of Theobald III and Adele of Valois	1093 – 1125	County of Champagne	Constance of France; 1094 one child Isabelle of Burgundy; 1110 one child?	1125 aged 50–51	In 1125, after his death, his domains re-joined Blois.
Champagne briefly annexed to Blois
William the Simple	c.1085 First son of Stephen Henry and Adela of Normandy	19 May 1102 – 1107	County of Blois	Agnes of Sully; 13 November 1104 five children	1150 aged 64–65	Deposed from the main patrimony of the family, inherited by marriage the barony of Sully-sur-Loire.
William the Simple	c.1085 First son of Stephen Henry and Adela of Normandy	1105 – 1150	Barony of Sully	Agnes of Sully; 13 November 1104 five children	1150 aged 64–65	Deposed from the main patrimony of the family, inherited by marriage the barony of Sully-sur-Loire.
Theobald IV/II the Great	1090; Second son of Stephen Henry and Adela of Normandy	1107 – 10 January 1152	County of Blois (with Champagne from 1125)	Matilda of Carinthia; 1123 ten children	10 January 1152 aged 61–62	Succeeded his deposed elder brother in Blois. Reunited Blois and Champagne in 1125.
Stephen	c.1070 Son of Odo II and Adelaide of Normandy	1115 – 1127	County of Aumale	Hawise de Mortimer c.1100 four children	1127 aged 56–57	His father-in-law supported him in his claimancy for the throne of England.
Stephen	1092; Blois; Third son of Stephen Henry and Adela of Normandy	1125 – 3 May 1152	County of Boulogne (jure uxoris)	Countess Matilda of Boulogne; 1125 three children	25 October 1154; Dover aged 61–62	Count of Boulogne by right of his wife. Also King of England.
William the Fat	c.1100? Son of Stephen and Hawise de Mortimer	1127 – 20 August 1179	County of Aumale	Cicely FitzDuncan, Lady of Skipton c.1130 eleven children	20 August 1179 aged 78–79?	He was also made Earl of York. Left his domains in Aumale to his only daughter, Hawise.
Odo-Archambaud III	1109; Son of Stephen Henry and Adela of Normandy	1150 – 1164	Barony of Sully	Mahaut de Beaugency three children	1164 aged 54–55	
Henry I the Liberal	December 1127; First son of Theobald IV/II and Matilda of Carinthia	10 January 1152 – 16 March 1181	County of Champagne	Maria of France; 1159 four children	16 March 1181; Troyes aged 53	Children of Theobald the Great, divided their inheritance.
Theobald V the Good	1130; Second son of Theobald IV/II and Matilda of Carinthia	10 January 1152 – 20 January 1191	County of Blois	Sybil of Chateaurenault no children Alix of France; 1164 seven children	20 January 1191; Acre aged 60–61	Children of Theobald the Great, divided their inheritance.
Regency of Alix of France (1190-1191)						Children of Theobald the Great, divided their inheritance.
Stephen I	1133; Third son of Theobald IV/II and Matilda of Carinthia	10 January 1152 – 7 September 1191	County of Sancerre	Adélais de Donzy no children Béatriz three children Aénor one child	7 September 1191; Saint-Jean-d'Acre aged 57–58	Children of Theobald the Great, divided their inheritance.
Eustace IV	1129; First son of Stephen and Matilda I of Boulogne	3 May 1152 – 17 August 1153	County of Boulogne	Constance of France; 1140 no children	17 August 1153; Bury St Edmunds aged 23–24	Left no descendants. He was succeeded by his brother.
William I	1137; Second son of Stephen and Matilda I of Boulogne	17 August 1153 – 11 October 1159	County of Boulogne	Isabel de Warenne, Countess of Surrey; 1148 no children	11 October 1159; Toulouse aged 21–22	Also Earl of Surrey, in the English peerage. Left no descendants. He was succeeded by his sister.
Maria I	1136; Daughter of Stephen and Matilda I of Boulogne	11 October 1159 – 1170	County of Boulogne	Matthew, Count of Boulogne; 1160 (annulled 1170) two children	25 July 1182; Montreuil aged 45–46	Abducted by her future husband, who married her. She tried to divorce him, and finally did it in 1170, but he continued to rule jointly with her in Boulogne, and the children of the couple kept their inheritance rights.
Boulogne was inherited by the House of Alsace
Gilles II	1133; Son of Odo-Archambaud III and Mahaut de Beaugency	1164 – 1193	Barony of Sully	Lucie de Charenton-sur-Cher three children	1193 aged 59–60	
Hawise	c.1140 Daughter of William and Cicely FitzDuncan, Lady of Skipton	20 August 1179 – 1194	County of Aumale (de jure 1194–1214)	William de Mandeville, 3rd Earl of Essex c.1180 no children William de Forz c.1190 one child Baldwin of Bethune; 1196 one child	11 March 1214 aged 73–74	Ruled together with her husbands. In 1194, Philip II of France took Aumale to royal domain, and gave it to Renaud I, Count of Dammartin (1224). In the English peerage, the claim to the county continued, through the Earldom of Albemarle (titular): 1194-1214: Hawise, with Baldwin of Bethune (1196–1212), jure uxoris; 1214-1242: William de Forz I, son of Hawise; 1242-1260: William de Forz II; 1260-1269: Thomas de Forz; 1269-1274: Aveline de Forz, sister of Thomas.
Aumale was annexed to the Kingdom of France
Henry II	29 July 1166; First son of Henry I and Maria of France	16 March 1181 – 10 September 1197	County of Champagne	Isabella I of Jerusalem; 6 May 1192 two children	10 September 1197; Acre aged 31	Left Champagne in Crusade and established there as king consort of Jerusalem. Left the regency to his mother. As regent, Maria established the patched lands of Champagne as an unified territory. With the death of Henry II in Jerusalem, she passed the county to her youngest son, Theobald.
Regency of Maria of France (1190-1197)						Left Champagne in Crusade and established there as king consort of Jerusalem. Left the regency to his mother. As regent, Maria established the patched lands of Champagne as an unified territory. With the death of Henry II in Jerusalem, she passed the county to her youngest son, Theobald.
Regency of Alix of France (1191-1197)						
Louis I	1172; Son of Theobald V and Alix of France	20 January 1191 – 14 April 1205	County of Blois	Catherine, Countess of Clermont-en-Beauvaisis; 1184 three children	14 April 1205; Adrianople aged 32–33	
William I	1176; Son of Stephen I and Béatrix	7 September 1191 – 1217	County of Sancerre	Denise de Déols no children Marie de Charenton one child Eustachie de Courtenay two children	1217; Epirus aged 40–41	
Archambaud IV	c.1170 Son of Gilles II and Lucie de Charenton-sur-Cher	1193 – 23 August 1240	Barony of Sully	Alix de Brienne; 1177 four children? Perseis d'Aschères no children Margaret no children	23 August 1240; Sully-sur-Loire aged 69–70	
Theobald III	13 May 1179; Troyes; Second son of Henry I and Maria of France	10 September 1197 – 24 May 1201	County of Champagne	Blanche of Navarre; 1 July 1199; Chartres one child	24 May 1201; Troyes aged 22	
Regency of Blanche of Navarre (1201-1222)						Blanche was regent for her son, and protected him in the War of the Succession of Champagne, in which Theobald's cousins claimed the county: 1216-1222: Philippa of Champagne, daughter of Henry II; 1233: Alice of Champagne, daughter of Henry II; Through Blanche, Theobald was also the heir and also through her, he would inherit the Kingdom of Navarre, from his uncle, Sancho VII of Navarre. Theobald was also an accomplished troubadour, which gave him his nickname.
Theobald IV the Troubadour (Theobald I as King of Navarre)	30 May 1201; Troyes; Posthumous son of Theobald III and Blanche of Navarre	24 May 1201 – 8 July 1253	County of Champagne (with Kingdom of Navarre since 1234)	Gertrude of Dagsburg; 1220 (annulled 1222) no children Agnes of Beaujeu; 1222 one child Margaret of Bourbon; 12 September 1232 six children	8 July 1253; Pamplona aged 52	Blanche was regent for her son, and protected him in the War of the Succession of Champagne, in which Theobald's cousins claimed the county: 1216-1222: Philippa of Champagne, daughter of Henry II; 1233: Alice of Champagne, daughter of Henry II; Through Blanche, Theobald was also the heir and also through her, he would inherit the Kingdom of Navarre, from his uncle, Sancho VII of Navarre. Theobald was also an accomplished troubadour, which gave him his nickname.
Theobald VI the Younger	1190; Blois; Son of Louis I and Catherine of Clermont-en-Beauvaisis	14 April 1205 – 22 April 1218	County of Blois	Mathilde of Alençon c.1210 no children Clemence de Roches no children	22 April 1218; La Ferté-Villeneuil aged 27–28	Left no heirs. He left the county to his aunts, Margaret and Isabella.
Louis I	1207; Son of William I and Marie de Charenton	1217 – 1267	County of Sancerre	Blanche de Courtenay three children Isabella of Mayenne no children	1267 aged 59–60	
Margaret	c.1170 First daughter of Theobald V and Alix of France	22 April 1218 – 12 July 1230	County of Blois (at Blois proper)	Hugh III of Oisy, Viscount of Cambrai; 1183 no children Otto I, Count of Burgundy; 1192 two children Walter II of Avesnes two children	12 July 1230 aged 59–60	Aunts and heiresses of Theobald VI, inherited a partiitioned county. Both would leave their parts of the county to their respective daughters: Mary of Avesnes, daughter of Margaret, inherited Blois; Mahaut of Amboise, daughter of Isabella, inherited Chartres.
Isabella	c.1170 Second daughter of Theobald V and Alix of France	22 April 1218 – 25 November 1249	County of Blois (at Chartres)	Sulpice III, Lord of Amboise c.1200 two children Jean II de Montmirail no children	25 November 1249 aged 78–79	Aunts and heiresses of Theobald VI, inherited a partiitioned county. Both would leave their parts of the county to their respective daughters: Mary of Avesnes, daughter of Margaret, inherited Blois; Mahaut of Amboise, daughter of Isabella, inherited Chartres.
Blois and Chartres were inherited, respectively, by the House of Avesnes and the Amboise family
Henry I	c.1200 Son of Archambaud IV and Alix de Brienne?	23 August 1240 – 1249	Barony of Sully	Maria of Dampierre; 1221 one child Aénor de Saint-Valéry; 1237 no children	1249 aged 48–49	
Henry II	1224; Son of Henry I and Maria of Dampierre	1249 – 1269	Barony of Sully	Péronelle de Joigny (d.1282); December 1251 three children	1269; Tagliacozzo aged 44–45	
Regency of Margaret of Bourbon and James I of Aragon (1253-1256)						Left no children. He was succeeded by his brother.
Theobald V the Younger (Theobald II as King of Navarre)	7 December 1239; Provins; First son of Theobald IV/I and Margaret of Bourbon	8 July 1253 – 4 December 1270	County of Champagne (with Kingdom of Navarre)	Isabella of France; 6 April 1255 no children	4 December 1270; Trapani aged 30	Left no children. He was succeeded by his brother.
John I	1235; First son of Louis I and Blanche de Courtenay	1267 – 1280	County of Sancerre	Marie de Vierzon (1259–1284); 1259 seven children	1280 aged 44–45	Children of Louis I, divided their inheritance.
Henry III	1254; Son of Henry II and Péronelle de Joigny	1269 – 1285	Barony of Sully	Marguerite de Bommiers (d.1323); 1282 two children	1285; Kingdom of Aragon aged 30–31	
Henry III the Fat (Henry I as King of Navarre)	3 December 1249; Champagne; Second son of Theobald IV/I and Margaret of Bourbon	4 December 1270 – 22 July 1274	County of Champagne (with Kingdom of Navarre)	Blanche of Artois; February 1269; Melun two children	22 July 1274; Pamplona aged 24	
Regency of Blanche of Artois (1274-1284)						Her marriage to the king of France determined the personal union of Navarre and Champagne to France.
Joanna I	14 January 1273; Bar-sur-Seine; Daughter of Henry III/I and Blanche of Artois	22 July 1274 – 2 April 1305	County of Champagne (with Kingdom of Navarre)	Philip IV of France; 16 August 1284 seven children	2 April 1305; Vincennes aged 32	Her marriage to the king of France determined the personal union of Navarre and Champagne to France.
Champagne and Navarre annexed to France
Stephen II	1252; First son of John I and Marie de Vierzon	1280 – 16 May 1306	County of Sancerre	Maria of La Marche; 20 April 1289 no children	16 May 1306 aged 53–54	Left no children. The county passed to his brother.
Regency of Marguerite de Bommiers (1285-1296)						Also tresaurer and Grand Butler of France.
Henry IV	1282; Son of Henry III and Marguerite de Bommiers	1285 – 27 January 1336	Barony of Sully	Jeanne de Vendôme c.1305 ten children	27 January 1336; Kingdom of Navarre aged 53–54	Also tresaurer and Grand Butler of France.
John II	c.1260 Second son of John I and Marie de Vierzon	16 May 1306 – 1327	County of Sancerre	Louise de Beaumez three children Isabelle de Mauvoisin-Rosny; 1323 no children	1327 aged 66–67	
Louis II	1305; Son of John II and Louise de Beaumez	1327 – 26 August 1346	County of Sancerre	Béatrix de Roucy (d. aft.1348); 8 July 1329 seven children	1327 aged 66–67	
John	c.1305 Son of Henry IV and Jeanne de Vendôme	27 January 1336 – 1343	Barony of Sully	Margaret of Bourbon; 6 June 1320 three children	1343 aged 37–38	
Louis	c.1325 Son of John and Margaret of Bourbon	1343 – 1382	Barony of Sully	Isabelle de Craon; 1357/8 one child	1382 aged 66–67	
John III	1334; First son of Louis II and Béatrix de Roucy	26 August 1346 – March 1402	County of Sancerre	Marguerite de Marmande (1335–1371) two children Constance of Saluzzo (1345–1421) c.1375 no children	March 1402 aged 67–68	Children of Louis II, divided their inheritance. With the exception of Bommiers and Vauzon, the properties of the brothers returned to the main line by lack of descendants
Robert	c.1340 Second son of Louis II and Béatrix de Roucy	26 August 1346 – 1372	County of Sancerre (at Menetou-Salon)	Unmarried	1372 aged 31–32	Children of Louis II, divided their inheritance. With the exception of Bommiers and Vauzon, the properties of the brothers returned to the main line by lack of descendants
Louis (III)	1341; Sancerre; Third son of Louis II and Béatrix de Roucy	26 August 1346 – 6 February 1402	County of Sancerre (at Assigny)	Unmarried	6 February 1402; Paris aged 60–61	Children of Louis II, divided their inheritance. With the exception of Bommiers and Vauzon, the properties of the brothers returned to the main line by lack of descendants
Isabella	1342; Daughter of Louis II and Béatrix de Roucy	26 August 1346 – 1375	County of Sancerre (at Bommiers and Vouzon)	Pierre de Graçay no children Guichard of Auvergne (d.1415) one child	1375 aged 32–33	Children of Louis II, divided their inheritance. With the exception of Bommiers and Vauzon, the properties of the brothers returned to the main line by lack of descendants
Stephen	c.1345 Fourth son of Louis II and Béatrix de Roucy	26 August 1346 – 1390	County of Sancerre (at Vailly-sur-Sauldre)	Unmarried	1390; Mahdia aged 44–45	Children of Louis II, divided their inheritance. With the exception of Bommiers and Vauzon, the properties of the brothers returned to the main line by lack of descendants
With the exception of Bommiers and Vauzon, the remaining properties were re-annexed to Sancerre
Maria	1365; Daughter of Louis and Isabelle de Craon	1382 – 1409	Barony of Sully	Gui VI de La Trémoille; 1383 five children Charles I, Lord of Albret; 27 January 1401 four children	1409; Pau aged 43–44	After her death, the barony was inherited by the La Trémoille family.
Sully inherited by the La Trémoille family
Margaret	1355; Daughter of John II and Marguerite de Marmande	March 1402 – 1418	County of Sancerre	Gérard de Chabot-Retz (1344–1370); 1364 no children Béraud II, Dauphin of Auvergne; 27 June 1374; Riom eight children Jean de Saligny Lourdin (1395–1446) no children Jacques de Montberon; 1408 no children	1418 aged 62–63	After her death, the county went to the House of Bourbon.
Sancerre annexed to the property of the Capetian House of Bourbon

== Genealogy ==
- Theobald the Old, Viscount of Blois
  - Theobald I, Count of Blois
    - Hugh, Archbishop of Bourges
    - Odo I, Count of Blois
      - Theobald II of Blois
      - Odo II, Count of Blois
        - Theobald III, Count of Blois
          - Stephen, Count of Blois
            - William, Count of Sully
              - Odo Archambaud, Lord of Sully
                - Gilles III, Lord of Sully
                  - Archambaud IV, Lord of Sully
                    - Henry I, Lord of Sully
                      - Henry II, Lord of Sully
                        - Henry III, Lord of Sully
                          - Henry IV, Lord of Sully
                            - John II, Lord of Sully
                              - Louis I, Lord of Sully
                                - Marie, Lady of Sully
                  - Odo I, Lord of Beaujeu
                    - Odo II, Lord of Beaujeu
                      - Odo III, Lord of Beaujeu
                        - Gilles, Lord of Beaujeu
                          - Guyon, Lord of Beaujeu
                            - William I, Lord of La Chapellette
                              - William II, Lord of La Chapellette
                                - William III, Lord of La Chapellette
                                  - William IV, Lord of Vouillon
                        - Pierre I, Lord of Erry
                          - Pierre II, Lord of Erry
                            - Jeanne, Lady of Erry
                        - Odo, Lord of La Motte-Sully
                          - Elinor, Lady of La Motte-Sully
                - Henry, Archbishop of Bourges
                - Odo, Bishop of Paris
              - Henry, Abbot of Fécamp
              - Ranier, Abbot of Cluny
              - Elizabeth, Abbess of Sainte-Trinité
            - Theobald II, Count of Champagne
              - Henry I, Count of Champagne
                - Henry II, Count of Champagne
                - Theobald III, Count of Champagne
                  - Theobald I of Navarre
                    - Theobald II of Navarre
                    - Henry I of Navarre
                      - Joan I of Navarre
              - Theobald V, Count of Blois
                - Louis I, Count of Blois
                  - Theobald VI, Count of Blois
                - Margaret, Countess of Blois
              - William White Hands
              - Stephen I of Sancerre
                - William I, Count of Sancerre
                  - Louis I, Count of Sancerre
                    - John I, Count of Sancerre
                      - Stephen II, Count of Sancerre
                      - John II, Count of Sancerre
                        - Louis II, Count of Sancerre
                          - John III, Count of Sancerre
                            - Margaret, Countess of Sancerre
                          - Louis de Sancerre, Constable of France
                          - Robert, Lord of Menetou
                          - Theobald, Lord of Sagonne
                          - Stephen, Lord of Vailly-sur-Sauldre
                      - Theobald, Bishop of Tournai
                      - Louis, Lord of Sagonne
                    - Robert, Lord of Menetou-Salon
                - Stephen II, Lord of Châtillon-sur-Loing, Grand Butler of France
                  - Stephen III, Lord of Châtillon-sur-Loing
            - Stephen, King of England
              - Eustace IV, Count of Boulogne
              - William I, Count of Boulogne
            - Henry of Blois, Bishop of Winchester
          - Philip, Bishop of Châlons-sur-Marne
          - Odo V, Count of Troyes
          - Hugh, Count of Champagne
            - Odo I of Champlitte (disowned by father)
              - Odo II of Champlitte
                - Oda, Lady of Champlitte
              - William of Champlitte, 1st prince of Achaea
                - William II, Viscount of Dijon
                  - Hugh, Lord of Grancey
                  - Odo IV, Lord of Grancey
                  - William III, Viscount of Dijon
                    - William IV, Lord of Magny-ser-Tille
                      - Hugh, Lord of Magny-ser-Tille
                        - John, Lord of Magny-ser-Tille
                    - Simon, Lord of Pontailler
                    - Stephen, Lord of Vonges
                      - John
                        - William
                          - Erard, Master Falconer
                            - John, Lord of Vonges
                  - Guy, Viscount of Dijon
                    - Hugh, Lord of Talmay
                      - Guy II, Lord of Talmay
                        - Guy III, Lord of Talmay
                          - William II, Lord of Talmay
                            - Paul, Lord of Talmay
                              - Claude, Lord of Talmay
                                - Louis, Lord of Talmay
                                  - Olivier, Lord of Bressey
                                    - Philippe, Lord of Longvy
                                  - François, Lord of Clémencey
                                  - John, Lord of Talmay
                                    - John Louis, Lord of Talmay
                                - Paul, Lord of Châtillon-en-Bazois
                                  - Anatole Louis, Lord of Châtillon-en-Bazois
                            - Claude, Lord of Flaigey
                              - Henry, Lord of Flaigey
                          - Guyart, Lord of Magny-ser-Tille
                  - Robert, Lord of Larrey
                - Odo III, Lord of La Marche
                  - Simon
                    - Mathieu, Lord of Longwy
                      - John II, Lord of Longwy
                        - Simon, Lord of Bellevesyre
        - Stephen II, Count of Troyes and Meaux
          - Odo, Count of Champagne
            - Stephen, Count of Aumale
              - William le Gros, 1st Earl of Albemarle
  - Richard, Archbishop of Bourges

== Arms ==
According to the article on the Origin of coats of arms in the section Hereditary, individual and fief emblems (see copious references there), many arms associated with a family group tended to be similar. The arms of the House of Blois exhibit this pattern as an early form of heraldic differencing.

House Arms

Ancient Arms

Main Arms

House of Blois-Chartres

House of Blois-Champagne

House of Blois-Navarre

House of Sancerre

House of Sully

House of Sully (after 1346)

House of Champlitte

House of Lacarre

Other House Arms

House of Aumale

House of Champlitte-Pontailler

House Arms Variants

House of Champlitte

House of Blois-Navarre

Personal Arms

Stephen I of Sancerre

Stephen II of Sancerre

Louis I of Sancerre

John II of Sancerre

Odo-Archambaud III of Sully

John of Sully

(Variant) John of Sully

Louis I of Blois

(Attributed) Stephen I of Blois

(Attributed) Stephen II of Blois

Other Personal Arms

William I of Boulogne

Joan I of Navarre

Guy II of Pontailler

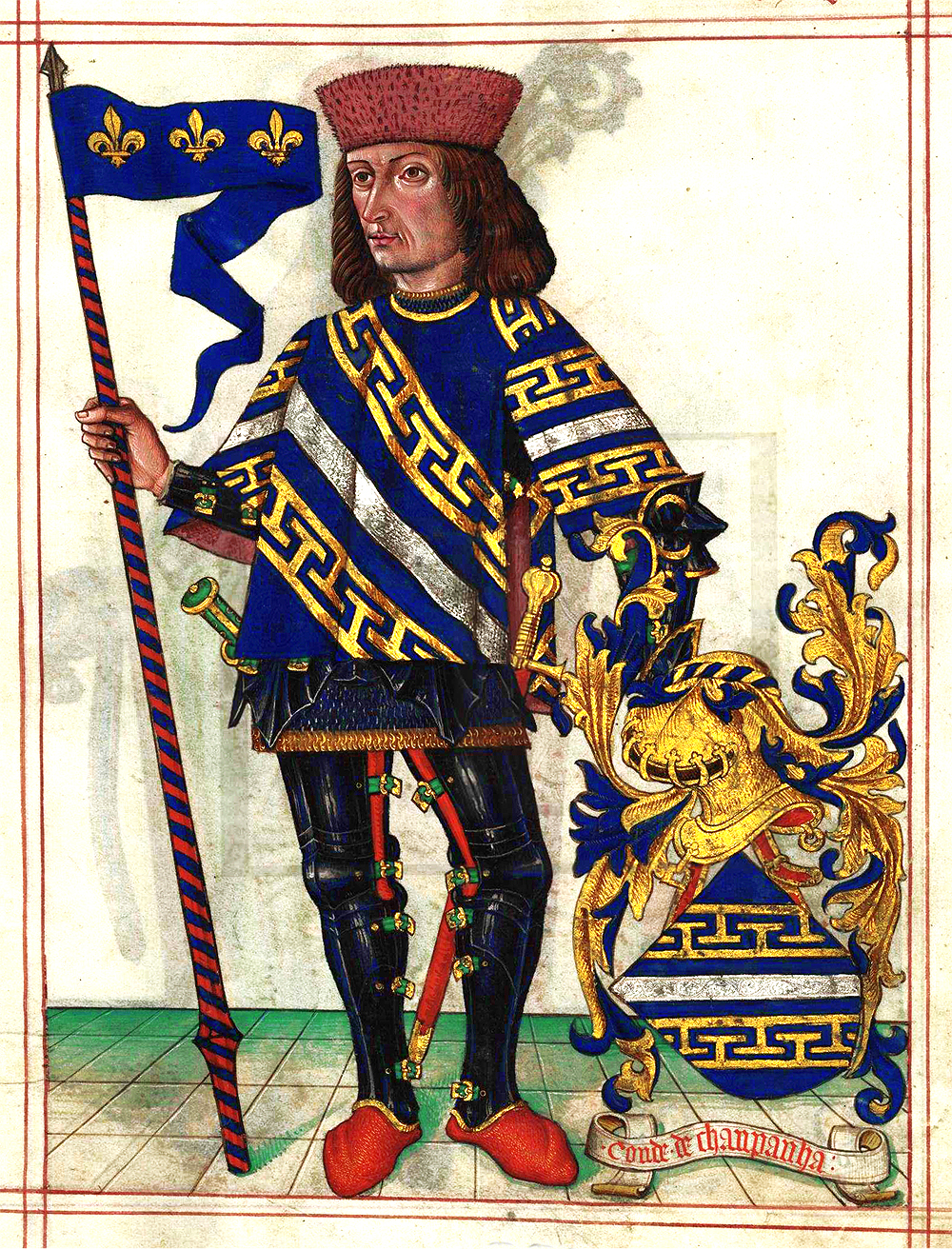
Tabard and coat of arms of Champagne

== See also ==
- Navarre monarchs family tree
- List of Navarrese monarchs from the House of Blois

Royal house House of Blois
Preceded by House of Normandy	Ruling house of England; 1135–1154	Succeeded by House of Plantagenet
