= Lord of Sully =

The lord of Sully was a feudal baron ruling Sully-sur-Loire from around 1000 until 1606, when the lordship was raised to a duchy.

The first recorded lord of Sully was Archambaud around the year 1000. His male line died out when the Lady Agnes married William of Blois. King Philip II occupied Sully for twelve years before restoring it. Lord Henry II died during the Angevin conquest of Sicily in 1269. Henry III, who was the Butler of France, died during the Capetian invasion of Aragon in 1285.

The existing Château de Sully-sur-Loire was built in the 13th and 14th centuries. King Charles VII and Joan of Arc visited the château in 1430. The lordship passed to the La Trémoille family when Lady Marie married Guy VI de La Trémoille. In 1606, the La Trémoille sold the lordship to Maximilien de Béthune, who was raised to Duke of Sully.

== Barony ==
The barony of Sully was bordered to the north by the Loire, at Sully-sur-Loire, to the south by the Beuvron river between Lamotte-Beuvron and Cerdon, then veering towards Coullons. The Notre-Heure river and Poilly-lez-Gien marked the eastern border, while Guilly, Tigy and Ménestreau-en-Villette defined the boundaries of the barony to the west.

The castles of Sully, Saint-Gondon and Sennely were part of the baronial fief.

== List of lords and dukes of Sully ==
The following list, from Paul Abbott, is incomplete.

- Archambaud I (c. 1000)
- Archambaud II (died c. 1060)
- Gilon I, whose daughter Mahaut married Odo Arpin
- Agnes, daughter of Gilon I, ruled with her husband, William of Blois
- Eudes Archambaud III
- Gilon II (died c. 1195)
- Archambaud IV
- Henri I
- Henri II (died 1269)
- Jean I (died 1281)
- Henri III (died 1285), brother of Jean I
- Henri IV (died 1336)
- Jean II (died 1343)
- Louis
- Marie, ruled with her husband, Guy VI de La Trémoille
- Georges (died 1446)

After 1606, the lords were made dukes.

- Maximilien I de Béthune (died 1641)
- François (died 1661), son of Maximilien II de Béthune
- Maximilien Pierre (died 1712)
- Maximilien Henri (died 1729)
- Louis (died 1761)
- Maximilien Antoine Arnaud, cousin of Louis
