= Henry de Sully =

Henry or Henri de Sully may refer to:

- Henry de Sully (died 1189), abbot of Fécamp, bishop-designate of Salisbury and archbishop-elect of York
- Henry de Sully (bishop of Worcester), abbot of Glastonbury and bishop of Worcester
- Henry de Sully, Archbishop of Bourges (died 1200)
- Henri IV de Sully (died 1336), treasurer of Philip V of France and seneschal of Gascony
