= Guy II de Pontailler =

French nobleman

- Manor of Talmay, Fenay, Chevigny, Saulon-la-Rue, Saulon-la-Chapelle, Chailly, Champagny, Tart-le-Haut, Pontailler-sur-Saône and Heuilley-sur-Saône
- Coat of arms
- Tenure: 1364 - 1392
- Predecessor: Hugues de Pontailler
- Successor: Guy III de Pontailler
- Born: Guy de Champlitte-Pontailler; 1335
- Died: 1392 (aged 56–57)
- Noble family: Champlitte-Pontailler
- Spouses: Marguerite de Blaizy, Marguerite d'Anglure, Marguerite de Conflans.
- Heir: Guy III de Pontailler
- Father: Hugues de Pontailler
- Mother: Jeanne de Chalon

Guy II de Pontailler was a French nobleman, successor of Hugues de Pontailler, part of the noble family Champlitte-Pontailler of Burgundy. He was born in Burgundy in 1348 (or 1335) and died in 1392 (possibly on May 4). He was appointed marshal of the Duchy of Burgundy by duke Philip the Bold, then he took part in an expedition across the Saône against the Count of Montbéliard, then he fought in the Hundred Years' War. Guy II received the title of lord of Talmay, Fenay, Chevigny, Saulon-la-Rue, Saulon-la-Chapelle, Chailly, Champagny, Tart-le-Haut, Pontailler-sur-Saône and Heuilley-sur-Saône.

== Biography ==
=== Ancestry ===
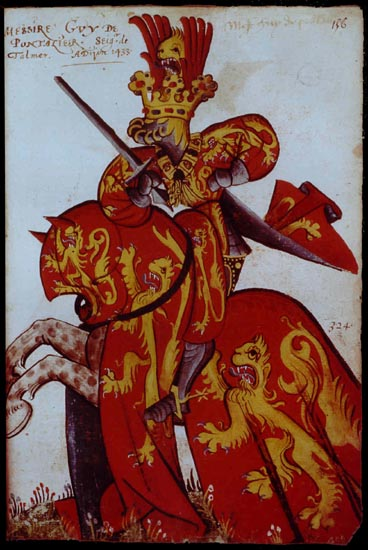
Guy III De Pontailler, son of Guy II and knight of the Golden Fleece (15th-century manuscript, BNF).

Guy II de Pontailler was a direct descendant of Guillaume de Champlitte, who became Prince of Achaia after the Fourth Crusade and was the ancestor of the de Champlitte-Pontailler family, which held a very position in the Duchy of Burgundy for four centuries. Guillaume married Eustachie de Courtenay. His son, Guillaume II (1200-1271), inherited most of the family property, including the viscounty of Dijon, and the seigneuries of Pontailler-sur-Saône, Maxilly-sur-Saône, Vonges and Heuilley-sur-Saône.

Guy II de Pontailler was born of the union of Hugues de Pontailler (?-1385), lord of Talmay, Heuilley, Fenay, Chevigny, Saulon, Villeneuve and Chailly, with Jeanne de Chalon (?-1372).

He had a younger brother: Jean de Pontailler.

=== Marriages ===
Guy II de Pontailler first married Marguerite de Blaizy (?-1367), he had two children with her: Guillemette (?-1401) and Jacques (?-September 28, 1396). After, he married Marguerite d'Anglure (1338-1402), daughter of Ogier VII d'Anglure, lord of Anglure, Saint-Chéron and Étoges, and later he married Marguerite de Conflans, born on March 23, 1369, and they had one child: Guy III de Pontailler (1382-1439).

=== Marshal of Burgundy ===
==== Nomination ====
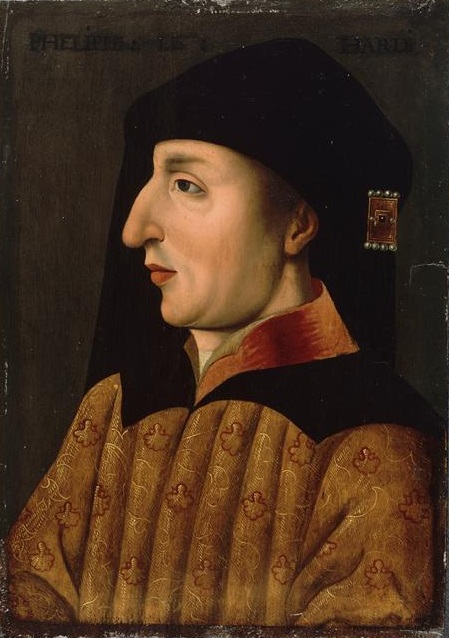
Philip II of Burgundy

In the 14th century, Burgundy was in a permanent state of insecurity due to the Great Companies. Duke Philip the Bold decided to reinforce the principality's defense system by fortifying towns and appointing captains to strongholds. Above all, he had to rely on loyal, well-paid men. According to Bertrand Schnerb, Guy II de Pontailler is a good example of a man devoted to the prince's cause.

On January 28, 1364, Guy de Pontailler was appointed marshal of the Duchy of Burgundy in a letter written by duke Philip and confirmed the following year:

"Philip II the Bold, Duke of Burgundy; Greetings to all those who will see these letters. We record this letter about January in the year 1363. (Note: that is, January 1364 new style) By these presents, we accept and welcome in our Mareschal our beloved and loyal Knight Messire Guy de Pontailler to the rights, emoluments and profits accustomed as much as it will. Please be advised that we have granted full power, authority, and a special mandate to perform all duties and responsibilities associated with the position of our Marshal. We give this mandate to all our subjects, and request that the others obey and diligently listen to the said Messire Guy, and provide him with advice, comfort and assistance if required. In witness whereof we have set our seal to these letters. Given at Talant on the seventh day of January in the year of our Lord 1364. (Note: that is, on January 7, 1365) Thus signed, by Monseigneur le Duc, J. Blanchet."

The duke then asked him “to wage war for him”.

The position of Marshal of Burgundy had been vacant since 1361. The marshal was the highest-ranking military officer under the direct administration of the duke. He therefore had to be dedicated and a member of the upper nobility, wealthy enough to meet the expenses of the position, and with good military experience. The marshal's “main responsibility is the control of the men of war (...) [he] organizes the watches [reviews], checks their equipment, judges the quality of their mounts, ensures their remount [return] after combat, organizes their travel and accommodation”.

==== Facts of arms ====
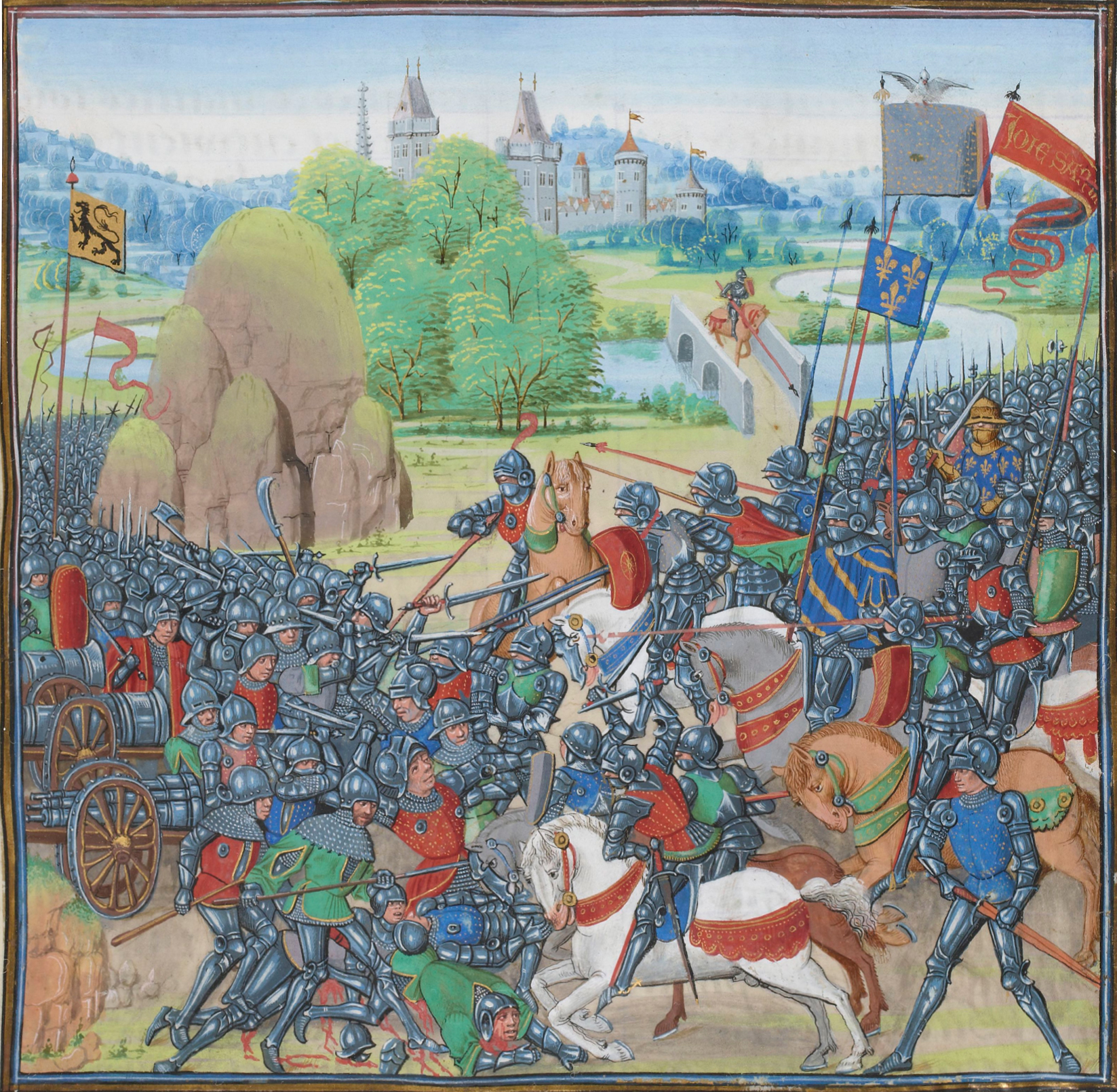
The battle of Roosebeke, in which Guy II certainly took part.

The same year, he took part in an expedition across the Saône against the Count of Montbéliard. He founded forty lancers and ten archers. He frequently traveled from Pontailler to Saugey or Laperrières, issuing orders to the companies stationed there not to harm the Duke's subjects. Marshal Guy II de Pontailler was constantly on the move, as he was the only one willing to take the risk of negotiating with the Routiers. In his words, "No man would dare go before them if I wasn't there." He led several successful attacks against these mercenaries, and in particular against one of their captains, Guillaume Pot. It was on this occasion that he took many prisoners, from whom he hoped to obtain a ransom (estimated at between two and 3,000 florins). However, these prisoners, housed in his hotel in Dijon, were claimed by the city's bailiff, Hugues Aubriot, who subsequently had them hanged. Guy II was not compensated, and so lost all hope of earning a substantial nest egg. This misfortune befell him again later, in 1368 or 1369, after the defeat of a mercenary captain by the name of Jacques Flour, captured with criminals by Guy II, who was hoping to obtain four to 5,000 francs in ransom. As the criminals were wanted by the bailiff of Autun, Guy II handed them over to him, without compensation. Jacques Flour was exchanged by the marshal for a Burgundian knight held prisoner by the English.

In 1364-1365, as part of the Hundred Years' War, Guy II laid siege to Villaines. According to Gabriel Dumay, he also made a pilgrimage to the Holy Land.

In the 1370s, Nicolas de Fontenay, seigneur de Saint-Liébaut, bailli de Troyes and ducal grand officer, succeeded Saladin d'Anglure, and took over the lands of Chennegy and Valcon from Guy de Pontailler, marshal of Burgundy, who was himself involved in metallurgy in the Saône Valley.

In August 1372, Guy de Pontailler presented Duke Philip, in whose company he was serving against the English in Guyenne, with a petition listing the military and material losses he had suffered during his eight years as marshal. The marshal complained that he had been poorly paid his wages, which ranged from two to six francs a day, depending on the mission. He also protested to the Duke against the irregular payment of his pay, which was intended to “support the state of his person” (that of the Prince, which at the time amounted to entertainment expenses, notes Bertrand Schnerb), to the tune of 100 francs a month. Finally, he demanded reimbursement for the horses that died in his service (nearly 44 in eight years), by the customary practice known as “restor de chevaux”. It seems that Guy II had agreed to make heavy advances to his duke: he would have paid 400 francs to the squire Jacquot de Chamblanc (who had given his stronghold to the duke) and 4,500 francs to Arnaud de Cervole, known as l'Archiprêtre (to return the château de la Vesvre, which he had kept as a pledge). However, Guy II, who stood surety in 1364 (as did the Bailli d'Autun), was never reimbursed.

In 1368, Guy II rode alongside the Duke to oppose the Grandes Compagnies returning from Spain, following their defeat at the battle of Nájera. His charge also required him to secure the roads in the territory guarded by Olivier de Clisson, “who were not in great obedience”, a man once hired by the king but who later turned to the Grandes Compagnies.

In 1369, he accompanied the Duke to Artois to block an English advance led by the Duke of Lancaster.

In 1371-1372, he took part in expeditions to Bourbonnais and Auvergne, and then to Guyenne, again alongside the Duke of Burgundy, but also with the Duke of Berry.

==== Flanders and death ====
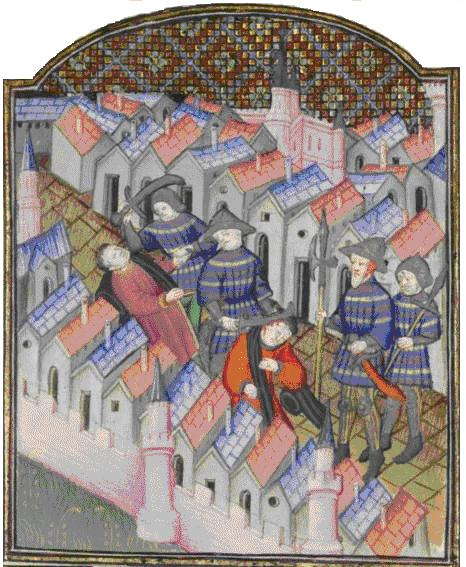
The first Ghent revolt, manuscript from Jean Froissart's Chroniques, 15th century

In November 1379, Guy II accompanied Philip the Bold to Arras. The Duke wished to act as an intermediary between the Flemish count's power and the Ghent rebels, in what was the early stages of a war in Flanders. Guy II's prestige was confirmed in 1381 when the Duke appointed him “Governor General” of the Duchy of Burgundy and the lands it held in the county.

In 1384, after the truce of Leulinghem, the Duke took military measures to ensure the security of the county of Flanders, acquired from Burgundy. He, therefore, appointed Guy de Pontailler and Jean, his younger brother, “governors of the country of Flanders”, in collegiality with one of Louis de Male's close advisors, a representative of a major Flanders lineage.

In 1385, alongside Admiral Jean de Vienne, he founded a chapel at Mont-Roland.

Guy II de Pontailler seems to have died in 1392. According to Bertrand Schnerb, he played an “essential role in the Burgundian government”. Indeed, it was Philip the Bold's principate that gave the Duchy of Burgundy “a long period of peace which, for the most part, lasted from 1369 to 1410: 42 war-free years which were Burgundy's good fortune”.

== Coat of arms ==

Blazon:

“Gules, a golden lion armed and langued azure”.

== Possessions ==
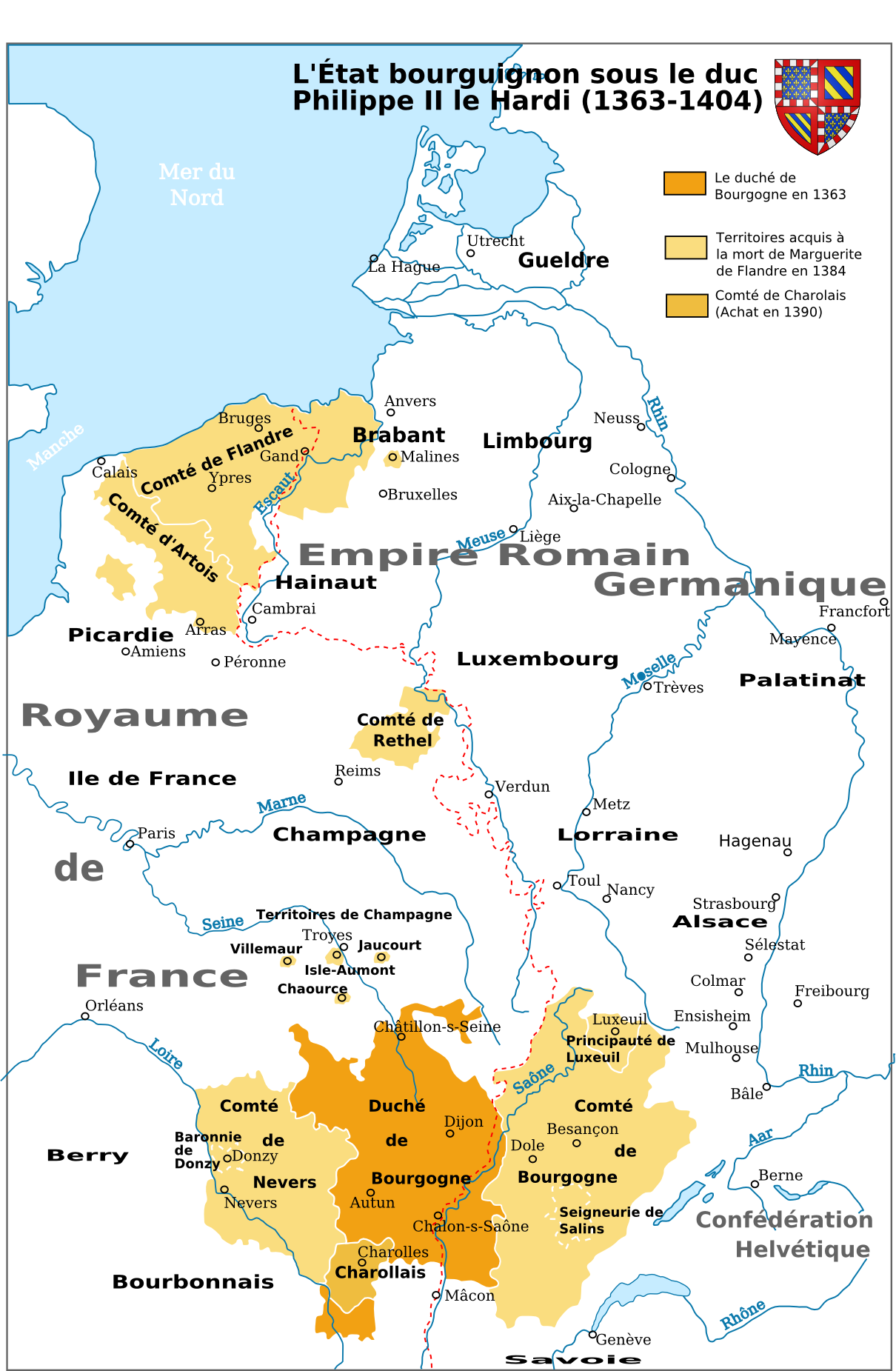
The Burgundian state under Duke Philip the Bold and Marshal Guy II de Ponrailler, 1363-1404

His two most important acquisitions were the seigneury of Heuilley-sur-Saône, from Guillaume de la Borde, esquire (1368), and part of the seigneury of Talmay, under the fief of Pesmes, from Guyot d'Aubigny (purchase of December 20, 1384, according to Gabriel Dumay).

Guy II had suffered heavy losses due to the Duke's enemies riding over his lands, particularly those located “across the Saône”. He thus lost a seigneury, which was “arse” (burnt), and which brought him 400 florins in annual rent. Its inhabitants refused to return, for fear of being vandalized again. His land at Montsinjon had also been destroyed. Add to this the fact that he was constantly having to advance money to ensure his position as Marshal of Burgundy, advances never repaid by the Duke, and Guy II was forced to go into debt and sell “150 livrées de terre” (a property earning him 150 livres a year). A letter from Guy II to the Duke has survived, in which he begged the Duke for financial help:

“If you please, my most dreaded lord, provide for me on this, in such a way that I do not have to sell my inheritance."

According to Bertrand Schnerb, Guy II's financial situation was not quite so difficult. He endured a period of indebtedness, from which he recovered. He received a gift of 500 francs from the Duke as a reward for the losses he had incurred, and then obtained gratifications, pensions and compensation of all kinds from him. Finally, in 1370, Guy II significantly rebuilt and expanded his estate.

== Historiography ==
Only one study on Guy II de Pontailler, entitled Guy de Pontailler, sire de Talmay, maréchal de Bourgogne 1364-1392 and dating from 1907, is relatively fictionalized. It is a memoir by the Société bourguignonne de géographie et d'histoire, written by Dijon scholar Gabriel Dumay.

== See also ==
- History of Burgundy
- Philip the Bold
- Duke of Burgundy

== Bibliography ==
- Dumay, Gabriel (1907). Guy de Pontailler, sire de Talmay, maréchal de Bourgogne 1364-1392, Jacquot et Floret, coll. « Mémoires de la société bourguignonne de géographie et d'histoire ».
- Plancher, Urbain (1748). Histoire générale et particulière de Bourgogne avec des notes, des dissertations et des preuves justificatives, tome 3, A. de Fay.
- Barante, Prosper Brugière (1826). Histoire des ducs de Bourgogne de la maison de Valois, 1364-1477. Paris: Ladvocat.
- Schnerb, Bertrand (2005). L'État bourguignon coll. « Tempus ». Paris: Perrin. ISBN 978-2-262-02360-7.
- Schnerb, Bertrand (2000). L'honneur de la maréchaussée: maréchalat et maréchaux en Bourgogne, des origines à la fin du xve siècle, coll. « Burgundica ». Brepols. ISBN 978-2-503-51038-5.
- Richard, Jean (1957). Le gouverneur de Bourgogne au temps des ducs Valois Mémoires de la Société pour l'Histoire du Droit et des Institutions des anciens pays bourguignons, comtois et romands.
