= Robert VIII Bertrand de Bricquebec =

French diplomat and soldier

Personal details
- Born: c. 1273
- Died: 3 August 1348
- Known for: Marshal of France (1325-1344)

Arms of Robert Bertrand: Or, a lion rampant vert, armed and langued gules, a crown argent.

Robert VIII Bertrand de Bricquebec (c.1273-3 August 1348), also known as Robert Bertrand, Baron of Bricquebec, Viscount of Roncheville, was a 14th century Norman noble. He served as Marshal of France from 1325 until 1344.

== Biography ==
Bertrand was the eldest son of Robert VII Bertrand de Bricquebec, Baron de Bricquebec and Phillipa de Clermont-Nesle. His brother Guillaume was bishop of Noyon (1331-1338), bishop of Bayeux (1338-1347) and bishop of Beauvais (1347-1356).

In 1285, Robert went on crusade to Aragon, as a squire to his uncle Clermont de Nesle, following the massacres of the Sicilian Vespers in 1282. The French army led by King Philip III of France entered Italy, while another smaller army provided a diversion in Spain. Figueras, Castillon and Girona were taken. It is reported that during the battle of Girona in September 1285, Robert seriously wounded King Peter III of Aragon, who died soon afterwards of the wounds.

In 1321, Robert Bertrand was sent on mission in Lorraine to the bishop of Verdun and Luxembourg, regarding the bishopric of Verdun. A dispute had broken out between Edward I of Bar and John I of Bohemia, resulting in a war between the two protagonists. The mediation resulted in a short-lived truce. During August 1322, Robert accompanied his father-in-law Henri de Sully and other French knights into the service of King Edward II of England. They fought for England against King Robert I of Scotland. During the decisive meeting at the Battle of Old Byland on 14 October 1322 in Yorkshire, near Byland Abbey, the French knights remained on the battlefield after the English were defeated and were made prisoners. On 30 May 1323, a truce was signed between Edward II and Robert I, with a ransom being paid for the release of the French prisoners and on 3 June 1324, Bertrand and the surviving French knights embarked at Dover to return to France.

In 1325, Bertrand was appointed Marshal of France by King Charles IV of France. Bertrand was dispatched in 1325-1326 to Flanders to calm a peasant rebellion. In 1327, Robert went to the Agenais and the Bordelais to pacify these two regions. In 1328, the Marshal returned to Flanders following a new revolt of the Flemish, this time accompanied by the new King Philip VI of France. The Flemish rebels commanded by Nicolaas Zannekin were annihilated by the French royal army at the Battle of Cassel. In 1336, he became a member of the Council of the King in Paris, witnessing and signing a treaty of alliance with King Alfonso XI of Castile.

Following the outbreak of the Hundred Years' War between France and England, Bertrand was ordered to occupy the island of Guernsey from the English. Robert was appointed as Lord of Guernsey, a position he held until Guernsey was recaptured by the English in July 1345. He took part in the defense of Tournai in 1339. In 1341, the War of Succession of Brittany broke out with Charles de Blois, Duke of Brittany requesting help. Philip VI, Charles' uncle, sent a French army including Bertrand to Brittany. Robert resigned his office as Marshall of France in March 1344, aged 71, remaining a member of the King's Council.

The English under King Edward III of England landed in Normandy on 12 July 1346, at Saint-Vaast-la-Hougue. Bertrand, with his eldest son Robert IX and 300 men vainly tried to prevent the landing. Robert was injured along with his son and had to retire with only 30 survivors of his troop. The English army marched to Caen, where Bertrand had sought refuge with his brother Guillaume, Governor of the Chateau of Caen. The English looted and sacked Caen, with the city burned, 95 French knights and Norman prisoners and 2,500 dead. The castle held out and after the main English army left, the castle defenders sallied out and defeated the English occupying force.

He was nicknamed "The Green Lion Knight", after his coat of arms. He died in 1348 and was buried in the Saint-Sauveur Church of Beaumont-en-Auge.

== Family ==
Bertrand married Marie, the eldest daughter of Henri de Sully, Baron de Chales and grand butler of France, and Jeanne de Vendome, they are known to have had the following known issue:

- Dame Jeanne Bertrand, known as the Elder (born in 1320), receives Bricquebec and marries Guillaume Paynel.
- Philippa Bertrand, is married secondly to Guy IV of Roche-Guyon.
- Robert IX Bertrand, born in 1321, was killed at the age of 25 at the Battle of Crecy on 26 August 1346, without issue.
- Guillaume, married to Jeanne Bacon, was killed at the Battle of Mauron in Brittany on 14 August 1352, without issue.
- Jeanne Bertrand, (1325-?), Viscountess of Roncheville (which she inherits), married to Gérard Chabot, then secondly in 1353 to Guy IV of Roche-Guyon (1315-1372).

The King Henry IV of France was a descendant of Bertrand through Philippa in her second marriage to Guy IV of Roche-Guyon (Castle of La Roche-Guyon)
