= William, Lord of Sully =

Count of Blois and Chartres from 1102 to 1107

William
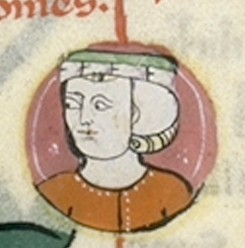
- Born: c. 1085
- Died: c. 1150
- Noble family: House of Blois; House of Sully (founder)
- Spouse: Agnes of Sully
- Issue: Eudes Archambaud; Ranier (Rodolphus); Margaret; Henry of Sully; Elizabeth
- Father: Stephen, Count of Blois
- Mother: Adela of Normandy

William the Simple (c. 1085 – c. 1150) was Count of Blois and Count of Chartres from 1102 to 1107, and jure uxoris Lord of Sully.

== Biography ==
William was the eldest son of Stephen, Count of Blois and Adela of Normandy, daughter of William the Conqueror. William was the older brother of Theobald II, Count of Champagne; Stephen, King of England; and Henry, Bishop of Winchester.

In the absence of male issue to Henry I of England, William was the eldest legitimate grandson of William the Conqueror. He would thus have been the principal rival to Henry's daughter Matilda to inherit the throne after Henry's death. However, William was not considered as a candidate for the English crown. Several historians have taken the view that he was passed over because of mental deficiency; (Note: LoPrete states William's mental incapacity comes from an over reliance on late-12th- and 13th-century narrative sources, which had simplified events.) hence his soubriquet "William the Simple". Though widely argued, this has never been clearly substantiated.

William was at first groomed to inherit the comital thrones of Blois and Chartres, and was designated count shortly before his father's departure on his second crusade in 1102. During his mother's dispute with the Chartres cathedral chapter (1102–1104), William burst in the cathedral demanding the burghers of Chartres take an oath to kill the canons, harass Ivo of Chartres, and secure episcopal lands.

William was soon removed from wide-ranging comital duties by his mother, and when her second son Theobald came of age, around 1107, Adela elevated him to the position of Count of Blois-Chartres. William retired to his wife's lands in Sully. Despite his removal from comital duties, he supported his brother Theobald's familial ambitions.

== Marriage ==
On 13 November 1104, William married Agnes of Sully, heiress to the lordship of Sully-sur-Loire, chosen as his wife by his mother, Adela.

Children of Agnes and William:

- Eudes Archambaud
- Ranier (Rodolphus), Prior of La Charité-sur-Loire, Abbot of Cluny
- Margaret (c. 1105–1145). She married Henry I, Count of Eu, about 1122.
- Henry, Abbot of Fécamp, Bishop-designate of Salisbury, and Archbishop-elect of York
- Elizabeth (died 1128), Abbess of Sainte-Trinité

== Sources ==
- Crouch, David (2000). The Reign of King Stephen; 1135–1154. Pearson Education Lmt.
- Davis, R.H.C. (1990). King Stephen. Longman Group UK.
- Evergates, Theodore (2007). The Aristocracy in the County of Champagne, 1100-1300. University of Pennsylvania Press.
- LoPrete, Kimberly A. (1990a). "Adela of Blois: Familial Alliances and Female Lordship". In Evergates, Theodore (ed.). Aristocratic Women in Medieval France. University of Pennsylvania Press.
- LoPrete, Kimberly A. (1990b). "The Anglo-Norman Card of Adela of Blois". Albion: A Quarterly Journal Concerned with British Studies. 22, No. 4 (Winter) (4). The North American Conference on British Studies: 569–589. doi:10.2307/4051390. JSTOR 4051390.
- LoPrete, Kimberly A. (2007). Adela of Blois: countess and lord (c.1067-1137). Four Courts Press.
- Nitze, William Albert; Jenkins, Thomas Atkinson (1972). Le haut livre du Graal: Commentary and notes. Phaeton Press.

William, Lord of Sully House of Blois Born: c. 1085 Died: c. 1150
Preceded by Stephen, Count of Blois	Count of Blois and Chartres; 1102–1107	Succeeded by Theobald IV
Preceded by Gilles II of Sully	Lord of Sully	Succeeded by Eudes Archambaud
