= Monnières =

Monnières is the name of the following communes in France:

- Monnières, Jura, in the Jura department
- Monnières, Loire-Atlantique, in the Loire-Atlantique department
