= Cardinals created by Urban III =

Catholic appointments from 1186 to 1187

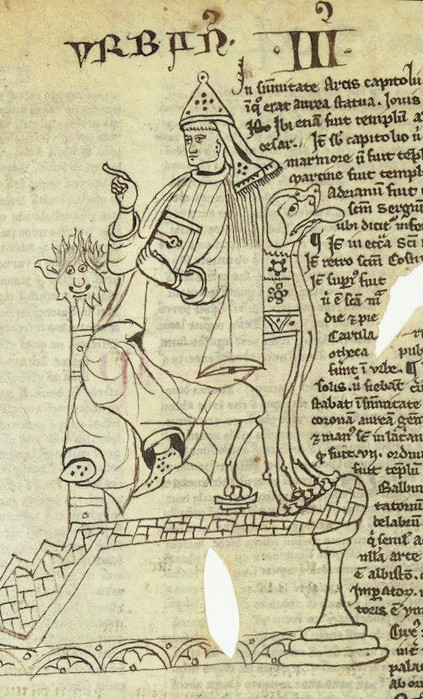
Pope Urban III in a 13th-century miniature

Pope Urban III (r. 1185–1187) created five cardinals in two consistories held during his pontificate.

== 31 May 1186 ==
- Roberto
- Henry de Sully O.Cist.
- Ugo Geremei
- Gandolfo O.S.B.

== 1187 ==
- Boson

== Sources ==
- Miranda, Salvador. "Consistories for the creation of Cardinals, 12th Century (1099-1198): Urban III (1185-1187)". The Cardinals of the Holy Roman Church. Florida International University. OCLC 53276621.
