= Agnes of Sully =

French noblewoman

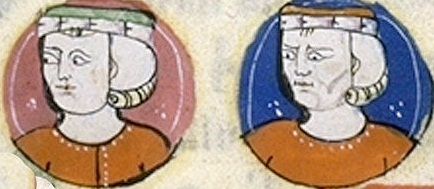
Agnes' spouse and brother-in-law Theobald II, Count of Champagne

Agnes of Sully (French: Agnès) was a French noblewoman and Lady of Sully. Agnesʻ parents were Lord Gilles II of Sully and Edelburge of Bourges, whilst Agnesʻ husband was William, Count of Sully.

Children of Agnes and William:

- Eudes Archambaud
- Ranier (Rodolphus), Prior of La Charité-sur-Loire, Abbot of Cluny
- Henry of Sully (died 1189)
- Margaret (Marguerite)
- Elizabeth of Sully, Abbess of Sainte-Trinité
