= Eudes Archambaud =

Lord of Sully

- Spouse: Matilda of Baugency
- Children: Giles III; Henry; Odo
- Parent(s): Agnes, Lady of Sully; William, Lord of Sully
- Family: House of Blois; House of Sully

Eudes Archambaud was a French nobleman of the 12th century.

Eudes (Odo) was the son of William of Blois (c. 1085 – c. 1150) and Agnes, Lady of Sully.

The two brothers of Eudes (Odo), Ralph and Henry, both entered the Church, leaving Eudes (Odo) as sole secular son and successor to their parents' holdings.

Lord Eudes (Odo) was married to Matilda of Baugency and the couple had three sons:

- Giles III, Lord of Sully, successor of his father
- Henry, Archbishop of Bourges
- Odo, Bishop of Paris

== Sources ==
- Devailly, Guy (1973). Le Berry du X siecle au milieu du XIII (in French). Mouton & Co.
