= Sampans, Jura =

Sampans
- Commune
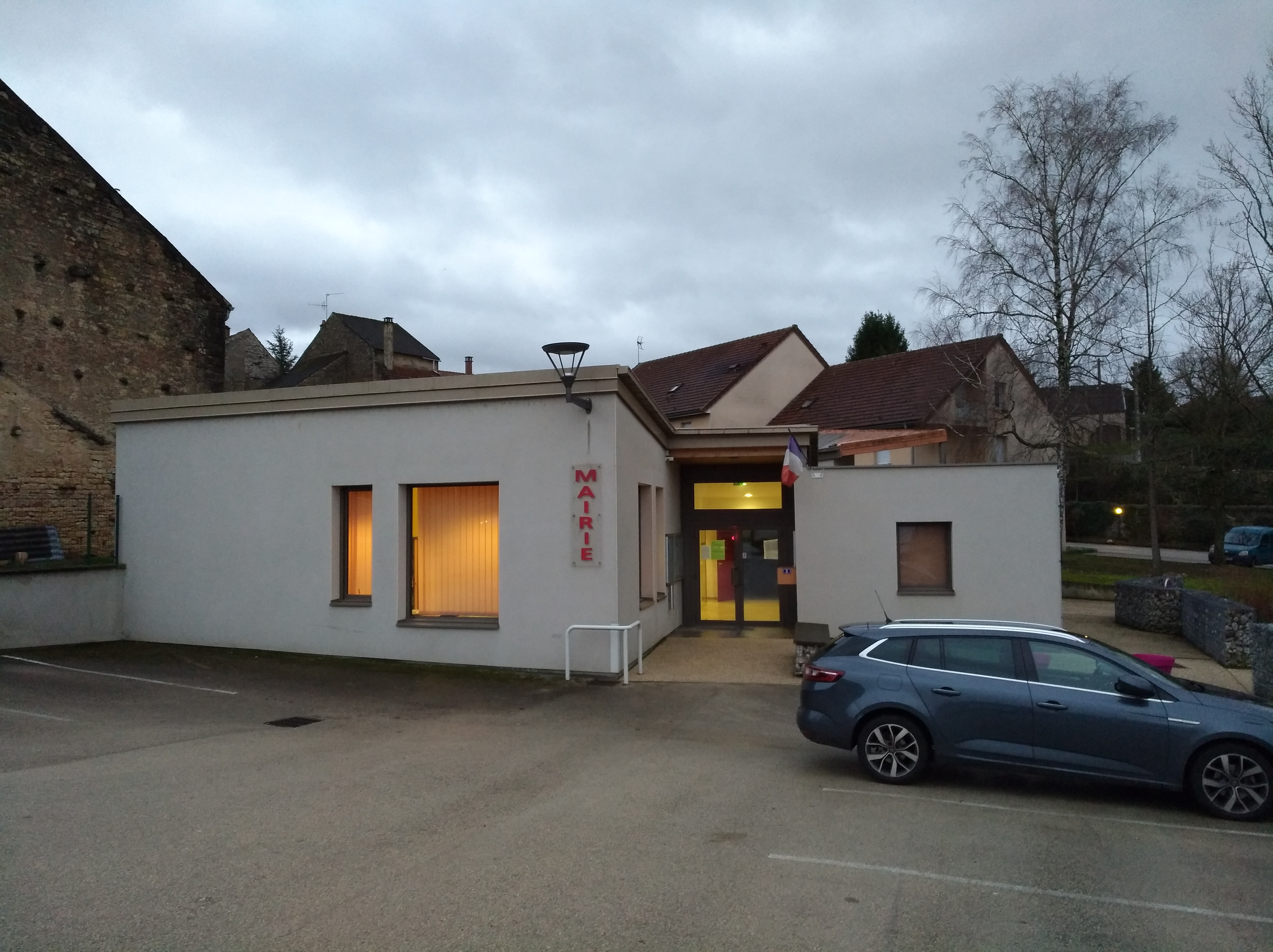
- The town hall in Sampans
- Location of Sampans
- Location within France Location within Bourgogne-Franche-Comté
- Coordinates: 47°07′37″N 5°27′28″E
- Country: France
- Region: Bourgogne-Franche-Comté
- Department: Jura
- Arrondissement: Dole
- Canton: Dole-1
- Intercommunality: CA Grand Dole

Government
  - Mayor (2020–2026): Gérard Ginet
- Area^{1}: 7.58 km^{2} (2.93 sq mi)
- Highest elevation: 342 m (1,122 ft)
- Lowest elevation: 193 m (633 ft)
- Population (2023): 1,106
  - Density: 146/km^{2} (378/sq mi)
- Time zone: UTC+01:00 (CET)
  - Summer (DST): UTC+02:00 (CEST)
- INSEE/Postal code: 39501 /39100
- ^{1} French Land Register data, which excludes lakes, ponds, glaciers > 1 km^{2} (0.386 sq mi or 247 acres) and river estuaries.

Sampans (French pronunciation: [sɑ̃pɑ̃]) is a commune in the Jura department in the Bourgogne-Franche-Comté region in eastern France.

== Population ==
Historical population
Year	Pop.	±% p.a.
1968	500	—
1975	539	+1.08%
1982	668	+3.11%
1990	675	+0.13%
1999	708	+0.53%
2007	800	+1.54%
2012	999	+4.54%
2017	1,165	+3.12%
2023	1,106	−0.86%
Source: INSEE

== See also ==
- Communes of the Jura department
