= Battle of Old Byland =

Battle during the Wars of Scottish Independence (1322)

- Part of First War of Scottish Independence
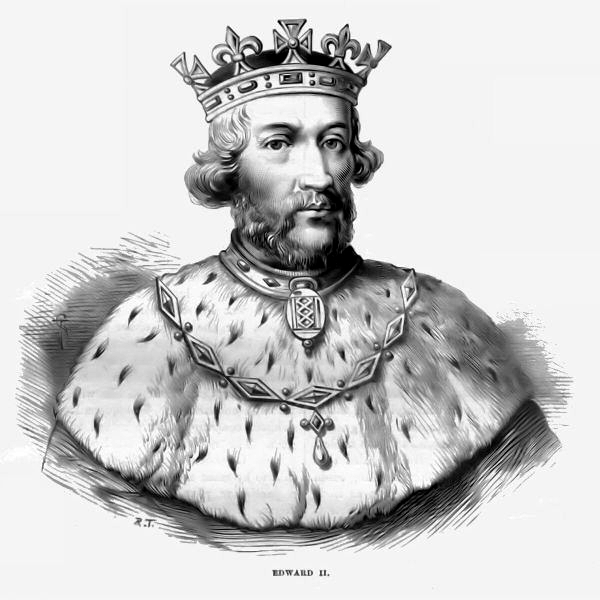
- Edward II- by Cassell
Date	14 October 1322
Location	Sutton Bank, Hambleton Hills, near Old Byland and Scawton, Yorkshire, England 54.227°N 1.159°W
Result	Scottish victory

Belligerents
Kingdom of Scotland	Kingdom of England

Commanders and leaders
Robert the Bruce (Scotland) James Douglas (Scotland) Thomas Randolph (Scotland) Walter Stewart	Edward II (England) John of Brittany (surrendered) (England) Henri de Sully (surrendered) (England) Thomas Ughtred (surrendered)

Strength
6,000–8,000, though only a few thousand engaged in the main action	8,000–10,000, though only a few thousand engaged in the main action

Casualties and losses
Unknown, probably slight	Unknown, but significant; several senior commanders captured

The Battle of Old Byland (also known as the Battle of Byland Abbey and the Battle of Byland Moor) was a significant encounter between Scots and English troops in Yorkshire in October 1322, forming part of the Wars of Scottish Independence. It was a victory for the Scots, the most significant since Bannockburn, and came close to resulting in the capture of King Edward II. Historians long placed the fighting to the east, at Scawton Moor between Rievaulx and Byland abbeys, but archaeological and topographical study by the Battlefields Trust has concluded that the main action was actually fought some distance away at Sutton Bank, where a medieval track climbed the escarpment of the Hambleton Hills.

== Background to the battle ==
=== Raids and revenge ===
Ever since Robert Bruce's victory at the Battle of Bannockburn in 1314, the Scots had taken the initiative in the wars with England, raiding deep into the north of the country repeatedly and with comparative ease to attempt to force the English to the peace-table. The English king, Edward II seemed incapable of dealing with the problem, distracted, as he often was, in a political struggle with his own barons and refused to even begin peace negotiations with the Scots which would have required recognizing Robert the Bruce as King of the Scots. In early 1322, the situation had become critical, with some senior English noblemen, headed by Thomas of Lancaster, preparing to enter into an alliance with the Scots.

It seems unlikely that Bruce had much confidence in Lancaster, who referred to himself as 'King Arthur' in his negotiations with the Scots, but he was quick to take advantage of the threat of civil war in England. Scarcely had the truce of 1319 expired in January 1322 than Sir James Douglas, Thomas Randolph, 1st Earl of Moray and Walter Stewart came over the border on a large-scale attack on the north-east. The three commanders fanned out across the region: Douglas to Hartlepool, Moray to Darlington and Stewart to Richmond. Lancaster with his army at Pontefract did nothing to stop them. Edward ignored the Scots, instructing his lieutenant in the north, Sir Andrew Harclay, the governor of Carlisle, to concentrate his efforts against the rebel barons, whom he finally defeated at the Battle of Boroughbridge. In the wake of this the Scots raiders slipped back across the border.

=== Edward's invasion ===
Boroughbridge was a new beginning for Edward. The baronial opposition had been defeated and tainted with treason: the king had at last enjoyed his long-awaited revenge for the murder of Piers Gaveston. This was the high point of his reign and, emboldened by this rare triumph, he decided to embark on what was to be his last invasion of Scotland. It was to be a disaster.

By the time Edward was ready to begin his advance in early August, Bruce was more than ready. He deployed his usual tactics: crops were destroyed and livestock removed and his army withdrawn north of the River Forth. In all of Lothian the English are said only to have found one lame cow, causing the Earl of Surrey to remark: "This is the dearest beef I ever saw. It surely has cost a thousand pounds and more!" In the Scalacronica, Sir Thomas Grey describes the whole campaign thus:

The king marched upon Edinburgh, where at Leith there came such a sickness and famine upon the common soldiers of that great army, that they were forced to beat a retreat for want of food; at which time the king's light horse were defeated by James de Douglas. None dared leave the main body to seek food by forage, so greatly were the English harassed and worn out by fighting that before they arrived in Newcastle there was such a murrain in the army for want of food, that they were obliged of necessity to disband.

Holyrood Abbey in Edinburgh and the border abbeys of Melrose and Dryburgh were destroyed in revenge by the English. The invasion had achieved nothing of any strategic use. More seriously, the effect on national morale of the ignominious retreat of a starving army was almost as bad as the defeat at Bannockburn. Worse was to follow, for, as usual, an English retreat was the signal for yet another Scottish attack.

== The conflict at Old Byland ==
Bruce crossed the Solway in the west, making his way in a south-easterly direction towards Yorkshire, bringing many troops recruited in Argyll and the Isles. The boldness and speed of the attack, known as The Great Raid of 1322, soon exposed Edward to the dangers on his own land. On his return from Scotland, the king had taken up residence at Rievaulx Abbey with Queen Isabella. Only on 13 October did Edward learn how close the Scots were; he ordered the Earl of Richmond to post a strong advance guard along the escarpment of the Hambleton Hills, particularly at Sutton Bank, to hold the high ground and buy time for reinforcements. The Scots made a forced overnight march from Northallerton hoping to catch the English unprepared, but on the morning of 14 October they found the heights already strongly held.

To dislodge the English from what appeared an unassailable position, Bruce split his force: while Douglas and Moray engaged the main position from the front, a detachment of Highlanders scaled the escarpment's more lightly defended cliffs to the south, at a point still known locally as Scotch Corner, and fell upon Richmond's rear.

Resistance crumbled and the Battle of Old Byland turned into a complete and bloody rout of the English, who broke and fled toward Old Byland and Scawton. Richmond himself made a bold attempt to stand his ground before being overwhelmed and taken prisoner, as were Henri de Sully, Grand Butler of France, Sir Ralph Cobham ("the best knight in England") and Sir Thomas Ughtred. Many others were killed in flight. Edward—"ever chicken-hearted and luckless in war"—fled Rievaulx and rode for Bridlington in search of a ship, leaving behind his treasure, baggage, and the Great Seal of England to the victorious Scots.

== Aftermath ==
The defeat marked the effective end of Edward's ambitions in Scotland. In its wake, Andrew Harclay, the same commander who had won Boroughbridge for the king only months earlier, opened independent negotiations with Bruce for a settlement recognising Scottish independence, without royal authorisation, convinced that England could no longer sustain the war. He was arrested, tried for treason, and executed in 1323.

== Evaluation ==
"After Byland", says Sir Thomas Gray, "the Scots were so fierce and their chiefs so daring, and the English so cowed, that it was no otherwise between them than as a hare before greyhounds". This was a significant victory for the Scots after their success at Myton-on-Swale and was followed five years later by their victory at Stanhope Park over Edward III.

== Historiography and commemoration ==
Byland remained comparatively little studied until archaeological survey work, beginning in 1996 and coordinated by the Battlefields Trust, revised the long-accepted location of the fighting from Scawton Moor to Sutton Bank. In October 2022, on the battle's 700th anniversary, the North York Moors National Park Authority unveiled a memorial stone and interpretation panel near the top of Sutton Bank, unveiled by Adam Bruce, a descendant of Robert the Bruce.

Harry Pearson's book-length study, Clash of Crowns: The Battle of Byland 1322, first published in 2022 and reissued by Pen & Sword in 2024, situates the battle within a long narrative of Anglo-Scottish relations. Reviewing the book for the Society for Medieval Military History, historian Ilana Krug praised it as an accessible account that highlights an "overlooked and neglected" episode, while noting that its narrative leans toward a pro-Scottish interpretation, drawing on a relatively narrow range of secondary scholarship, and that its referencing of primary sources is at points incomplete.

== Sources ==
=== Primary ===
- Barbour, John, The Bruce, trans. A. A. H. Douglas, 1964.
- Gray, Sir Thomas, Scalicronica, trans. H. Maxwell, 1913.
- The Lanercost Chronicle, trans. H. Maxwell, 1913.
- Giovanni Villani Nuova Cronica. Book X, Chapter CLXXX.

=== Secondary ===
- Barrow, G. W. S. Robert Bruce and the Community of the Realm of Scotland, 1964.
- Barron, E. M. The Scottish War of Independence, 1934.
- Pearson, Harry (2 May 2024). Clash of Crowns – The Battle of Byland 1322: Robert the Bruce's Forgotten Victory. Pen & Sword Military. ISBN 978-1-3990-3591-0.
- Scammel, J., Robert I and the North of England, in The English Historical Review, vol. 73, 1958.
