= Champvans, Jura =

Commune in Bourgogne-Franche-Comté, France

Champvans
- Commune
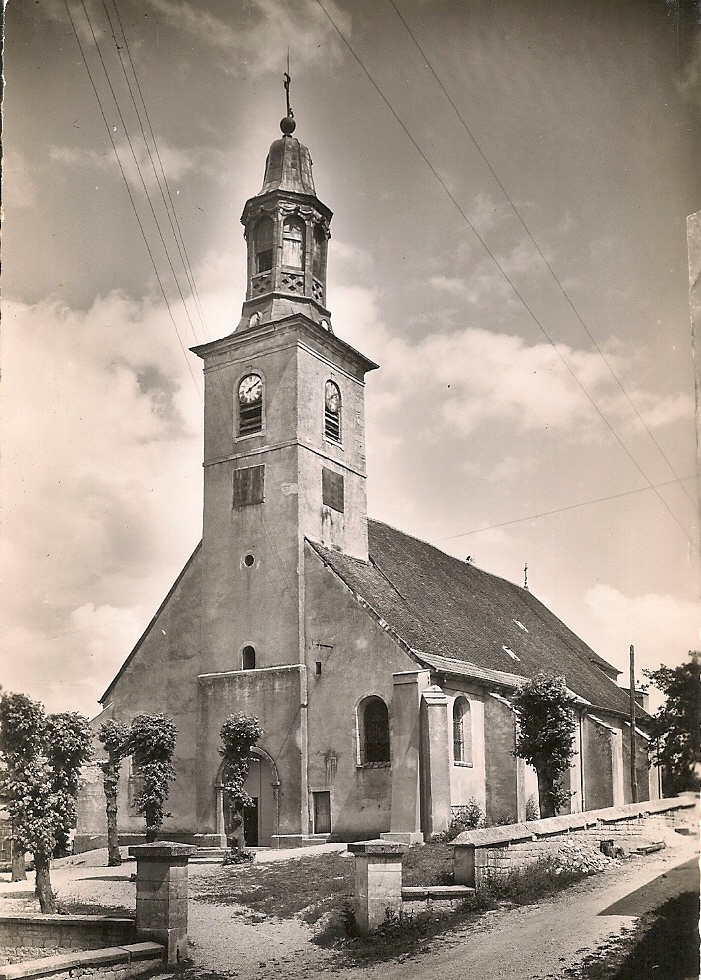
- The church in Champvans, in the early 20th century

- Coat of arms
- Location of Champvans
- Location within France Location within Bourgogne-Franche-Comté
- Coordinates: 47°06′21″N 5°26′10″E
- Country: France
- Region: Bourgogne-Franche-Comté
- Department: Jura
- Arrondissement: Dole
- Canton: Dole-1
- Intercommunality: CA Grand Dole

Government
  - Mayor (2020–2026): Dominique Michaud
- Area^{1}: 14.22 km^{2} (5.49 sq mi)
- Highest elevation: 290 m (950 ft)
- Lowest elevation: 188 m (617 ft)
- Population (2023): 1,460
  - Density: 103/km^{2} (266/sq mi)
- Time zone: UTC+01:00 (CET)
  - Summer (DST): UTC+02:00 (CEST)
- INSEE/Postal code: 39101 /39100
- ^{1} French Land Register data, which excludes lakes, ponds, glaciers > 1 km^{2} (0.386 sq mi or 247 acres) and river estuaries.

Champvans (French pronunciation: [ʃɑ̃vɑ̃]) is a commune in the Jura department in Bourgogne-Franche-Comté in eastern France.

== Heraldry ==
Champvans	Divided: 1st half divided azure semé of billets or with a lion of the same, 2nd gules with an oak branch vert, fructed with three pieces argent and placed fesswise; overall a silver division charged with the inscription "Champvans" sable and superimposed on the partition.

== Population ==
Historical population
Year	Pop.	±% p.a.
1968	1,339	—
1975	1,368	+0.31%
1982	1,330	−0.40%
1990	1,300	−0.28%
1999	1,362	+0.52%
2007	1,402	+0.36%
2012	1,324	−1.14%
2017	1,414	+1.32%
2023	1,460	+0.53%
Source: INSEE

== See also ==
- Communes of the Jura department
