= Henry de Sully (archbishop of Bourges) =

Personal life
- Born: Suliac, Berry, France
- Died: 11 September 1199 Bourges
- Parent(s): Eudes Archambaud (father), Matilda of Baugency (mother)

Religious life
- Religion: Roman Catholic
- Consecration: 1183

Henry de Sully (died 11 September 1199, Bourges), was a 12th-century French cardinal. As a member of the Cistercian Order, he was named Archbishop of Bourges before becoming being named Cardinal by Pope Urban III in 1186.

== Biography ==
Henry, born at Suliac, Berry, France, was a younger son of Eudes Archambaud, lord of Sully-sur-Loire, and Matilda of Baugency. Henry had two brothers—father's successor, Gilles III of Sully and Eudes of Sully, who would become Bishop of Paris. Henry entered the Cistercian Order and became abbot of Notre-Dame de Saint-Lieu. In 1183, Henry was elected patriarch and Archbishop of Bourges. Urban III named Henry a cardinal in 1186, at the consistory of Pentecost Saturday. Henry was legate in Aquitaine. He did participate in any papal elections.

In 1199, Henry served as mediator of a dispute between Guy II, Count of Auvergne and his brother Robert of Auvergne, Bishop of Clermont, that resulted in a state of civil war in Auvergne. The mediation failed and Guy was excommunicated. Following Henry's death, Henry’s brother Eudes, Bishop of Paris, was called upon to nominate a successor, and finding consensus impossible among the factions, he prayed for divine guidance and drew lots, selecting (future Saint) William of Donjeon, who was duly elected.

Alain de Lille would dedicate his Liber poenitenitalis to Henry de Sully.

== See also ==
- Cardinals created by Urban III

== Sources ==
- Baring-Gould, Sabine (1877). The Lives of the Saints (3rd ed.). John Hodges.
- Devailly, Guy (1973). Le Berry du X siecle au milieu du XIII (in French). Mouton & Co.
- Krochalis, Jeanne E. (1995). "Alain de Lille". In Kibler, William W.; Zinn, Grover A. (eds.). Medieval France: An Encyclopedia. Garland Publishing, Ltd. pp. 17–18.
