= William I of Sancerre =

William I of Sancerre (French: Guillaume de Sancerre, ca. 1176 – 1217) was the second Count of Sancerre, Lord of Saint-Brisson and La Ferté-Loupière from 1191 until his death. He was the eldest son of Stephen I, Count of Sancerre. In 1217 he accompanied his brother-in-law, Peter II of Courtenay, who had just been elected Latin Emperor, on his journey to Constantinople. Both were captured and imprisoned by the ruler of Epirus, Theodore Komnenos Doukas, and died in prison. He was succeeded by his son, Louis I.

== Sources ==
- Richard, Jean (1992). Lloyd, Simon (ed.). Saint Louis, Crusader King of France. Translated by Birrell, Jean. Cambridge University Press.
