= Ouges =

- Commune
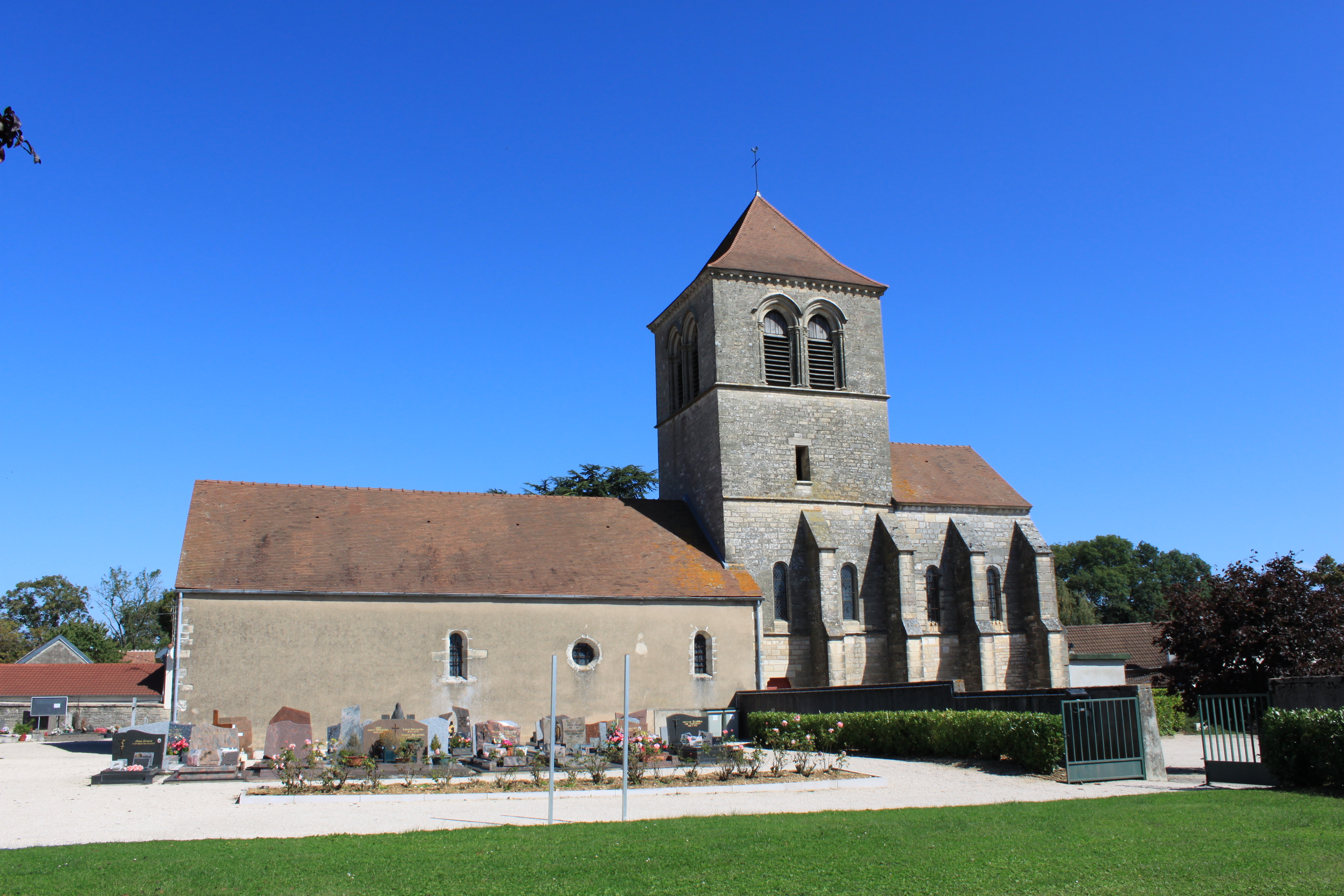
- The church in Ouges

- Coat of arms
- Location of Ouges
- Location within France Location within Bourgogne-Franche-Comté
- Coordinates: 47°15′44″N 5°04′34″E
- Country: France
- Region: Bourgogne-Franche-Comté
- Department: Côte-d'Or
- Arrondissement: Dijon
- Canton: Longvic
- Intercommunality: Dijon Métropole

Government
  - Mayor (2020–2026): Jean-Claude Girard
- Area^{1}: 12.1 km^{2} (4.7 sq mi)
- Highest elevation: 239 m (784 ft)
- Lowest elevation: 211 m (692 ft)
- Population (2023): 1,402
  - Density: 116/km^{2} (300/sq mi)
- Time zone: UTC+01:00 (CET)
  - Summer (DST): UTC+02:00 (CEST)
- INSEE/Postal code: 21473 /21600
- ^{1} French Land Register data, which excludes lakes, ponds, glaciers > 1 km^{2} (0.386 sq mi or 247 acres) and river estuaries.

Ouges (French pronunciation: [uʒ]) is a commune in the Côte-d'Or department in eastern France.

== Population ==
Historical population
| Year | Pop. | ±% p.a. |
|---|---|---|
| 1968 | 1,138 | — |
| 1975 | 1,028 | −1.44% |
| 1982 | 797 | −3.57% |
| 1990 | 965 | +2.42% |
| 1999 | 1,043 | +0.87% |
| 2007 | 1,192 | +1.68% |
| 2012 | 1,285 | +1.51% |
| 2017 | 1,523 | +3.46% |
| 2023 | 1,402 | −1.37% |
Source: INSEE

== See also ==
- Communes of the Côte-d'Or department
