= Foucherans, Jura =

Commune in Bourgogne-Franche-Comté, France

Foucherans
- Commune
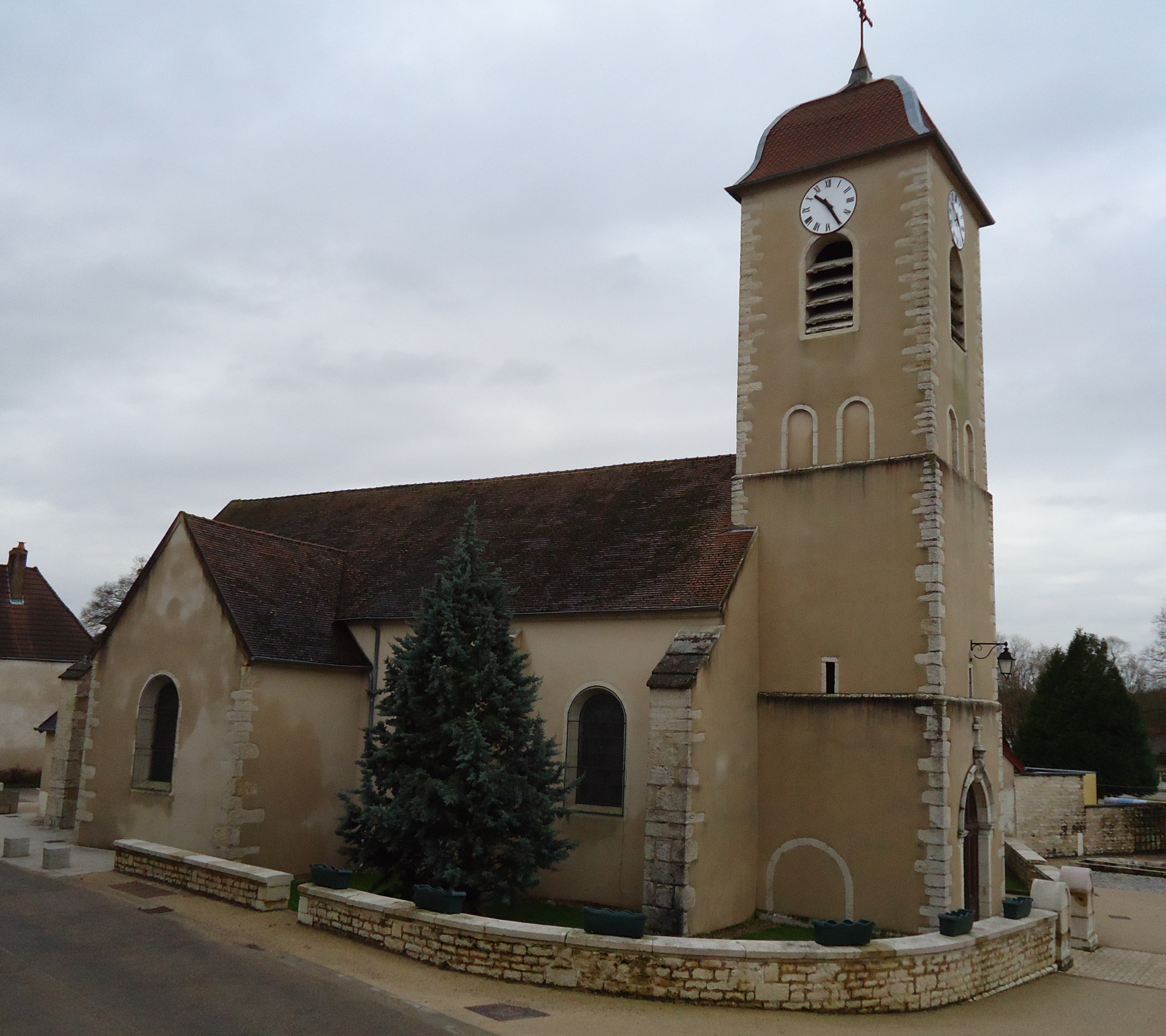
- The church in Foucherans

- Coat of arms
- Location of Foucherans
- Location within France Location within Bourgogne-Franche-Comté
- Coordinates: 47°04′58″N 5°27′14″E
- Country: France
- Region: Bourgogne-Franche-Comté
- Department: Jura
- Arrondissement: Dole
- Canton: Dole-1
- Intercommunality: CA Grand Dole

Government
  - Mayor (2020–2026): Christine Riotte
- Area^{1}: 7.70 km^{2} (2.97 sq mi)
- Highest elevation: 278 m (912 ft)
- Lowest elevation: 203 m (666 ft)
- Population (2023): 2,284
  - Density: 297/km^{2} (768/sq mi)
- Time zone: UTC+01:00 (CET)
  - Summer (DST): UTC+02:00 (CEST)
- INSEE/Postal code: 39233 /39100
- ^{1} French Land Register data, which excludes lakes, ponds, glaciers > 1 km^{2} (0.386 sq mi or 247 acres) and river estuaries.

Foucherans (French pronunciation: [fuʃʁɑ̃]) is a commune in the Jura department in Bourgogne-Franche-Comté in eastern France.

== Population ==
Historical population

| Year | Pop. | ±% p.a. |
|---|---|---|
| 1793 | 428 | — |
| 1800 | 519 | +2.79% |
| 1806 | 489 | −0.99% |
| 1821 | 443 | −0.66% |
| 1831 | 469 | +0.57% |
| 1836 | 510 | +1.69% |
| 1841 | 624 | +4.12% |
| 1846 | 654 | +0.94% |
| 1851 | 671 | +0.51% |
| 1856 | 613 | −1.79% |
| 1861 | 617 | +0.13% |
| 1866 | 641 | +0.77% |
| 1872 | 620 | −0.55% |
| 1876 | 584 | −1.48% |
| 1881 | 584 | +0.00% |
| 1886 | 609 | +0.84% |
| 1891 | 615 | +0.20% |
| 1896 | 676 | +1.91% |
| 1901 | 679 | +0.09% |

| Year | Pop. | ±% p.a. |
|---|---|---|
| 1906 | 713 | +0.98% |
| 1911 | 753 | +1.10% |
| 1921 | 723 | −0.41% |
| 1926 | 764 | +1.11% |
| 1931 | 729 | −0.93% |
| 1936 | 692 | −1.04% |
| 1946 | 952 | +3.24% |
| 1954 | 852 | −1.38% |
| 1962 | 1,000 | +2.02% |
| 1968 | 1,509 | +7.10% |
| 1975 | 1,413 | −0.93% |
| 1982 | 1,523 | +1.08% |
| 1990 | 1,710 | +1.46% |
| 1999 | 1,760 | +0.32% |
| 2007 | 1,665 | −0.69% |
| 2012 | 2,018 | +3.92% |
| 2017 | 2,193 | +1.68% |
| 2023 | 2,284 | +0.68% |

Source: EHESS and INSEE (1968–2023)

== See also ==
- Communes of the Jura department
