= Eudes de Sully =

Medieval Bishop of Paris

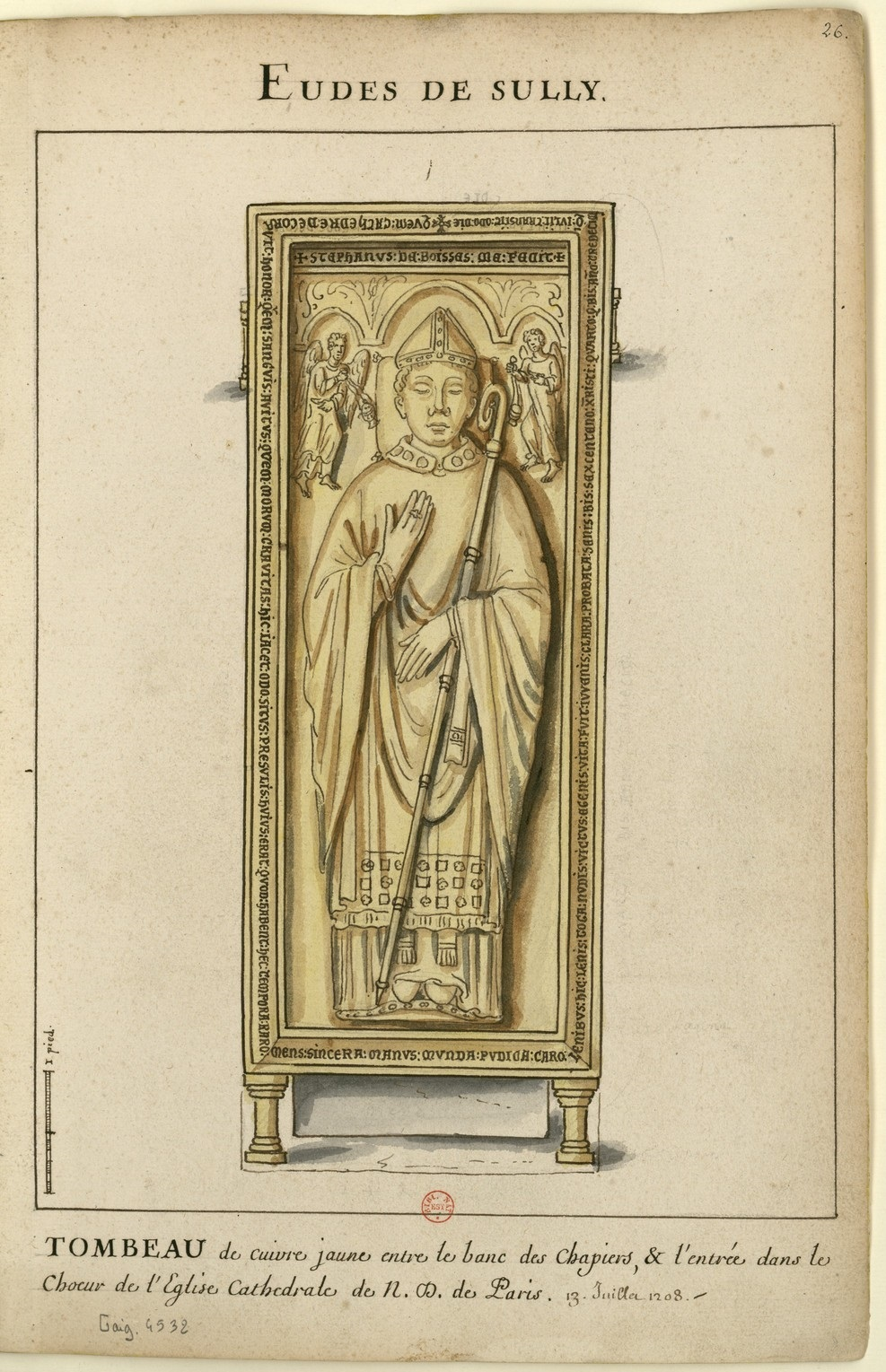
Lost Tomb of Eudes de Sully

Image of de Sully from a 14th century family tree

Eudes de Sully (French: Odon de Sully, Odo de Sully; Latin: Odo de Soliaco) (died 1208) was Bishop of Paris, from 1197 to 1208. He is considered to be the first to have put emphasis on the Elevation liturgy during the Catholic Mass. He worked to address many social matters including regulating celebrations in his cathedral. He also tried to ban chess. He founded the abbey that became Port-Royal.

== Family ==
Eudes de Sully was son of Eudes Archambaud of Sully and Matilda of Baugency. His brother Henry was archbishop of Bourges.

== Life ==
On the political stage, Eudes came into conflict with Philip II of France, over Philip's intended repudiation of his wife.

As a churchman, Eudes continued the building work on Notre Dame de Paris. Eudes is considered the first to have emphasized the elevation of the host during the Catholic Mass. In 1175, Eudes forbade communion for children.

Eudes attempted to regulate celebrations in his cathedral, Christmas and the Feast of Fools. He also tried to ban chess.

Eudes is also known for his promotion of polyphony in church, and the music of Pérotin.

Eudes was a founder of the abbey that became Port-Royal.

== Burial ==
Upon his death in 1208, de Sully was buried in an above-ground stone sarcophagus which was placed in the choir of Notre-Dame. The location of the tomb was unusually prominent, directly in the middle of the first double bay of the choir, or about eight meters behind the current high altar. The sarcophagus was covered with a copper slab which stood on four legs and featured a relief sculpture of the bishop and two angels by Étienne de Boisses. The tomb remained at this location for 491 years before it was removed during the renovations of Robert de Cotte. This first tomb was drawn by Roger de Gaignières before it disappeared.

De Sully, along with several others buried in Notre-Dame's choir, were reinterred on 6 June 1699 in a common grave in the apse. This grave measured about 1.65 meters by 0.66 meters and was placed in the floor.

== Sources ==
Eudes' synodal decrees appear in volume 22 of Giovanni Domenico Mansi's Sacrorum conciliorum nova et amplissima collectio , 53 vols., Graz : Akademische Druck- u. Verlangsanstalt, 1961. More recently Odette Pontal produced a critical edition of these statutes in Les statuts synodaux Français du XIII^{e} siècle. Tome 1: Les Statuts de Paris et le synodal de l'ouest. Paris: Bibliothèque Nationale, 1971.

- Cheney, C. R., English Synodalia, London, Oxford University Press, 1968, discussing the impact of these statutes in England.
