= Flagey, Doubs =

Flagey
- Commune
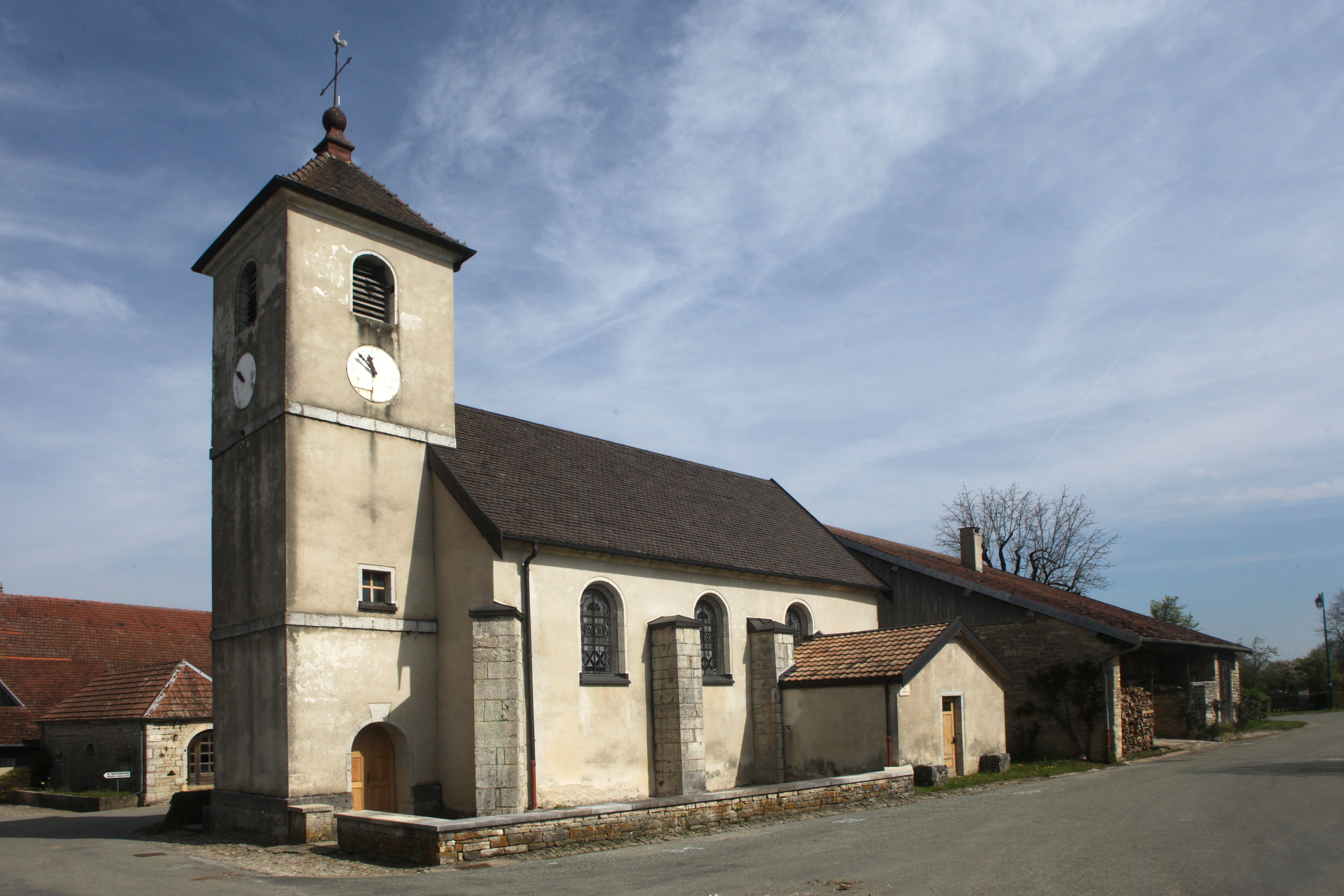
- The church in Flagey
- Location of Flagey
- Location within France Location within Bourgogne-Franche-Comté
- Coordinates: 47°02′18″N 6°07′27″E
- Country: France
- Region: Bourgogne-Franche-Comté
- Department: Doubs
- Arrondissement: Besançon
- Canton: Ornans
- Intercommunality: Loue-Lison

Government
  - Mayor (2020–2026): Pierre Maire
- Area^{1}: 7.79 km^{2} (3.01 sq mi)
- Highest elevation: 631 m (2,070 ft)
- Lowest elevation: 440 m (1,440 ft)
- Population (2023): 129
  - Density: 16.6/km^{2} (42.9/sq mi)
- Time zone: UTC+01:00 (CET)
  - Summer (DST): UTC+02:00 (CEST)
- INSEE/Postal code: 25241 /25330
- ^{1} French Land Register data, which excludes lakes, ponds, glaciers > 1 km^{2} (0.386 sq mi or 247 acres) and river estuaries.

Flagey (French pronunciation: [flaʒɛ]) is a commune in the Doubs department in the Bourgogne-Franche-Comté region in eastern France.

== Population ==
Historical population
Year	Pop.	±% p.a.
1968	116	—
1975	99	−2.24%
1982	101	+0.29%
1990	110	+1.07%
1999	102	−0.84%
2007	134	+3.47%
2012	142	+1.17%
2017	161	+2.54%
2023	129	−3.63%
Source: INSEE

== See also ==
- Communes of the Doubs department
