= Monnières, Jura =

Commune in Bourgogne-Franche-Comté, France

Monnières
- Commune
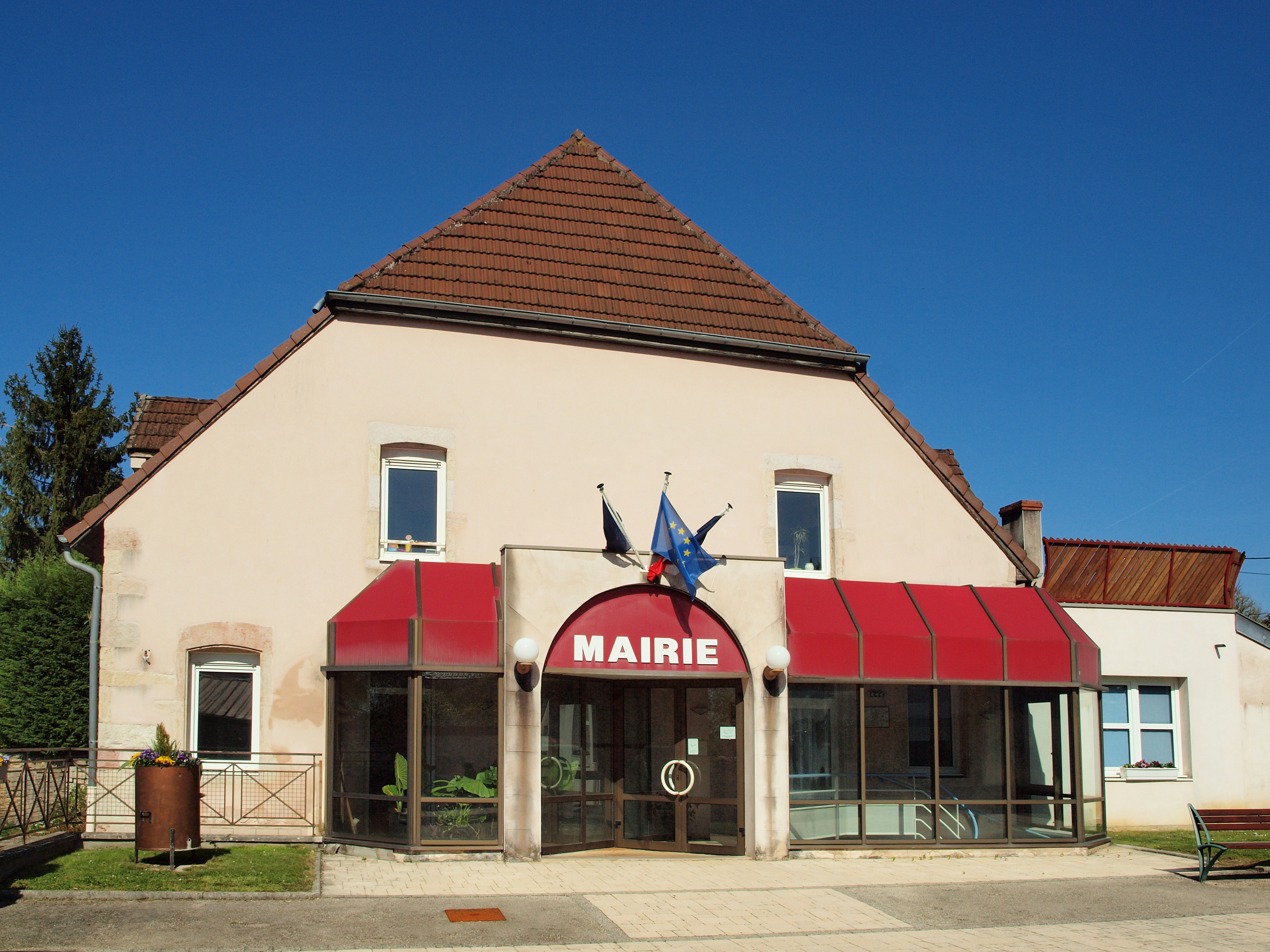
- Town hall

- Coat of arms
- Location of Monnières
- Location within France Location within Bourgogne-Franche-Comté
- Coordinates: 47°06′46″N 5°27′46″E
- Country: France
- Region: Bourgogne-Franche-Comté
- Department: Jura
- Arrondissement: Dole
- Canton: Dole-1
- Intercommunality: CA Grand Dole

Government
  - Mayor (2020–2026): Patrick Viverge
- Area^{1}: 2.06 km^{2} (0.80 sq mi)
- Highest elevation: 341 m (1,119 ft)
- Lowest elevation: 220 m (720 ft)
- Population (2023): 387
  - Density: 188/km^{2} (487/sq mi)
- Time zone: UTC+01:00 (CET)
  - Summer (DST): UTC+02:00 (CEST)
- INSEE/Postal code: 39345 /39100
- ^{1} French Land Register data, which excludes lakes, ponds, glaciers > 1 km^{2} (0.386 sq mi or 247 acres) and river estuaries.

Monnières (French pronunciation: [mɔnjɛʁ]) is a commune in the Jura department in Bourgogne-Franche-Comté in eastern France.

== See also ==
- Communes of the Jura department
