= Chevigny =

Commune in Bourgogne-Franche-Comté, France

- Commune
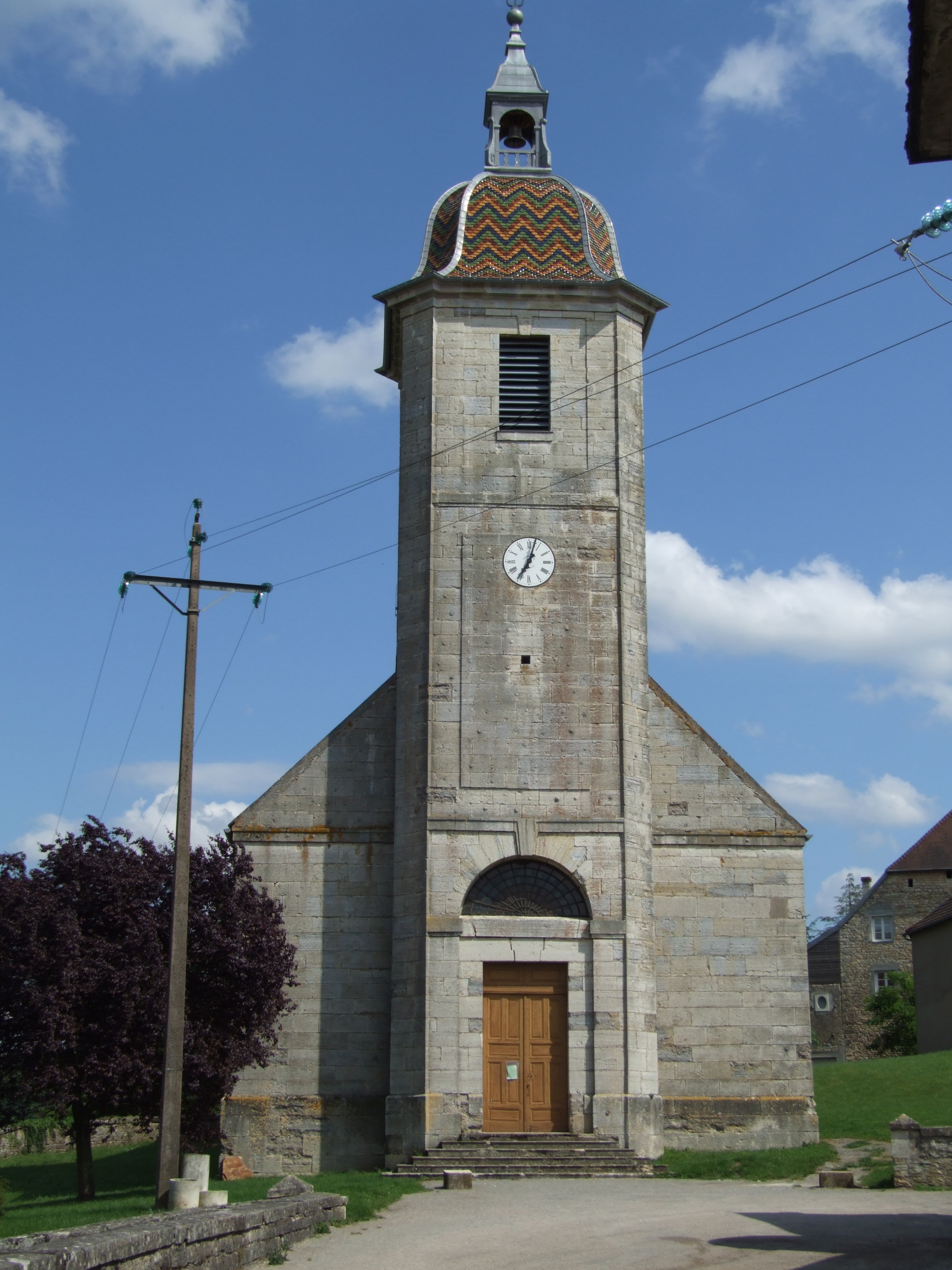
- The church in Chevigny
- Location of Chevigny
- Location within France Location within Bourgogne-Franche-Comté
- Coordinates: 47°10′39″N 5°28′34″E
- Country: France
- Region: Bourgogne-Franche-Comté
- Department: Jura
- Arrondissement: Dole
- Canton: Authume
- Intercommunality: CA Grand Dole

Government
  - Mayor (2020–2026): Jean Luc Bonin
- Area^{1}: 7.67 km^{2} (2.96 sq mi)
- Highest elevation: 295 m (968 ft)
- Lowest elevation: 192 m (630 ft)
- Population (2023): 255
  - Density: 33.2/km^{2} (86.1/sq mi)
- Time zone: UTC+01:00 (CET)
  - Summer (DST): UTC+02:00 (CEST)
- INSEE/Postal code: 39141 /39290
- ^{1} French Land Register data, which excludes lakes, ponds, glaciers > 1 km^{2} (0.386 sq mi or 247 acres) and river estuaries.

Chevigny (French pronunciation: [ʃəviɲi]) is a commune in the Jura department in Bourgogne-Franche-Comté in eastern France.

== Population ==
Historical population
Year	Pop.	±% p.a.
1968	173	—
1975	190	+1.35%
1982	192	+0.15%
1990	198	+0.39%
1999	214	+0.87%
2007	272	+3.04%
2012	284	+0.87%
2017	280	−0.28%
2023	255	−1.55%
Source: INSEE

== See also ==
- Communes of the Jura department
