= Henri IV de Sully =

French noble

Arms of the Lords of Sully: Azure, a semé of mullets and a lion rampant or.

Henri IV de Sully (died 1336), Grand Butler of France, Treasurer of France, Lord of Sully was a 13th-14th century French noble.

== Biography ==
Henri IV de Sully was the eldest son of Henri III de Sully and Marguerite de Bommiers.

Sully was an adviser to King Philip IV of France at the end of his reign, and tutored Phillip's younger son Count Philip de Poitiers. In 1316, Sully supported the latter at his accession to the regency and the throne of France as King Philip V of France, and was rewarded by receiving the prestigious office of Grand Butler of France in 1317.

Sully played a key role in the administration of the kingdom by becoming Treasurer of France. He also played a key diplomatic role, participating in the reconciliation between Philip V and his cousin Robert III of Artois. In 1318, Sully was sent as an embassy to Pope John XXII. The same year, Sully was involved in a major dispute with Beraud de Mercœur, a royal adviser, whom Sully accused of treason. The king had to intervene to settle the quarrel between the two men.

Philip V died on 3 January 1322. His brother Charles succeeded him as King Charles IV and replaced Sully as head of the Treasury with Pierre de Rémi. In October 1322, Sully was captured by the Scots at the Battle of Old Byland. Sully however was honoured as a guest by King Robert the Bruce who required no ransom and Sully helped to negotiate a truce between the Scots and English the following year. He was sent as an ambassador to Westminster by Charles IV, to arrange the marriage of his daughter with the eldest son of the King Edward II of England. Sully appears to have found favour with Edward II and was appointed Seneschal of Gascony in 1325–26. In 1329, Sully was appointed by Philip III of Navarre as governor of the Kingdom of Navarre. During this appointment, Sully undertook diplomatic negotiations aiming to launch a crusade against the Kingdom of Granada, but the crusade did not eventuate. In 1335, Navarre declared war against the Crown of Aragon, with Sully taking charge of the defence of the small Pyrenean kingdom. He died in 1336 and was succeeded by his son Jean.

=== Marriage and issue ===
Henri IV married Jeanne, daughter of Jean V de Vendôme and Éléonore de Montfort, and had the following known issue:

- Jean II de Sully (died 1343) married Marguerite de Bourbon
- Philippe de Sully married Jeanne de Harcourt
- Marie de Sully married Robert VIII Bertrand de Bricquebec, Marshall of France
- Mahaut de Sully married Jean II de Levis, Lord of Mirepoix
- Éléonore de Sully married Gaston I de Levis-Mirepoix
- Marguerite de Sully married Geoffroy IV de Aspremont
- Agnès de Sully married to Thomas de La Bruyére
- Jeanne de Sully, nun in Longchamp
- Isabelle de Sully, nun in Longchamp
