= Fénay =

- Commune
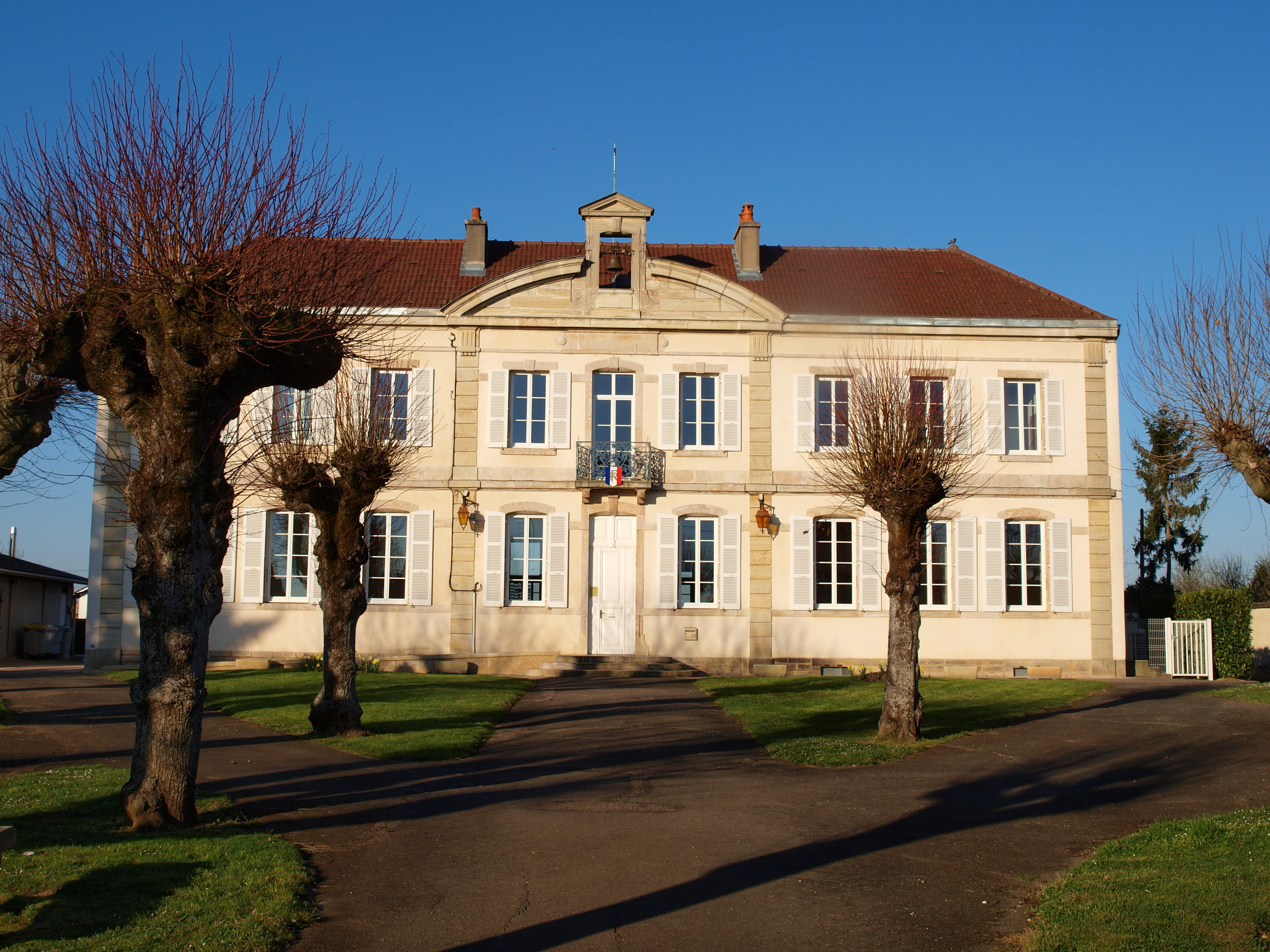
- Town hall

- Coat of arms
- Location of Fénay
- Location within France Location within Bourgogne-Franche-Comté
- Coordinates: 47°14′37″N 5°03′36″E
- Country: France
- Region: Bourgogne-Franche-Comté
- Department: Côte-d'Or
- Arrondissement: Dijon
- Canton: Longvic
- Intercommunality: Dijon Métropole

Government
  - Mayor (2020–2026): Laurent Gobet
- Area^{1}: 10.46 km^{2} (4.04 sq mi)
- Highest elevation: 243 m (797 ft)
- Lowest elevation: 210 m (690 ft)
- Population (2023): 1,708
  - Density: 163.3/km^{2} (422.9/sq mi)
- Time zone: UTC+01:00 (CET)
  - Summer (DST): UTC+02:00 (CEST)
- INSEE/Postal code: 21263 /21600
- ^{1} French Land Register data, which excludes lakes, ponds, glaciers > 1 km^{2} (0.386 sq mi or 247 acres) and river estuaries.

Fénay (French pronunciation: [fenɛ]) is a commune in the Côte-d'Or department in eastern France.

== Population ==
Historical population
Year	Pop.	±% p.a.
1968	414	—
1975	1,068	+14.50%
1982	1,226	+1.99%
1990	1,346	+1.17%
1999	1,340	−0.05%
2007	1,340	+0.00%
2012	1,565	+3.15%
2017	1,616	+0.64%
2023	1,708	+0.93%
Source: INSEE

== See also ==
- Communes of the Côte-d'Or department
