= Henry of Sully (died 1189) =

Abbot of Fécamp

Henry de Sully
- Abbot of Fécamp
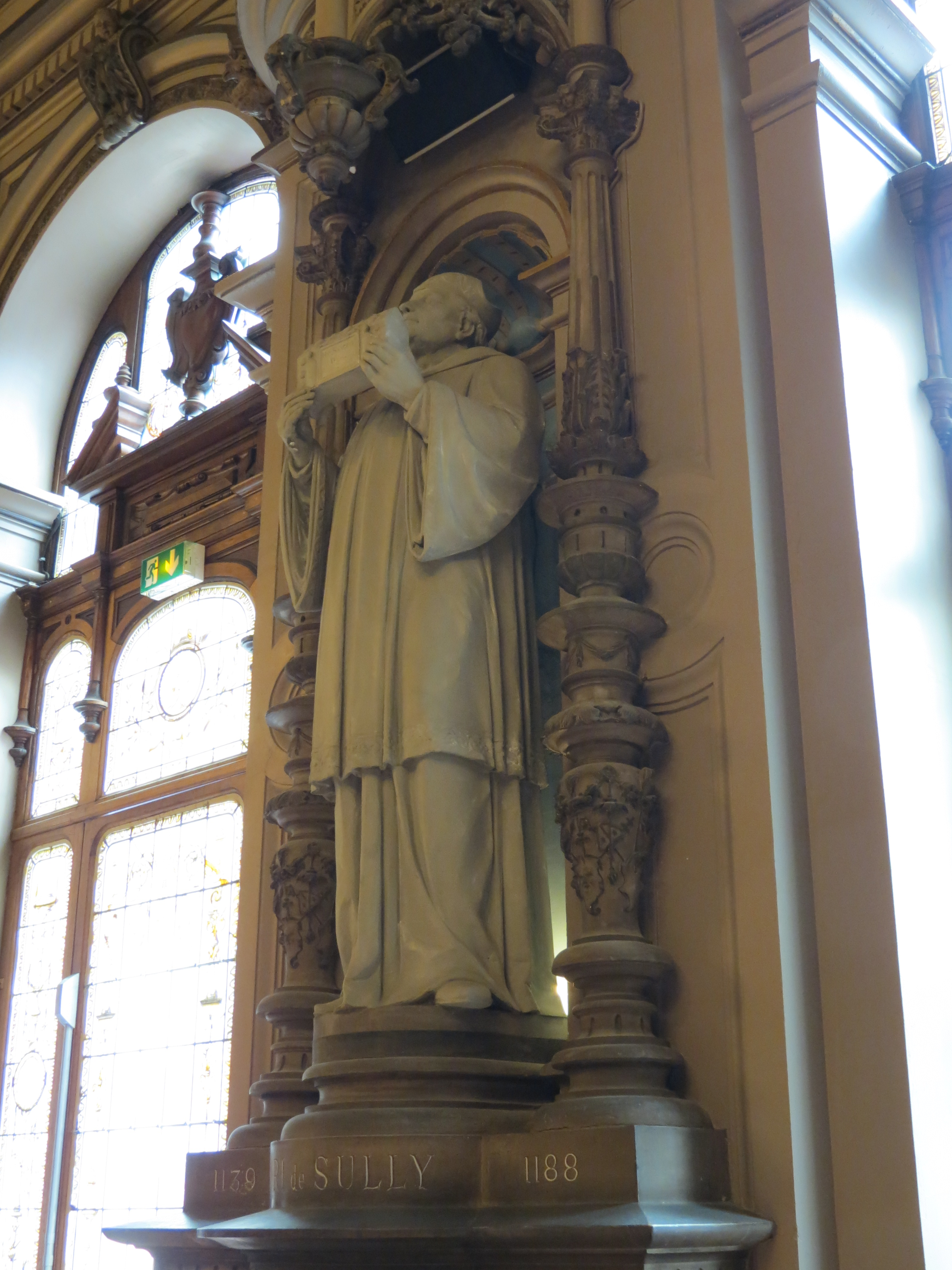
- Other posts: Bishop-elect of Salisbury and Archbishop-elect of York

Personal details
- Died: 1189 Fécamp, Normandy
- Parents: William, Count of Sully; Agnes of Sully

Henry de Sully (died 1189) was Abbot of Fécamp and Bishop-designate of Salisbury and Archbishop-elect of York.

== Life ==
Henry was son of William, Count of Sully, the eldest brother of Stephen, King of England and Henry of Blois, Bishop of Winchester. Henry's mother was William's wife, Agnes of Sully, who had been attached to the household of Adela of Blois, William's mother. Although William was the eldest son of Adela and her husband Stephen, Count of Blois, he was passed over for the comital title and his younger brother Theobald became Count of Champagne on their father's death.

Henry became a Cluniac monk, and was nominated in March 1140 by Henry of Blois to be Bishop of Salisbury, but the nomination was quashed. As compensation, Henry of Blois then named Henry de Sully the abbot of Fécamp Abbey in Normandy. Later in 1140, after his grandmother's death, Henry was nominated to become Archbishop of York, but his election was again quashed this time by Pope Innocent II because Henry wished to hold both the abbacy of Fécamp along with the archbishopric. Henry died at Fécamp in 1189.

== Seal ==
The seal of Henry de Sully, is oval, 70 mm, depicting a seated abbot seen from the front, holding his crosier in his right and left hands. It shows an open book, SIGILLUM ABBATIS SANCTE TRINITATIS FICANNI, (A 8704)

== Citations ==
Catholic Church titles
Preceded by Roger of Salisbury	Bishop-designate of Salisbury; 1140 (nomination rejected)	Succeeded by Philip de Harcourt
Preceded by ?	Abbot of Fécamp; 1140–1189	Succeeded by ?
Preceded by Waltheof	Archbishop-elect of York; 1140 (election quashed)	Succeeded by William of York
