= Sully-sur-Loire =

- Commune
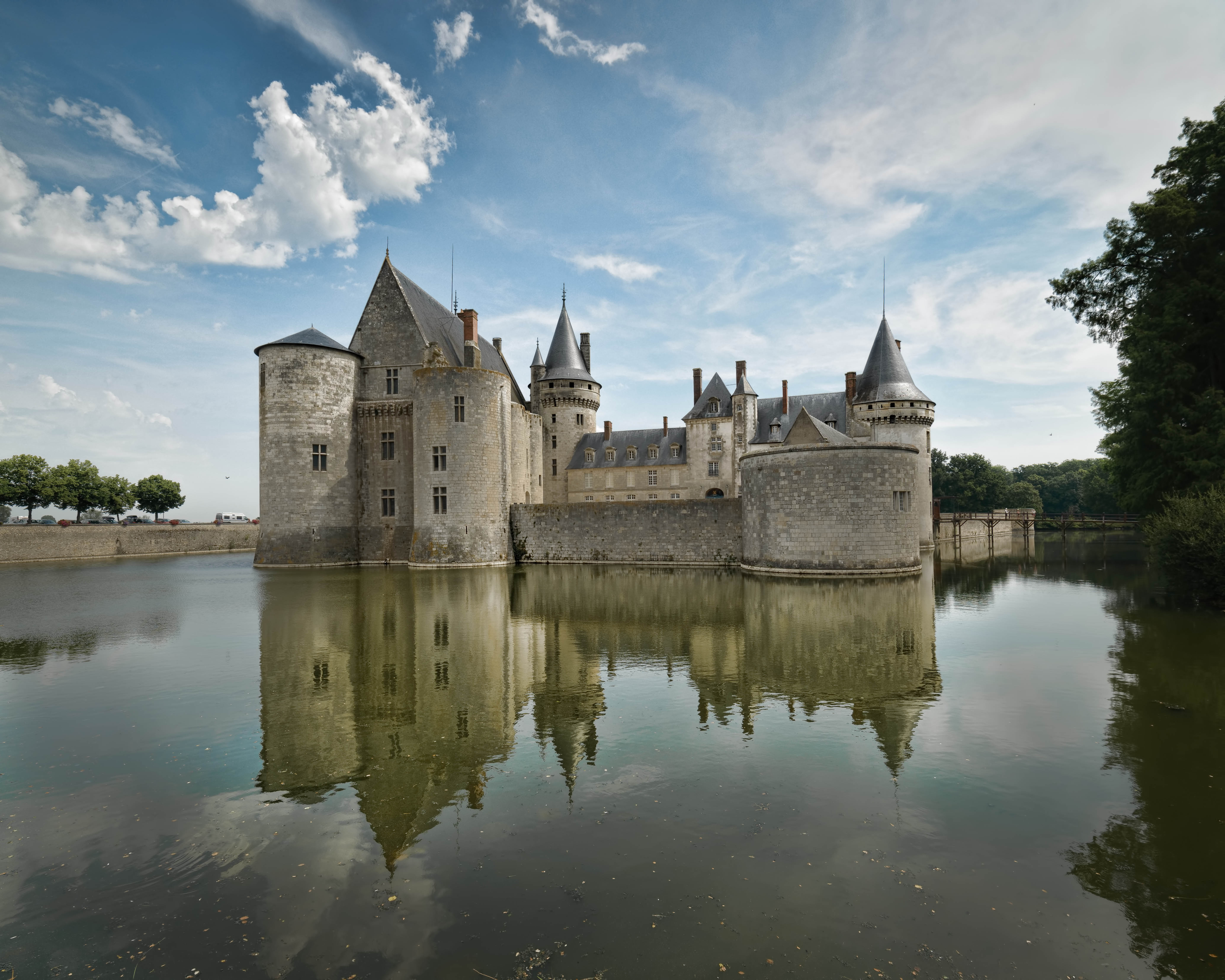
- Château of Sully-sur-Loire

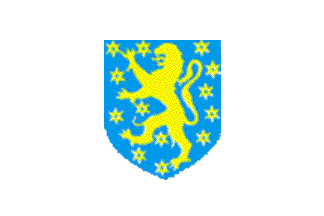
- Flag Coat of arms
- Location of Sully-sur-Loire
- Location within France Location within Centre-Val de Loire
- Coordinates: 47°45′57″N 2°22′34″E
- Country: France
- Region: Centre-Val de Loire
- Department: Loiret
- Arrondissement: Orléans
- Canton: Sully-sur-Loire

Government
  - Mayor (2020–2026): Jean-Luc Riglet (UDI)
- Area^{1}: 43.6 km^{2} (16.8 sq mi)
- Elevation: 119 m (390 ft)
- Highest elevation: 151 m (495 ft)
- Lowest elevation: 107 m (351 ft)
- Population (2023): 5,124
  - Density: 118/km^{2} (304/sq mi)
- Time zone: UTC+01:00 (CET)
  - Summer (DST): UTC+02:00 (CEST)
- INSEE/Postal code: 45315 /45600
- ^{1} French Land Register data, which excludes lakes, ponds, glaciers > 1 km^{2} (0.386 sq mi or 247 acres) and river estuaries.

Sully-sur-Loire (French pronunciation: [syli syʁ lwaʁ], literally Sully on Loire) is a commune in the Loiret department, north-central France. It is the seat of the canton of Sully-sur-Loire. It lies on the left bank of the river Loire.

== Population ==
Historical population
| Year | Pop. | ±% p.a. |
|---|---|---|
| 1968 | 4,278 | — |
| 1975 | 5,049 | +2.40% |
| 1982 | 5,825 | +2.06% |
| 1990 | 5,806 | −0.04% |
| 1999 | 5,907 | +0.19% |
| 2007 | 5,781 | −0.27% |
| 2012 | 5,444 | −1.19% |
| 2017 | 5,348 | −0.36% |
| 2023 | 5,124 | −0.71% |
Source: INSEE

== Castles ==
The château of Sully-sur-Loire dates from the end of the 14th century and is a prime example of a medieval fortress. It was built at a strategic crossing of the Loire river. The château was expanded by Maximilien de Béthune, first duke of Sully and prime minister of King Henry IV of France (1560–1641), who is buried on the grounds of his château. The family of the dukes of Sully retained ownership of the château until the 20th century.

King Louis XIV, his mother Queen Anne of Austria, and prime minister Cardinal Mazarin sought refuge in the château of Sully-sur-Loire in March 1652 after they were driven out of Paris during the revolt of the French nobility known as the Fronde.

== Notable people ==
- Maurice de Sully (1105/1120 - 1196), born in Sully-sur-Loire, bishop of Paris from 1160 to 1196
- Pope Gregory XI (1329/1331 - 1378), was the archdeacon of Sully (as Pierre Roger de Beaufort) before becoming the last French pope in Avignon
- Georges de La Trémoille (1382-1446), count of Guînes, died on May 6, 1446 in the castle of Sully-sur-Loire

== See also ==
- Communes of the Loiret department
