= County of Champagne =

Medieval feudal state in northeastern France

Coordinates: 48.2956°N 4.0716°E

County of Champagne: Comitatus Campaniensis (Latin); Conté de Champaigne (Old French)
- 12th century–14th century
- Coat of arms

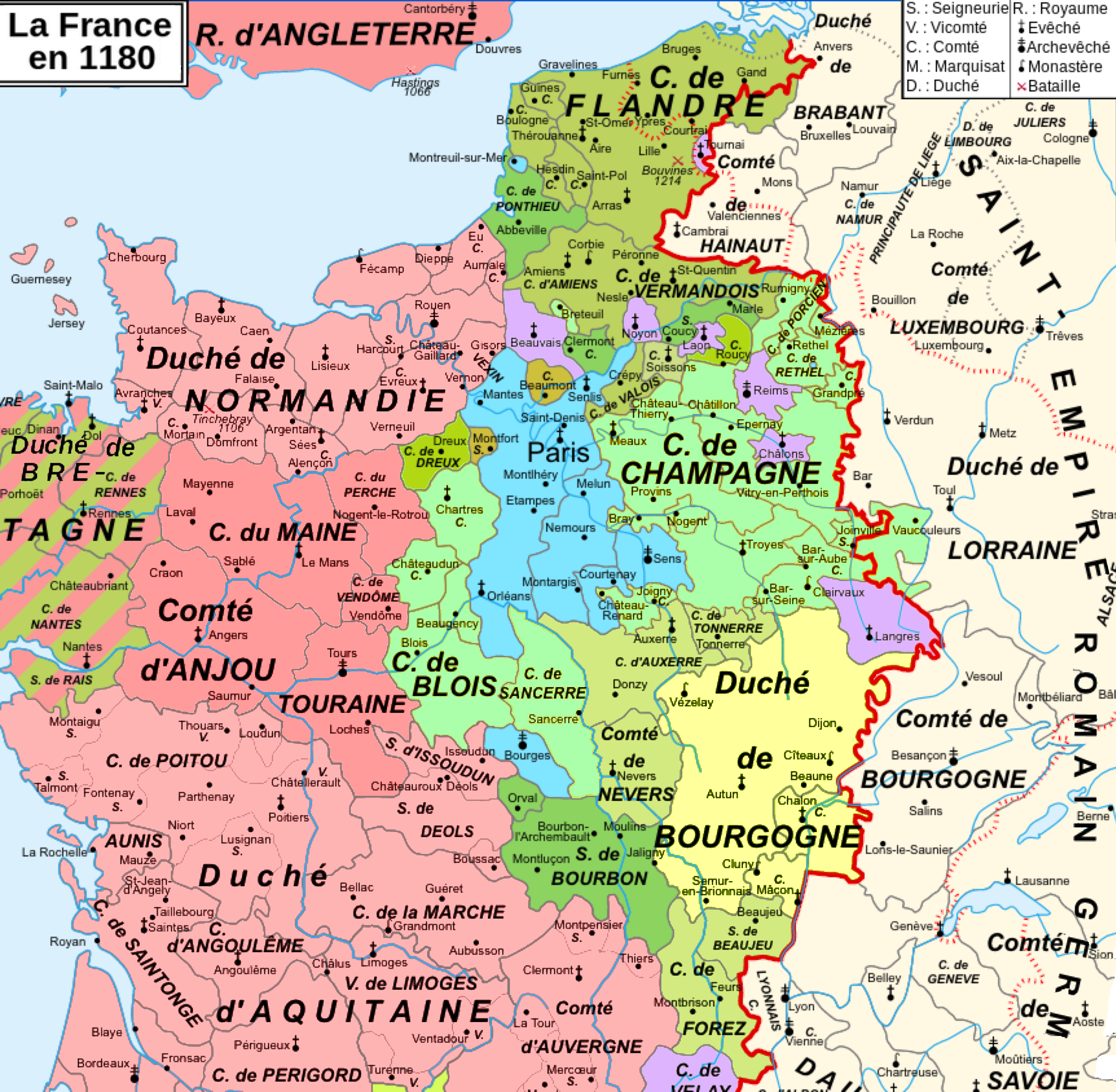
- County of Champagne (green) within the Kingdom of France in 1180
- Status: Vassal state within the Kingdom of France
- Capital: Troyes
- Religion: Roman Catholicism
- Government: Feudal county
- Count
  - 1102–1125: Hugh of Troyes
  - 1305–1314: Louis I of Navarre
- Historical era: High Middle Ages
  - Established: 12th century
  - County merged with the French Crown: 14th century
| Preceded by | Succeeded by |
| County of Troyes; County of Meaux | 1066 & 1125: County of Blois; 1305: Kingdom of France |
- Today part of: France

The County of Champagne (Latin: Comitatus Campaniensis; Old French: Conté de Champaigne) was a medieval territory and feudal principality in the Kingdom of France. It developed on the rich plains between Paris and the border of the Holy Roman Empire in the 12th century. It became an economic hub of northern France and an international trade center in part due to the trade fairs instituted by Count Theobald II, and steady land clearing led to economic and urban growth. Count Henry the Liberal established the city of Troyes as the county's capital and expanded the state. The court of Champagne under Count Henry and Countess Marie saw a proliferation of literary authors. In the 13th century, Count Theobald III, Countess Blanche, and Count Theobald IV oversaw a centralization of the state. The county is noted for its support to the crusades and monastic foundations, especially those of the Cistercians, which originated within its borders. From 1234 the count of Champagne was also the king of Navarre, and the marriage of Queen Joan I of Navarre with King Philip IV of France led to the county being absorbed into the royal domain of the kings of France in the 14th century.

== Development ==
The name of the county, Champagne, comes from the vast open lands (campi) between the rivers Aisne, Meuse, and Yonne east of the city of Paris. This area of the medieval Kingdom of France was a highly fragmented frontier zone between the domain of the king of France and the Holy Roman Empire. The long process of consolidation of the county began in 1021 when Count Odo II of Blois (r. 996–1037) inherited the counties of Meaux and Troyes along with a number of lesser lordships. Count Theobald III of Blois divided his possessions between his sons. By 1100 the youngest, Hugh, inherited Troyes from his father and Bar-sur-Aube and Vitry from his mother, Adele of Valois; these three counties formed the core of the County of Champagne. Hugh called himself variously count of Troyes and count of Champagne.

The lands of southern Champagne and Brie coalesced under Count Theobald II (r. 1120–1152). Theobald encouraged the immigration of settlers and merchants, leading to the development of the sparsely populated countryside and the growth of towns. Theobald did homage for Troyes to Duke Odo II of Burgundy; for Blois and Meaux he may have done homage to King Louis VII of France; and for smaller holdings to the archbishop of Reims and the bishop of Langres. Nevertheless, Champagne remained a collection of lordships rather than a single entity during Theobald's rule and only gained a fixed capital, accounts administration, a chancery, and a dynastic necropolis later in the 12th century.

The first count born in Champagne was Henry the Liberal (r. 1152–1181), during whose rule the county emerged as a distinct political entity. Henry's greatest achievement was the creation of a territorial state from the various lands in Champagne. He built a palace in Troyes to serve as the administrative center of the new state, created a chancery, and established an accounts administration. Henry expanded the county to include borderland castles, including nine castles on the border of the Holy Roman Empire, becoming a vassal of the emperor as well. He further expanded northwards by agreement with his brother Archbishop William White Hands of Reims, while the southern border shifted when several lords transferred their primary allegiance from the bishops of Auxerre and Langres to the count of Champagne. Countess Marie continued Henry's policy. By the time of Marie's death in 1198, Champagne had become a cohesive territorial state.

Count Theobald III (r. 1198–1201), Countess Blanche (r. 1201–1222), and Count Theobald IV (r. 1222–1253) created a fairly centralized state by making the largely autonomous vassals accountable to an efficient bureaucracy and aggressively expanded the comital domain. The 13th century saw the counts more tightly control the circulation of fiefs, which passed through inheritance, grant, mortgage, sale, benefaction, and allodial conversion, and the fiefs simultaneously became open to women and non-knighted men. The War of the Succession of Champagne devastated the southeastern part of the county in 1218.

== Administration ==
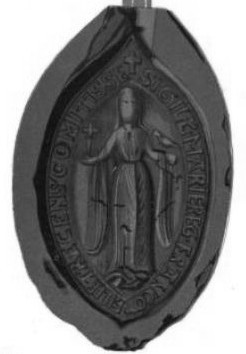
Seal of Countess Marie

The organization of the county was based on castellanies, which became the principal administrative unit under Henry the Liberal. There were about 30 castellanies in Champagne. Each castellany was centered on a castle or a castle town and encompassed lands of the count's domain as well as those of his vassals. At its head was the viscount or castellan, who had charge over the knights who guarded the castle and the roads travelled by merchants.

The count's villages were represented by mayors, who answered to the castellany's provost. The provost held courts and collected rents, tailles, and taxes from the comital domain. The castellanies themselves were administered by the comital officials in Troyes. The count's sergeants within collected information about the fiefs and obligations of the count's fiefholders within each castellany. In the 13th century, castellanies were grouped into bailliages, which were supervised by a bailli.

== Economy ==
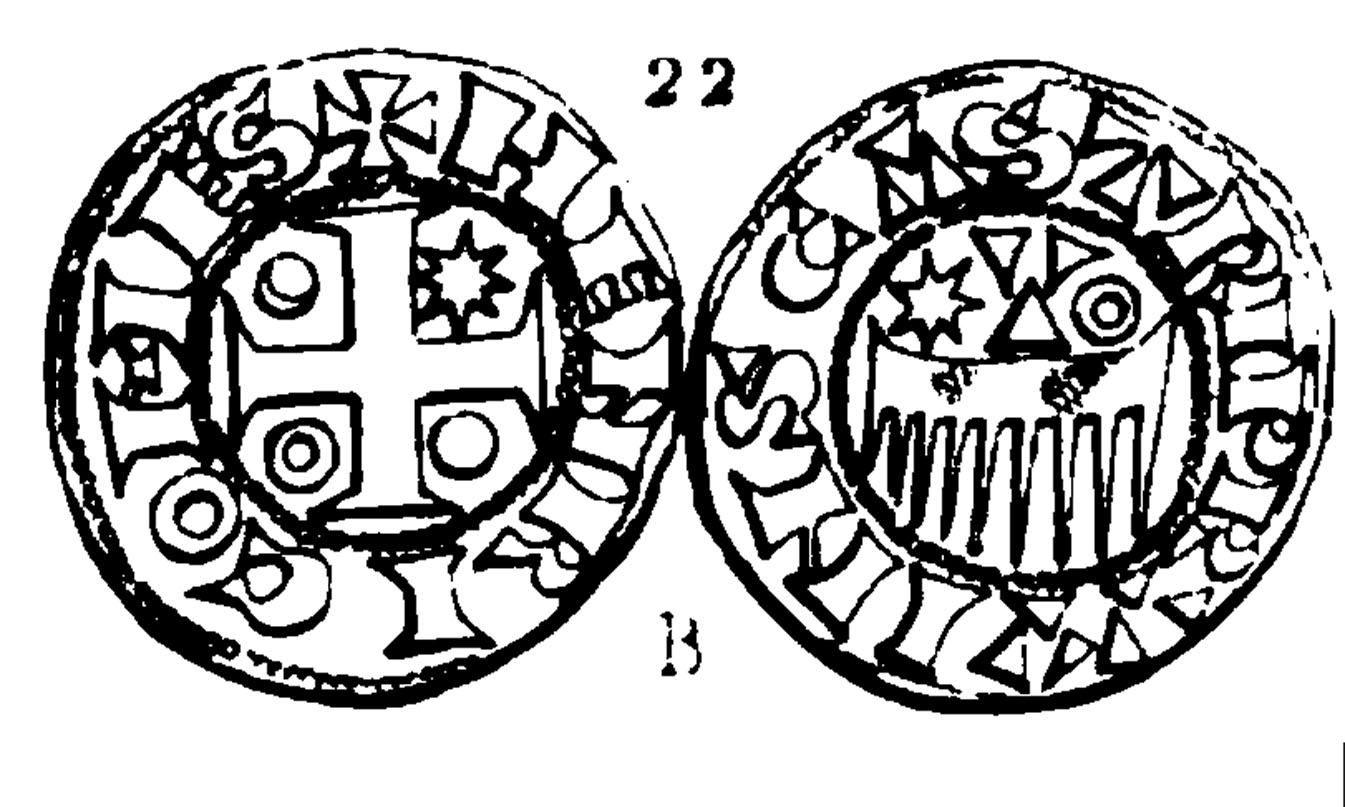
Reproduction of a coin of Count Henry

The economy of the county steadily expanded through persistent land clearing and urban growth. The Champagne trade fairs, initiated under Theobald II and protected and regulated by the subsequent counts, made the county the center of international trade and finance through most of the 1100s and 1200s. They principally attracted merchants and travelers from the neighboring County of Flanders and the Rhine Valley as well as from the states of Italy and England, but they also came from as far as the Mediterranean and the Baltic.

== Culture ==
=== Art ===
The intellectual and literary interests of Count Henry and Countess Marie transformed the county's capital, Troyes, into a cultural center as well. Numerous authors were active in the county and appeared at the court. Nicholas of Clairvaux, who was associated with the county's Clairvaux Abbey and the bishopric of Troyes, dedicated two collections of his literary works to Count Henry. Peter of Celle, who came from a Champenois noble family, is described by historian John F. Benton as "one of the finest spiritual writers of the twelfth century".

The most scholarly person at Henry's court, according to Benton, was Stephen of Alinerre, but his works have not survived. Further authors, such as Chrétien de Troyes, Evrat, Gace Brulé, Gautier d'Arras, and Simon Chèvre d'Or acknowledged the influence of the count and countess of Champagne. Guy of Bazoches (a scion of a Champenois noble family whom Benton describes as "one of the foremost Latin authors of Champagne"), John of Salisbury, Herbert of Bosham, and Philip of Harveng, addressed letters to the count. Walter Map, Petrus Riga, Guiot of Provins, Hugh III of Oisy (one of the great lords in the county), and Conon of Béthune are among the authors who wrote about the court of Champagne.

=== Religion ===
The County of Champagne was strongly committed to the crusades, taking part in every crusading campaign launched between 1095 and 1270. The counts, barons, and knights of Champagne contributed heavily to the efforts in the Latin East and the Peloponnese, the latter of which was settled by the Champenois noblemen.

The County of Champagne, especially its southern half, was the place of origin of the earliest Cistercian monasteries, and a tradition of patronage for the Cistercians developed early in the county's history.

== Subsumption ==
In 1234 Theobald IV became king of Navarre and henceforth the count-king spent little time in Champagne. Theobald V (r. 1256–1270) seldom intervened directly, leaving everyday affairs of state to his bureaucrats. Henry III (r. 1271–1274) likewise had little impact except for somewhat expanding the comital domain.

Henry III's death left the counties of Champagne and Brie and the Kingdom of Navarre in the hands of his minor daughter, Joan I. Her mother, Blanche of Artois, betrothed her to a son of King Philip III of France. Already at this point the chancery of Champagne began preparations for direct royal rule. Philip III decided that Joan should marry his eldest surviving son, the future Philip IV. While the comital government continued to function and Philip III respected the county's customs and the prerogatives of its High Court, but the gradual loss of autonomy began. The county began to be ruled from Paris. The historian Joseph Strayer argues that Philip desired Joan for his heir not because of her kingdom but because of her counties, which were more strategically important and far wealthier than Navarre. The acquisition of the County of Champagne was thus, in the opinion of the historian Elena Woodacre, "a huge achievement" for the kings of France.

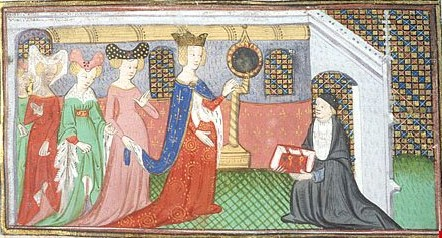
Durand of Champagne presenting a book to Queen Joan

Joan married the king's son in 1284. In 1285 he informed the bishop of Langres and the archbishops of Reims and Sens that the homage which the count of Champagne owed them would lapse upon his accession to the royal throne, and the same year he succeeded his father as king. Neither he nor Joan felt any particular attachment to Champagne, but Joan was far more personally involved with ruling Champagne than with ruling her kingdom, which she is not known to have visited. Philip ruled Champagne with a heavy hand, and the nobles of Champagne formed a league against him in 1314, but soon stood down.

King Louis X of France, successor of Joan I and Philip IV, died in 1316 leaving only a daughter, Joan II, and a pregnant widow, Clementia of Hungary. The royal family decided that, if Clementia gave birth to a son, he would inherit all of Louis's titles; but if she gave birth to a daughter, she and Joan would divide Navarre, Champagne, and Brie between them. A son, John I, was born, but died within days. Louis's brother Philip V assumed the kingdoms and the counties, prompting the noblemen of Champagne and Brie to protest until he promised that Joan would inherit Champagne and Brie if he were to leave no sons. By 1328 both Philip V and Charles IV, the final sons of Joan I and Philip IV, had died without leaving a son, and the throne of France was claimed by a cousin, Philip VI. Philip VI had no claim to either Navarre or Champagne and Brie, but was determined to keep the counties because of their strategic and economic importance. He ceded to Joan and her husband, Philip of Évreux, the counties of Longueville, Mortain, and Angoulême in return for Joan's right to Champagne and Brie. Champagne became fully integrated into the crown lands of France in 1361.

== See also ==
- Champagne (province)

== Sources ==
- Benton, John F. (1961). "The Court of Champagne as a Literary Center" (PDF). Speculum. 36 (4): 551–591. doi:10.2307/2856785. ISSN 0038-7134. JSTOR 2856785.
- Evergates, Theodore (2007). The Aristocracy in the County of Champagne, 1100-1300. University of Pennsylvania Press. ISBN 978-0812201888.
- Lester, Anne E. (27 June 2013). ""A Shared Imitation: Cistercian Convents and Crusader Families in Thirteenth-Century Champagne," Journal of Medieval History 35.4 (2009): 353-370". Academia.edu.
- Marshall, John (2026). Edmund, 1st Earl of Lancaster. Barsnley: Pen and Sword Books. ISBN 978-1-03614-368-8.
- Woodacre, Elena (2013). The Queens Regnant of Navarre: Succession, Politics, and Partnership, 1274-1512. Palgrave Macmillan. ISBN 978-1-137-33914-0.
