= Marie of France, Countess of Champagne =

Countess consort of Champagne (1145-1198)

Marie of France
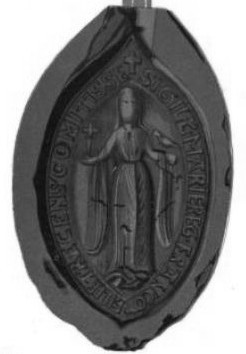
- Seal of Marie of France

Countess consort of Champagne
- Tenure: 1164 – 17 March 1181
- Born: 1145; Kingdom of France
- Died: 11 March 1198 (aged 52–53); County of Champagne
- Burial: Meaux Cathedral, Seine-et-Marne
- Spouse: Henry I, Count of Champagne (m. 1159; died 1181)
- Issue: Henry II, Count of Champagne; Marie, Latin Empress; Theobald III, Count of Champagne; Scholastique, Countess of Mâcon
- House: Capet
- Father: Louis VII of France
- Mother: Eleanor of Aquitaine

Marie of France (1145 – 11 March 1198) was a Capetian princess who became Countess of Champagne by her marriage to Count Henry I of Champagne. She ruled the County of Champagne as regent during Henry I's absence from 1179 to 1181; during the minority of their son Henry II from 1181 to 1187; and during Henry II's absence from 1190 to 1197. She was the elder daughter of Eleanor of Aquitaine and Louis VII of France.

== Early life ==
Marie's birth was hailed as a "miracle" by Bernard of Clairvaux, an answer to his prayer to bless the marriage between Eleanor of Aquitaine and Louis VII. Marie was just two years old when her parents joined the Second Crusade to the Holy Land. With the birth of her sister Alix in 1150 instead of the desperately needed son and heir the couple hoped for, the marriage broke down and was annulled on 21 March 1152; Marie was seven and Alix was not yet two. Custody of the girls was awarded to their father. Eleanor married Duke Henry II of Normandy on 18 May. Louis married Constance of Castile in 1154. Just five weeks after Constance died while giving birth to their second child and daughter, he married Adele of Champagne on 13 November 1160, who gave birth to Philip Augustus in 1165.

== Marriage ==
In 1153, Marie was betrothed to Count Henry I of Champagne by her father Louis. These betrothals were arranged based on the intervention of Bernard of Clairvaux, as reported in the contemporary chronicle of Radulfus Niger. After her betrothal, Marie was sent to live with the Viscountess Elizabeth of Mareuil-sy-Aÿ and then to the abbey of Avenay in Champagne for her Latin-based education. In 1159, Marie married the count of Champagne. (Note: An 1159 charter refers to Marie as Trecensis comitissa indicating the marriage had taken place. The marriage date of 1164 is from Henri d'Arbois de Jubainville based on "a late and unreliable document".)

== Regencies ==
Marie became regent for Champagne when her husband Henry I went on pilgrimage to the Holy Land from 1179 until 1181. While her husband was away, Marie's father died and her half-brother, Philip Augustus, became king of France. He confiscated his mother's dower lands and married Isabelle of Hainaut, who was previously betrothed to Marie's eldest son. This prompted Marie to join a party of disgruntled nobles—including the queen mother Adela of Champagne and the archbishop of Reims—in plotting unsuccessfully against Philip. Eventually, relations between Marie and her royal brother improved. Marie's husband died soon after his return from the Holy Land in 1181, leaving her again as regent for their young son Henry.

Marie, who had retired to the Priory of Fontaines-les-Nonnes near Meaux (1187–1190), served again as regent for Champagne as her son Henry II joined the Third Crusade from 1190 to 1197. He remained in the Levant, marrying Isabella I of Jerusalem in 1192. Over the course of her regencies, Champagne was transformed from a patchwork of territories into a significant principality.

== Literary patronage ==
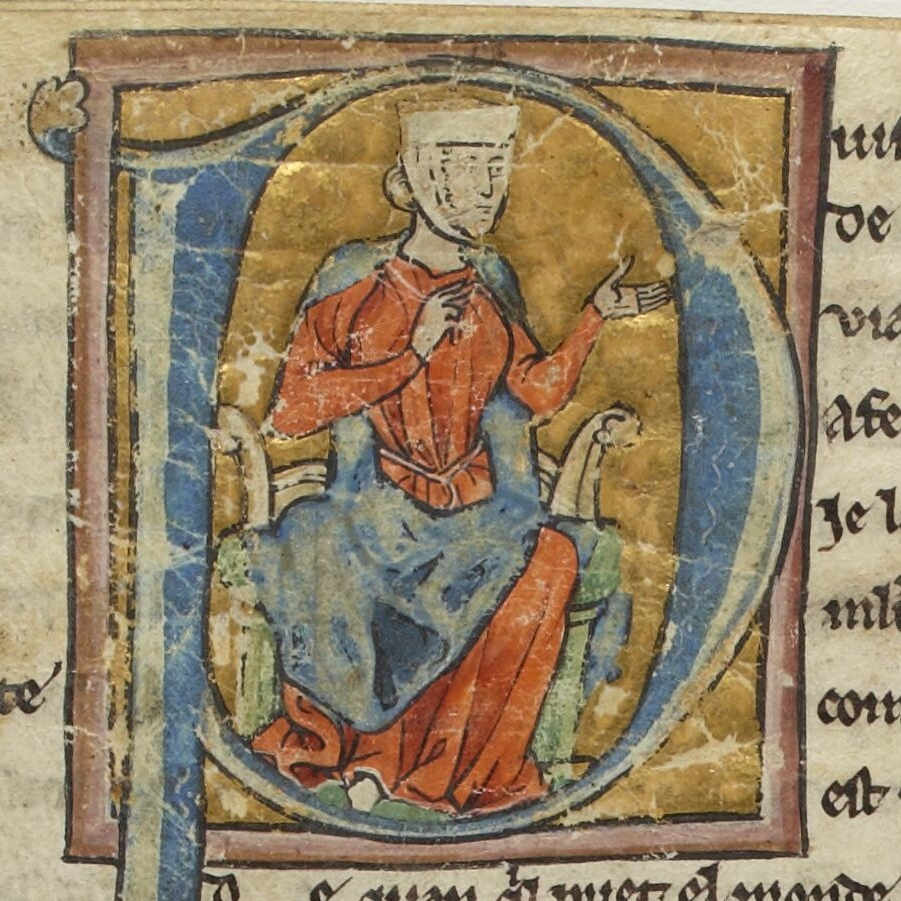
Marie pictured as patroness in a medieval manuscript

Marie was a patron of literature and her court became a sphere of influence on authors and poets such as Andreas Capellanus, who served in her court and referred to her several times in his writing, Chrétien de Troyes, who credits her with the idea for his Lancelot: The Knight of the Cart, the troubadours Bertran de Born and Bernart de Ventadorn, Gautier d'Arras and Conon de Bétune.

Being literate in both French and Latin, she amassed and maintained her own extensive library. Marie's maternal half-brother King Richard I of England mentions her in a stanza from his celebrated poem J'a nuns hons pris, lamenting his captivity in Austria, was addressed to her.

== Death ==
Marie died on 11 March 1198, not long after hearing the news of her son's death. She was buried in Meaux Cathedral.

On 25 June 1562, rioting Huguenots devastated many edifices, including the Cathedral of Meaux; it was on this occasion that the tomb of Marie of Champagne, located in the choir, was destroyed. (Note: McCash state Protestants during the reformation destroyed Marie's tomb. She gives no dates.)

== Issue ==
Marie and her husband Henri I of Champagne had:

- Henry II of Champagne (1166–1197), married Isabelle of Jerusalem in 1192
- Scholastique of Champagne (1172–1219), married William IV of Macon
- Marie of Champagne (c. 1174 – 1204), married Baldwin I of Constantinople
- Theobald III of Champagne (1179–1201), married Blanche of Navarre

== Genealogical table ==
Selective genealogy of Countess Marie

Henry II of England
Henry the Young King	Richard I of England

Eleanor of Aquitaine	Louis VII of France
Geoffrey II of Brittany	Henry I of Champagne	Marie of France	Alice	Margaret
Henry II of Champagne	Theobald III of Champagne	Marie	Scholastique

Adela
Philip II of France

Henry

Robert I of Dreux

Peter I of Courtenay
Peter II of Courtenay

== Sources ==
- Benton, John F. (1961). "The Court of Champagne as a Literary Center". Speculum. 36 (4): 551–591. doi:10.2307/2856785. ISSN 0038-7134. JSTOR 2856785. S2CID 161184362.
- Evergates, Theodore (2018). Marie of France: Countess of Champagne, 1145-1198 (1st ed.). Philadelphia: University of Pennsylvania Press. ISBN 978-0-8122-5077-0. OCLC 1033578543.
- Hanley, Catherine (2019). Matilda: Empress, Queen, Warrior. Yale University Press. ISBN 9780300245066.
- Kelly, Amy Ruth (1991). Eleanor of Aquitaine and the Four Kings. Harvard University Press.
- McCash, June Hall Martin (1979). "Marie de Champagne and Eleanor of Aquitaine: A Relationship Reexamined". Speculum. 54.4 (Oct): 698–711.
- McCash, June Hall (2008). "Chrétien's Patrons". In Grimbert, Joan Tasker; Lacy, Norris J. (eds.). A Companion to Chrétien de Troyes. Boydell & Brewer.
- Seaman, Gerald (2003). Busby, Keith; Dalrymple, Roger (eds.). "Reassessing Chretien's Elusive Vanz". Arthurian Literature XX. D.S. Brewer.
