= Scholastique of Champagne =

Countess of Mâcon from c.1183 to 1219

Scholastique of Champagne (also Scholastica; 1172–1219) was the daughter of Marie of France and Count Henry I of Champagne.

== Marriage and issue ==
She married William IV, Count of Mâcon (d. 1224) in approximately 1183. As part of her dowry Scholastique brought land as well as income from the fairs of Bar-sur-Aube. The couple produced the following issue:

1. Gerard II of Mâcon (d. 1224), married in 1220 to Guigone de Forez (d. 1240). His daughter Alix (died 1260) inherited rule of Mâcon after both William IV and Gerard II died in 1224.
2. Henry (d. 1233)
3. William (d. 1233)
4. Beatrice married in 1219 to Hugh, seigneur d'Antigny (1200–c. 1243)

== Death and burial at Troyes ==
Scholastique died in 1219 and was buried in collegiate church of Saint-Etienne in Troyes. The church contained the tombs of Marie, Countess of Champagne, Henry I, Count of Champagne, Marie of Champagne, Henry II, and Theobald. Her sister-in-law Countess-Regent Blanche of Navarre would later be buried there as well.

== Sources ==
- Gothic tombs of kinship in France, the low countries, and England – Anne McGee Morganstern, John A. Goodall
