= Ambly des Ayvelles =

French noble family

The Ambly des Ayvelles was the name of an old French noble family from the County of Champagne, France.

== History ==
They were first attested to in 1112, were recognized as counts in 1523, and as marquises in 1675. Following the French Revolution, members of the family emigrated to Austria and Prussia, where they became part of the German and Austrian nobility. In 1851, the German branches died out. The last Marquis, Charles François Louis d'Ambly, died in France, sometime after 1861.
