= Guy of Bazoches =

Guy of Bazoches (before 1146–1203) was a French cleric of the Champagne region, and writer in Latin. He was a canon of Châlons-sur-Marne.

He was a chronicler, of the Third Crusade in particular, in which he had taken part in the retinue of Henry II of Champagne, a poet, and a letter writer.
