= Henry II of Champagne =

Lord of the Kingdom of Jerusalem from 1192 to 1197

Henry II
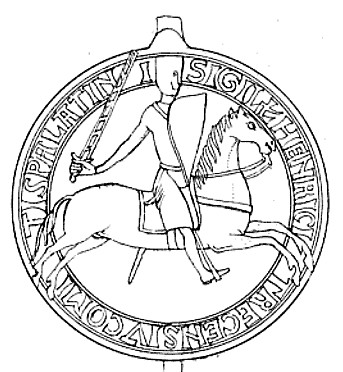

Count of Champagne
- Reign: 1181–1197
- Predecessor: Henry I
- Successor: Theobald III

Lord of the Kingdom of Jerusalem
- Reign: 1192 – 1197
- Co-ruler: Isabella I
- Born: 29 July 1166
- Died: 10 September 1197 (aged 31); Acre, Kingdom of Jerusalem
- Spouse: Isabella I of Jerusalem (m. 1192)
- Issue: Alice, Queen of Cyprus; Margaret of Champagne; Philippa, Lady of Ramerupt
- House: House of Blois-Champagne
- Father: Henry I, Count of Champagne
- Mother: Marie of France

Henry II (French: Henri; 29 July 1166 – 10 September 1197) was the count of Champagne from 1181 and the lord of the Kingdom of Jerusalem from his marriage to Isabella I of Jerusalem in 1192 until his death in 1197. He was an assertive ruler and was especially popular among his subjects in Palestine.

Henry was the eldest child of Count Henry I of Champagne and Marie of France. His mother was the half-sister of Kings Philip II of France and Richard I of England. Henry was betrothed in 1171 to Isabella of Hainaut, but Philip married her himself in 1180, causing a family rift and revolt against Philip. When Henry's father died in 1181, his mother ruled Champagne in Henry's name. Shortly before assuming personal rule, Henry negotiated a betrothal to Ermesinde, the infant daughter of Count Henry the Blind of Luxembourg and Namur. The count of Namur declared that Henry should succeed him, disinheriting his nephew Count Baldwin V of Hainaut, Philip's father-in-law. Philip sided with Baldwin, and Henry did not gain control of Luxembourg and Namur.

In 1190, Henry joined the Third Crusade, aimed at conquering Jerusalem back from Muslims. He had his barons recognize his young brother, Theobald, as his heir and left his lands under their mother's rule. He arrived at Acre in July 1190, heartening the Christian army besieging the city. Acre fell in 1191, after the arrival of Henry's half-uncles Philip and Richard. In April 1192, the barons of the Kingdom of Jerusalem chose Conrad of Montferrat, the husband of the royal heir Isabella, to be their king. Henry conveyed the news to Conrad, who was killed by Assassins within days. The nobles then elected Henry and he married Isabella.

The Third Crusade ended with the reestablishment of the Kingdom of Jerusalem on a narrow strip of land along the Palestinian coast excluding Jerusalem itself. Henry ruled the kingdom, but was never crowned its king. He had a difficult relationship with the Church but enjoyed the support of the barons. He responded resolutely when Pisan merchants plotted on behalf of the former king, Isabella's brother-in-law Guy of Lusignan, and had Guy's brother Aimery imprisoned. The same year, Henry allied with the Assassins and intervened in the conflict between Leo II of Armenia and Bohemond III of Antioch. In 1197, Henry reconciled with Aimery and arranged for his three daughters by Isabella to marry Aimery's sons. Soon after, he fell from his window and died. Aimery married Isabella and succeeded him, while Champagne passed to Theobald.

== Early life ==
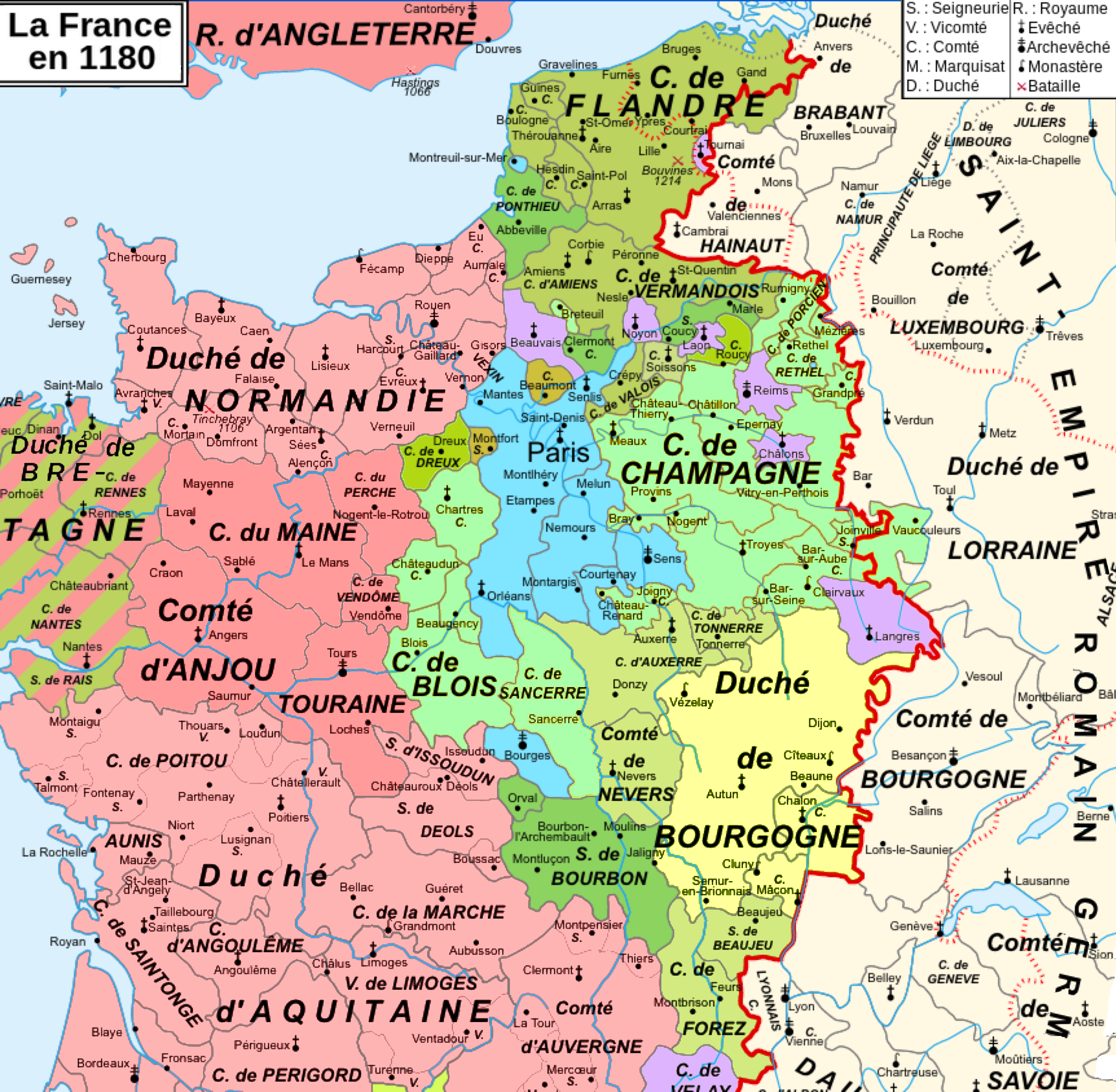
The County of Champagne (green) within the Kingdom of France in 1180

Henry was born on 29 July 1166. He was named after his father, Count Henry I of Champagne, who commissioned a luxurious gospel book for the Abbey of Saint Loup in Troyes to celebrate the birth of his firstborn son. (Note: Adorned with precious stones, the book's cover bore a silver relief showing the young Henry offering the volume to Saint Lupus of Troyes. The book was lost or dismantled after the French Revolution.) The boy's mother, Marie, was the elder daughter of King Louis VII of France and Duchess Eleanor of Aquitaine. After Eleanor and Louis divorced in 1152, Eleanor married King Henry II of England, while Louis married Count Henry's sister Adela. Adela bore Louis his only son, Philip, in 1165. Henry I was likewise well-connected: besides Queen Adela, his siblings included Counts Theobald V of Blois and Stephen I of Sancerre and Archbishop William of Reims.

In 1171, Count Henry and Count Philip I of Flanders arranged for the young Henry to marry Philip's niece, Isabella of Hainaut, and his sister Marie to marry Isabella's brother Baldwin. After Henry's brother Theobald was born in May 1179, Henry's betrothal to Isabella was confirmed by her father, Count Baldwin V of Hainaut. Shortly after this, Count Henry departed for the crusader states to lead an expedition in support of the Kingdom of Jerusalem, leaving Countess Marie to rule Champagne as regent.

In November 1179, King Louis VII, recently paralyzed, had his son Philip crowned king. Philip disliked his maternal family and immediately broke ties with his mother Adela and uncle Theobald. Count Philip I of Flanders emerged as King Philip's chief adviser and proposed that the young king take Henry's betrothed, Isabella, for himself. Philip and Isabella's marriage was celebrated in April 1180 to the indignation of the Champenois family. Theobald, his brothers William and Stephen, and their nephew Duke Hugh III of Burgundy revolted against King Philip; King Henry II of England mediated peace between King Philip and Queen Adela in June, and King Louis died in September.

Henry's relationship with the kings and queens of France and England and leading French barons

Theobald II of Champagne | Matilda of Carinthia
Henry II of England | Eleanor of Aquitaine | Louis VII of France | Adela of Champagne | Theobald V of Blois | Stephen I of Sancerre | William White Hands | Marie of Blois | Agnes of Champagne
Richard I of England | Henry I of Champagne | Marie of France | Philip II of France | Hugh III of Burgundy | Henry I of Bar
Henry II of Champagne | Marie of Champagne | Scholastica of Champagne | Theobald III of Champagne

== Count of Champagne ==
=== Minority ===
Count Henry returned to Troyes from Jerusalem gravely ill on 8 March 1181, and died in the evening of 16 March. Since Henry II was only 15 and would reach the age of majority when he turned 21, Countess Marie became regent in his name. She frequently associated Henry with herself in her acts, but in practice, she exercised the powers of the comital office alone. Henry seems to have been tutored privately at his parents' household rather than a religious institution or the court of another noble. Unlike his father, he was not highly intellectual, and although he sometimes sat at court with his mother, he does not appear to have been mentored in rulership. The young count joined Arnold V of Ardres, heir apparent to the County of Guînes, on a tournament circuit with a band of other young noblemen. Arnold travelled with a personal trainer in martial arts, and Henry became accomplished in arms as well as familiar with the lands of northern France as a result.

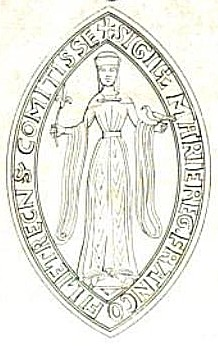
Henry's mother, Countess Marie, ruled Champagne during his minority and absence.

On 14 May 1181, Marie and her brothers-in-law reconciled with Count Baldwin of Hainaut, who promised another one of his daughters, Yolanda, to Henry. Baldwin's brother-in-law Count Philip of Flanders, Henry's aunt Queen Adela, and Count Henry I of Bar all swore to the new contract. At this occasion, the Champenois family plotted against King Philip, and their rebellion lasted until December of that year.

Henry's sister Marie married Baldwin, son of Count Baldwin of Hainaut, in 1185; Count Baldwin asked that Henry's marriage with Yolanda, who was then six years old, be postponed on account of her youth. Possibly because he had a brother to succeed him, Henry appears not to have been interested in marrying. In late 1186, a daughter, Ermesinde, was born to Count Baldwin's uncle Count Henry the Blind of Luxembourg and Namur. Henry the Blind had previously promised the succession of Namur to Baldwin, but now wished to make his infant daughter his heir. In March 1187, he sent his nephew Count Manasses IV of Rethel—a vassal of Henry of Champagne—to offer Ermesinde to Henry in marriage, and the betrothal was negotiated on 29 March. Baldwin, who was furious with Henry for jilting his daughter and dashing his hopes of inheriting Namur, began complaining to King Philip and Holy Roman Emperor Frederick Barbarossa. In July, Henry travelled to Namur to formalize the agreement, and Ermesinde's father had his men swear to accept Henry as his successor. Henry then had Ermesinde taken to Champagne, where she would be brought up.

=== Sole rule ===
Between March and July 1187, Henry accompanied his mother to Fontaines-les-Nonnes, a priory near Meaux, where she retired. He reached his majority on 29 July, becoming the ruler of a vast and wealthy feudal state and the most powerful baron in France. He was determined to start acting as count immediately, and issued a flurry of charters in his first year of rule. He called himself the count of Troyes, a title which he came to associate with all of his lands regardless of their location; simultaneously, he became commonly known as the count of Champagne. Henry was an assertive ruler: he resumed his father's title of count palatine—which his mother had eschewed—and had the comital chancery stop naming the witnesses who vetted his acts and instead record acts as being carried out under his sole authority.

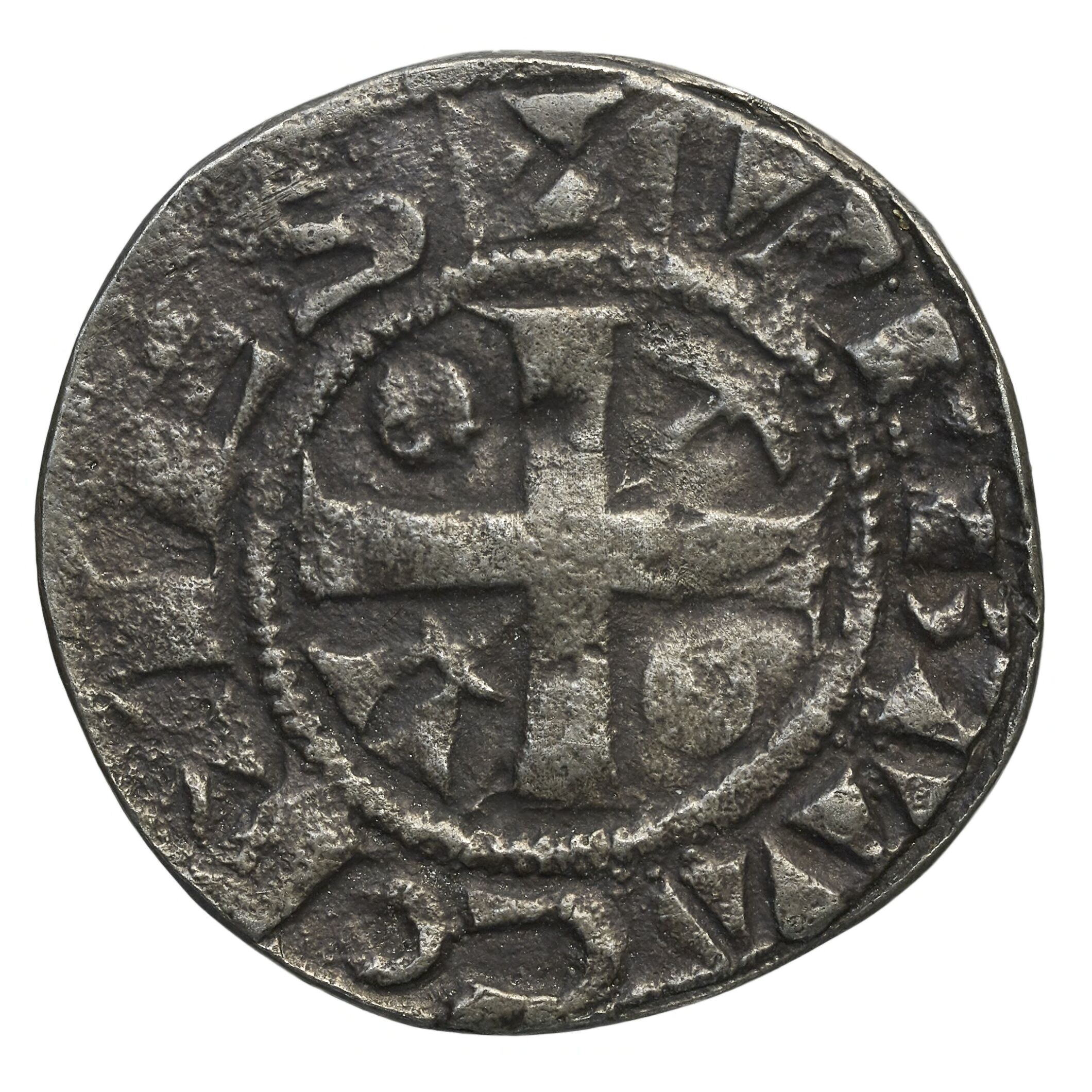
Money of Henry II. The wealth and size of Champagne made Henry the most powerful baron in France.

Henry's rule over Champagne was marked by a ceaseless conflict between his step-grandfather, King Henry II of England, and his half-uncle King Philip II of France. Henry feared that the constantly shifting alliances connecting the warring kings with Counts Baldwin of Hainaut and Henry of Namur might endanger the Champagne trade fairs, which were fundamental to the economic stability of Champagne. In one document, Henry acknowledged that a war between King Philip and Count Philip of Flanders would harm the trade fair of Saint-Ayoul at Provins by diminishing income from the event. Because many of Henry's financial obligations—such as fief-rents, prebends, and pensions—were financed by the fair, any decline in revenues would place those payments in jeopardy. In December 1187, Henry and his uncles, Archbishop William and Count Theobald, met with King Philip and Emperor Frederick between Ivoy and Mouzon. They then presented their case for Henry's succession to Namur, but neither Philip nor Frederick were convinced.

By late 1187, news of the conquest of Jerusalem by the Muslim Ayyubids had reached Europe, leading to calls for a Third Crusade. On 2 January 1188, Henry joined a gathering of barons and clergy in the field between Trie and Gisors, where the French and English kings pledged to cease hostilities and set out on crusade for Jerusalem. After the kings took the cross the next day, Henry and numerous other leading nobles followed suit. However, war broke out again when Count Richard I of Poitou, Count Henry's half-uncle and King Henry's son, attacked Count Raymond V of Toulouse, a vassal of King Philip, prompting Philip to invade Richard's land. When King Henry invaded Philip's land in turn, Count Henry assisted Philip. King Henry died on 6 July 1189, leaving both his crown and his conflict with Philip to Richard.

In 1188, Henry of Namur reconciled with Baldwin of Hainaut and gave him the administration of Namur. When the old count and his men grew discontented with Baldwin's rule, however, they appealed to Henry for help. Henry was still on campaign assisting King Philip when the envoys arrived, and it was Countess Marie who received them and sent knights to help fend off Baldwin. Henry seems to have still been on campaign when Troyes burned down on 23 July. Baldwin had some success, and while Henry left the royal army, he did not take military action, and negotiations continued. In early 1189, reports of Henry mobilizing an army reached Hainaut, and its people feared an invasion which did not materialize. In August 1189 at Pontoise, King Philip and Henry's uncles William and Theobald agreed that Baldwin would inherit Namur, including its fiefs and allodial land, while Henry would receive only the lordships of La Roche and Durbuy. Philip announced the agreement on 1 September. Henry refused to ratify it. In September, Henry marched north and once more failed to engage; he may have had to deal with a revolt of his vassal Hugh III of Broyes. Philip's settlement was a major setback for Henry, and Philip's thwarting of Henry's plans to gain Henry of Namur's lands permanently damaged their relationship.

Henry prepared to leave for Palestine in late 1189 and 1190. His mother returned to Troyes, and he made arrangements for the county's government and succession. In 1190, probably in April, he convened his barons at Sézanne, where they swore to acknowledge his 11-year-old brother, Theobald, as count in case Henry should die abroad. The Third Crusade attracted broad support in Champagne, and Henry left Troyes in May with a large army of Champenois barons and knights. Most of his officials followed him, including his chancellor, Haice of Plancy, his seneschal, Milo Breban, and probably his marshal, Geoffrey of Villehardouin. Unlike his father, who had left Marie to rule on her own, Henry sent mandates and sealed letters patent from abroad. By early June, he and his troops had arrived in Marseille. The grand prior of the Order of the Hospital in Arles approached Henry with a request to establish a Hospitaller house in Bar-sur-Aube, which Henry granted. The bishop of Troyes, Manasses of Pougy, died while Henry waited for his ship, and Henry sent Haice to take up the post. Henry and his followers departed on 20 June.

== Third Crusade ==
=== Campaigns ===
On 20 July 1190, Henry landed in Acre and joined King Guy of Jerusalem in besieging the city. Along with him came numerous important barons, including Counts Theobald V of Blois, Stephen I of Sancerre, Ralph I of Clermont, William III of Chalon, and John I of Ponthieu. Henry's arrival forced the Ayyubid ruler, Saladin, to pull back the main part of his army from Acre; the other part was already sent to watch the movements of a German crusader contingent led by Duke Frederick VI of Swabia. In addition to King Philip's train of siege engines, Henry brought soldiers, supplies, arms, and money, heartening the besieging army. Kings Richard I of England and Philip II of France had not yet arrived, and the crusading force thus lacked effective leadership; Henry held influence as the overlord of many of the French captains, but Frederick, Guy, and Marquis Conrad of Montferrat (who successfully defended Tyre and won the admiration of the Palestinian baronage) were likewise important.

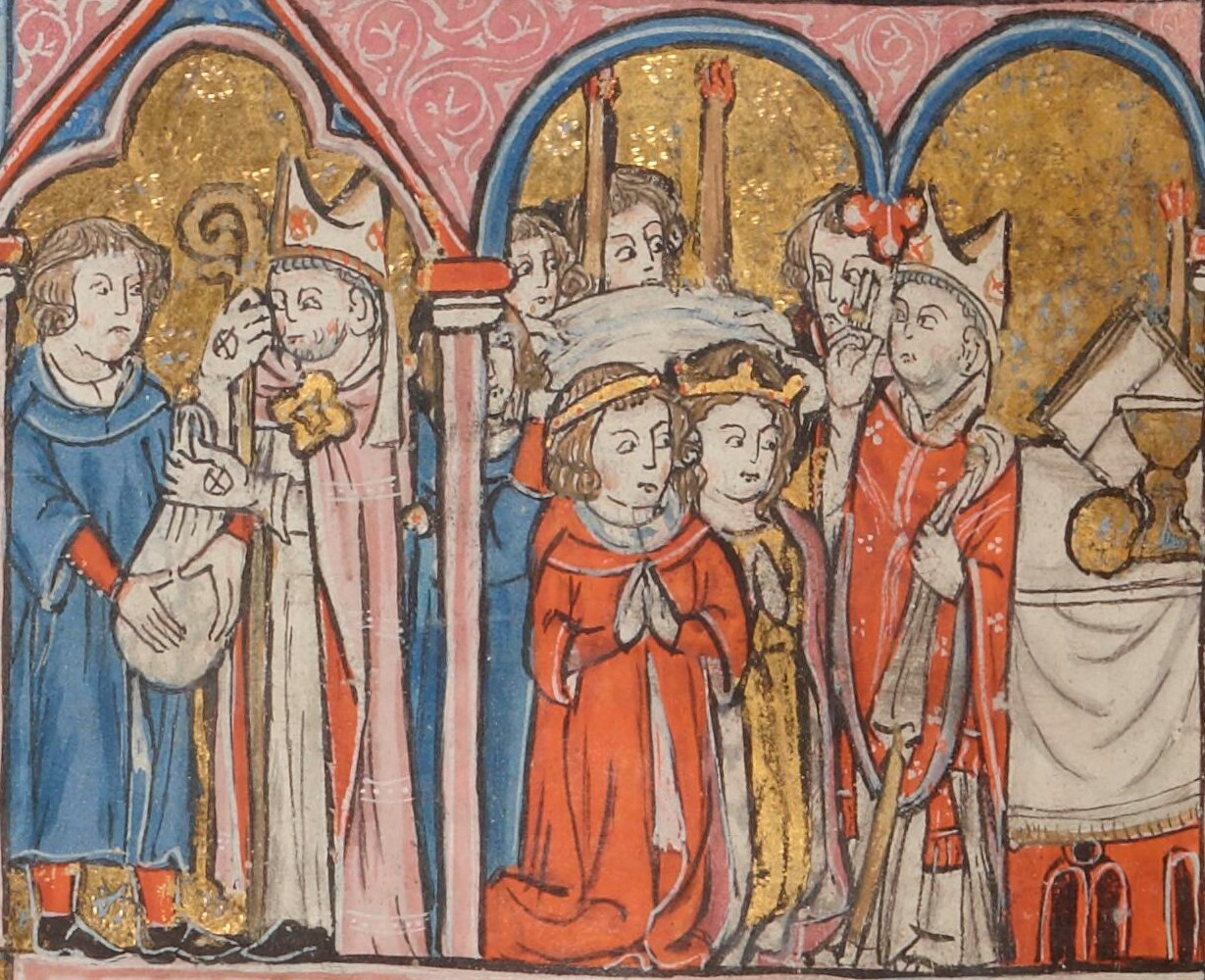
Isabella was forced to divorce Humphrey and marry Conrad, whom the barons of her kingdom wanted as their king.

Around Henry's arrival, disease spread both in the city and in the besiegers' camp. Guy's wife, Queen Sibylla, and their young daughters had died by 21 October; the barons of the Kingdom of Jerusalem insisted that Sibylla's successor was her half-sister Isabella I. Henry and Conrad were wounded on 15 November 1190. The barons wanted Conrad to marry Isabella and become king. Isabella's marriage to the unpopular baron Humphrey IV of Toron was annulled despite her protests. On 24 November, Henry's cousin Philip of Dreux, bishop of Beauvais, married Isabella to Conrad. Ayyubid archers ambushed the crusaders that day and showered the camp with arrows, killing many and capturing Henry's marshal, Geoffrey of Villehardouin.

Henry fell ill on 20 January 1191; the illness lasted many weeks, and he was not expected to survive. During the siege, many crusaders died, including Duke Frederick VI of Swabia; Henry's uncles Counts Rotrou IV of Perche, Theobald V of Blois, and Stephen I of Sancerre; his cousin Count Henry I of Bar; Count Philip I of Flanders; and numerous Champenois barons. King Philip arrived in Acre on 20 April; King Richard conquered Cyprus from the Byzantine rebel Isaac Komnenos in May, and made his way to the camp in Acre on 8 June. Henry ran out of money and asked Philip for a loan. Philip declined to give the loan unless Henry agreed to cede Champagne as a collateral, leading to a further deterioration in their relationship. Richard, who began to quarrel with Philip immediately after his arrival and sought to humiliate him, gave the money to Henry. In the dispute over the throne of Jerusalem, Philip favored Conrad and Isabella, while Richard stood with the widowed Guy. Conrad angrily withdrew to Tyre when Guy accused him of being a disobedient vassal.

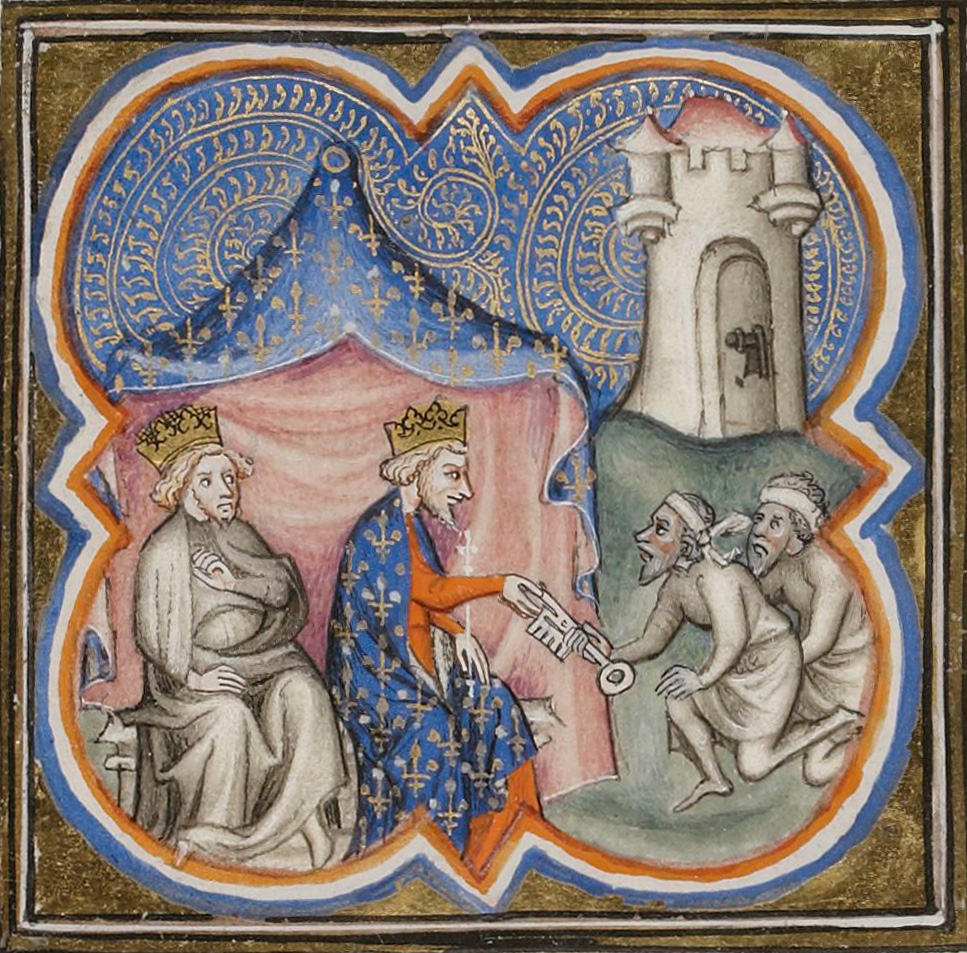
Acre surrendered to Philip and Richard after a long and arduous siege.

Acre fell to the crusaders on 12 July; both Richard and Philip were intent on returning to their kingdoms despite Henry's efforts to persuade them to stay. Philip left on 2 August, leaving Duke Hugh III of Burgundy as his lieutenant. Richard would stay longer, however, and on 25 August, he and Henry marched with their respective forces from Acre southwards along the coast. Richard expected that the Ayyubids would attack at Arsuf and carefully arrayed the army, with Henry guarding the baggage train and looking out for signs of attack. The crusaders' victory in the battle of Arsuf on 7 September dealt a significant blow to Ayyubid morale. Richard and Henry then proceeded south to Jaffa, which Richard granted to King Guy's brother Geoffrey of Lusignan. Richard respected Henry's leadership skills and relied on him for strengthening the defenses of the crusaders' ports. The crusaders realized that they could not hold Jerusalem for long even if they captured it and declined to lay siege to it. Hugh of Burgundy, along with many of the French crusaders, refused to proceed further south from Jaffa, but Henry accompanied Richard to Ascalon. In January 1192, their troops began fortifying the city.

=== Marriage ===
In April 1192, Richard too decided to return to his lands. On 16 April, he summoned the barons and knights of the Kingdom of Jerusalem to settle the dispute between Guy and Conrad, and they unanimously chose Conrad to be their new king. Richard accepted their decision and sent Henry to Tyre to inform Conrad of his election. Henry arrived around 20 April amid widespread celebration, and then promptly returned to prepare Acre for Conrad's coronation. On 28 April, however, two Assassins stabbed Conrad. As he lay dying, he commanded his pregnant wife, Isabella, not to deliver Tyre to anyone but Richard or a new king of Jerusalem; she thus shut herself in the city and refused Hugh of Burgundy's demands to hand it over. (Note: Conrad's assailants were sent by Rashid ad-Din Sinan, leader of the Order of Assassins. Contemporaries speculated that Sinan may have acted of his own accord or at the behest of one of four men: Humphrey of Toron, Guy of Lusignan, Saladin, and Richard of England. The historian Patrick A. Williams suggests that Henry should be viewed as a suspect too because he was the only one who profited from the murder; because he seems to have received news before Richard; and because he later allied himself with the Assassins.)

Upon hearing the news of Conrad's death, Henry hastened back to Tyre, where the people acclaimed him as the new ruler and Isabella proposed to marry him. Henry, who preferred to return to his lands in France, met with Richard in Acre to consult. Richard urged him to accept the election, but was hesitant about his marriage. Henry could not become the legitimate ruler of the kingdom without marrying Isabella, but he prevaricated because she was pregnant with Conrad's child, who–if a boy–might inherit the kingdom. The barons tried to assuage Henry's fears by promising that the kingdom would pass to Henry's children. With Richard's assent, Henry accepted both offers and received from him all the cities held by the crusaders. Henry married Isabella within a week of her being widowed and took up residence in Acre. (Note: Expressing his reluctance to marry and stay in Palestine, Henry reputedly said: "I shall be encumbered with the lady at a time when I can no longer return to Champagne." The speed with which Isabella remarried astonished contemporaries, with the author of the Eracles commenting: "On Tuesday the marquis was killed, and on Thursday Isabella was married to Count Henry." According to Ralph of Diceto, Henry married Isabella on 5 May, ten days after Conrad's death. A Muslim observer, Imad ad-Din al-Isfahani, was shocked to hear that Henry had married a pregnant widow.) Also in May, King Guy bought Cyprus and established himself as its ruler. Richard gave Henry the right to collect the one-time payment of 40,000 bezants from Guy.

After the wedding, Richard asked Henry to join the host at Ascalon with all the troops from Tyre and Acre. He proceeded to capture Darum, which he gave to Henry, who arrived with Hugh on 23 May 1192. Darum was the last Ayyubid fortress on the coast of Palestine, and its capture gave hope to the crusaders that Jerusalem too might be conquered. In June, Henry went to Acre to gather the crusaders who were still dallying in entertainment districts. The next month, he sent a message to Saladin in Jerusalem, announcing himself as the new lord of the Kingdom of Jerusalem and demanding that all its lands be given to him, while Richard's envoys commended Henry to Saladin's favor. Saladin attacked Jaffa on 27 July while the crusaders were in Acre; when Richard learned of it two days later, he sent Henry south with an army while he went by sea, and they repelled the Ayyubids.

The Third Crusade ended on 2 September with the signing of a peace treaty, by which the Kingdom of Jerusalem was reconstituted as a narrow coastal strip of land extending south to Jaffa. Henry swore to the treaty in Richard's name along with his vassal Balian of Ibelin and the masters of the military orders—the Templars and the Hospitallers. Richard left on 11 October, making Henry the leader of the Catholic forces in Palestine. When Henry's marriage to Isabella became known in France, his mother returned the six-year-old Ermesinde to her family.

== Lord of the Kingdom of Jerusalem ==
=== Administration ===
On his marriage to Isabella, Henry became the effective ruler of the Kingdom of Jerusalem—consisting of the royal cities of Acre and Tyre and the lordships of Jaffa, Arsuf, Caesarea, and Haifa—but he never assumed the royal title and continued to call himself simply count palatine of Troyes. (Note: The reason for Henry's decision to not call himself king of Jerusalem is not clear. He may have abstained because Guy, who was crowned king, lived until 1194; because he hoped to recover Jerusalem first; because public opinion was against it; or because the Church would not sanction it. On one occasion (March 1196), he called himself lord of Jerusalem.) Henry ruled this land in the name of his wife, Isabella, and regularly noted that he acted by her "wish and consent". He took her with him when he travelled around the kingdom; the Itinerarium Regis Ricardi remarks that he "could not yet bear to be parted from her"; because his authority was still insecure, he likely relied on Isabella's presence to reinforce his legitimacy. Isabella's child with Conrad turned out to be a daughter, Maria. Isabella and Henry then had three daughters: Alice, Margaret (who died as a child), and Philippa.

As an uncrowned ruler, Henry had a limited scope of action: when the canons of the Holy Sepulchre elected Aymar the Monk as the new Latin patriarch of Jerusalem, Henry arrested them in anger for not having been consulted, but even his supporters pointed out that he had no right to do that because he was not king. Pope Celestine III rebuked him, and his chancellor, Archbishop Josias of Tyre, persuaded him to release the canons and appease the patriarch with a grant of a rich fief near Acre to the patriarch's nephew.

Henry enjoyed better relations with his lay vassals. He was supported by the military orders and the leading baron, Balian of Ibelin, who was his wife's stepfather. He sought to share power with the established nobility rather than favor his Champenois entourage, making Ralph of Tiberias his seneschal. He also encouraged the veterans of the Third Crusade to settle in the kingdom, arranging for Thierry of Tenremonde, Thierry of Orgue, and Aymar of Lairon to marry local heiresses and thus become his vassals; all three men gained prominent places in his court. Henry simultaneously established a modus vivendi with his Muslim neighbors. He asked Saladin for a tunic and a turban, which he then wore in Acre as a mark of mutual esteem. Saladin's secretary, Ibn al-Athīr, described Henry as "a capable man, pleasant and tolerant".

As his obligations in Palestine grew, Henry gradually became less involved with the government of Champagne. He relied heavily on the wealth of his French lands to support the crusader kingdom. His mother sent all she could, and even had to borrow, to help him pay debts incurred in Acre.

=== Intrigues ===
The Pisan merchants resented the favor Henry showed to their Genoese rivals and plotted to deliver Tyre to Guy. Henry discovered the conspiracy in May 1193, arrested the plotters, and decreed that the Pisan colony in Tyre be reduced to 30 people. After the Pisans retaliated by raiding villages between Tyre and Acre, Henry expelled them from Acre. He doubted the loyalty of Guy's brother, Aimery of Lusignan, who had retained the office of constable of Jerusalem and received the County of Jaffa from the third brother, Geoffrey. When Aimery intervened on behalf of the Pisans, Henry arrested him. Aimery argued that Henry had no right to imprison a vassal and constable, while Henry denied that Aimery was either and demanded that Guy surrender Cyprus in exchange for Aimery's freedom. The barons and the masters of the military orders prevailed on Henry to relent and release Aimery, who gave up Jaffa and the constableship and left for Cyprus. Henry granted the constableship to Isabella's half-brother, John of Ibelin.

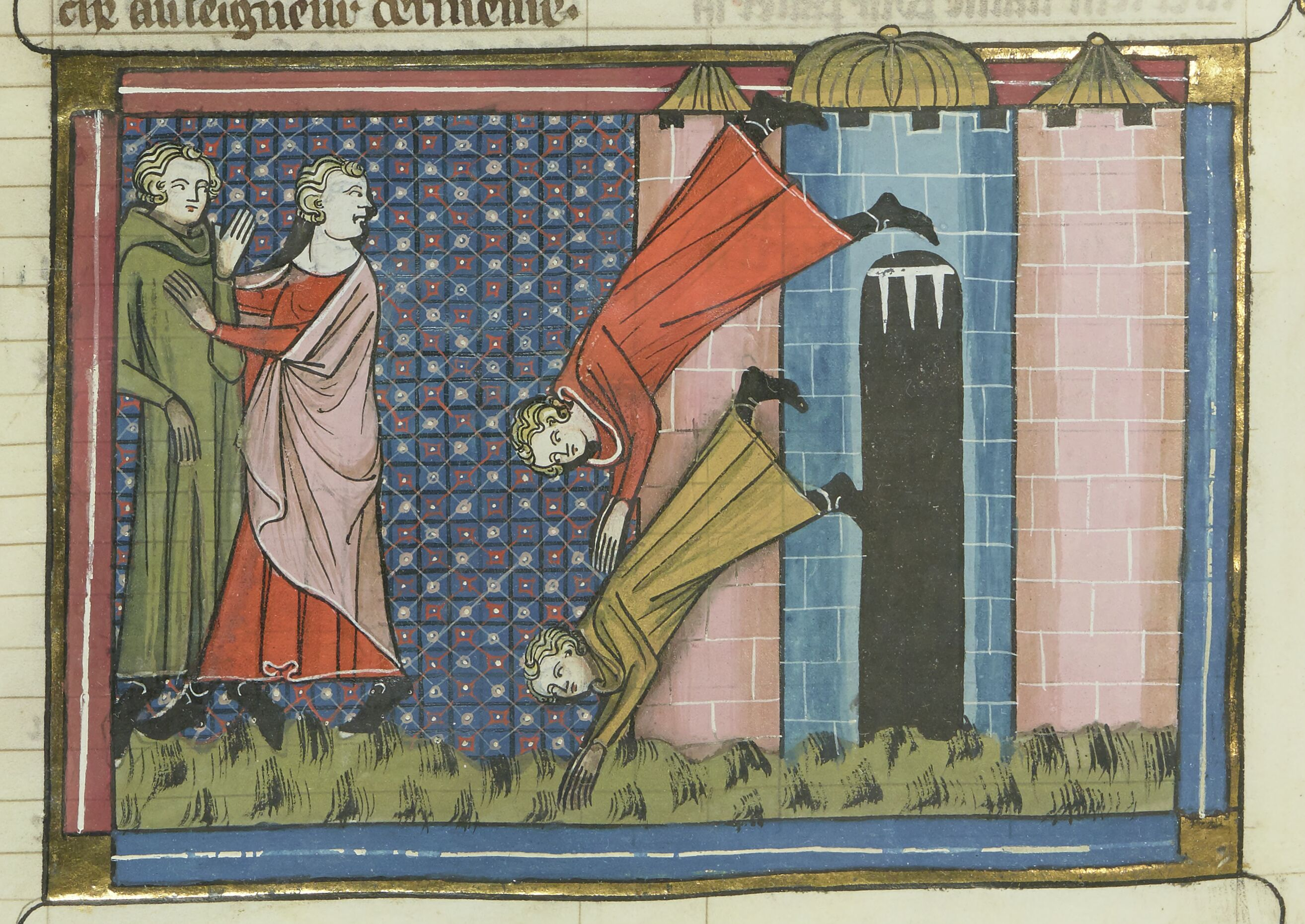
The Assassins hosted Henry in their mountain stronghold, allegedly entertaining him with ritual suicides until he begged them to stop.

The lord of Armenian Cilicia, Leo II, captured Prince Bohemond III of Antioch in a ruse in 1194 after a dispute over the possession of the castle of Baghras. Bohemond's son Raymond appealed to Henry for help. Henry moved north to support Raymond when an embassy from the Assassins approached him. Their master sent an apology for the murder of Conrad and invited Henry to visit him at Al-Kahf Castle in the Nosairi mountains. According to a tale thereafter repeated in Europe, the hosts entertained Henry by showing how willingly the Assassins would leap off the mountain side to their deaths at the wave of their master's hand until Henry begged them to stop. Henry left with costly gifts and promises that any enemies he named would be assassinated. He then proceeded to Antioch and into Cilicia, meeting Leo near Sis. They agreed that Leo would release Bohemond without ransom and retain Baghras, and that neither would owe fealty to the other. This intervention in the affairs of the northern crusader states, reminiscent of the policy of the early kings of Jerusalem, increased Henry's standing upon his return south.

=== Lusignan alliance ===
Upon Guy's death in 1194, Aimery became lord of Cyprus. Henry demanded, as the successor of the kings of Jerusalem, to be consulted about the succession in Cyprus, but could not enforce his claim. The already diminished Kingdom of Jerusalem faced the prospect of renewed Ayyubid attack once the truce expired in 1196. Leading barons and merchant elites increasingly regarded the continuing rivalry between Henry and Aimery as harmful to the interests of both states. Many had interests both on the island and on the mainland, such as the Bethsan family, and pressed Henry to reach an accommodation with Aimery. Aimery's constable, Baldwin of Bethsan, came to Acre and persuaded Henry to meet with Aimery in 1197. The two rulers reconciled and forged an alliance, whereby the three sons of Aimery were betrothed to the three daughters of Henry and Isabella. Henry and his wife promised to restore Jaffa to the Lusignans as their daughters' dowries, and the debt Aimery owed to Henry for Guy's purchase of Cyprus was remitted.

When the German Crusade arrived in Acre in August 1197, Henry was reluctant to start another war. Henry's aunt Queen Margaret of Hungary came along with the Germans; when she died eight days after her arrival, she left all her possessions to Henry. Aimery of Lusignan accepted German suzerainty and was consequently crowned king of Cyprus in September. The Germans invaded Galilee without consulting Henry. When they heard about the approach of a vast Ayyubid army, the German knights abandoned the infantrymen and fled. Henry took the advice of Hugh of Tiberias and had his own knights and Italian soldiers reinforce the German infantrymen. The Ayyubids declined to engage and marched on Jaffa instead.

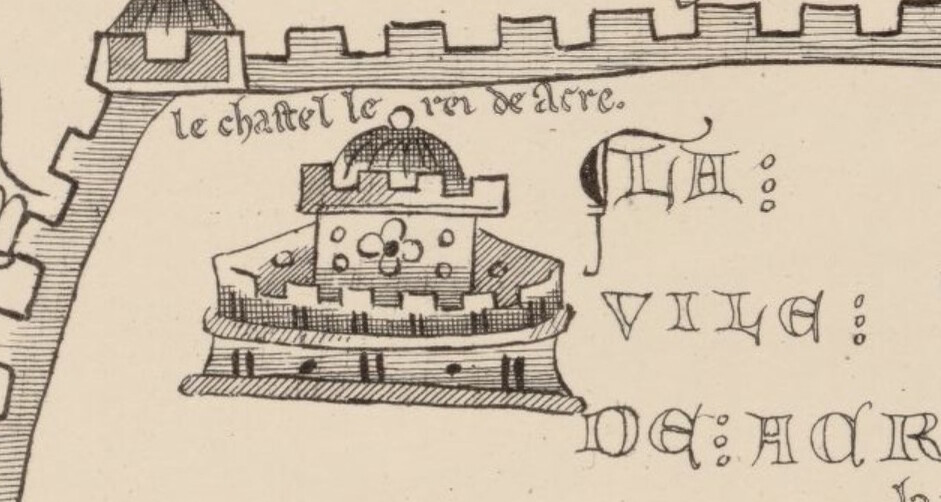
Henry fell to his death from a window of the royal castle in Acre.

Henry was still with Aimery when news reached them of Ayyubid attack on Jaffa. Aimery sent one of his barons, Reynald Barlais, to defend Jaffa, but Reynald did not take the task seriously and Henry mustered his own men in Acre. Henry died on 10 September when he fell out of a window of the palace in Acre; the circumstances of the fall are not clear. (Note: Sources differ in their reports of Henry's death.: In the earliest account, the Chronicle of Ernoul and Bernard the Treasurer, Henry dies instantly after leaning forward through the window while washing his hands before dinner. His valet then jumps out of fear of being accused of having pushed him, but survives with a broken leg; rumors circulate that Henry was killed when the valet landed on top of him. A tumultuous search for Henry takes place in the night until the valet alerts the guards. Ernoul states that Henry had repeatedly asked that that window be barred out of concern for the safety of his daughters; the bars were added after his death.; In the Colbert-Fontainebleau version of Eracles, Henry plans to assemble a fleet to defend Jaffa and for that reason meets with Pisan envoys in his chamber, which has at least two windows side by side, one with a grate and one without. Henry initially leans with his back to the window with the grate, advances to greet the Pisans, and then leans backwards through the window without the grate; unable to find support, he falls and breaks his neck, dying instantly. His valet is a dwarf named Scarlet, and he attempts to save Henry by grabbing his clothes, but falls and dies with him. There is no frantic search because the fall is witnessed by the Pisans, who immediately descend and recover the bodies. Henry's widow, Isabella, tears her clothes and hair in grief and kisses his body. At the funeral the following day, Scarlet is buried at Henry's feet.; In the Lyons version of Eracles, the army mustered for the defense of Jaffa gathers in the palace courtyard at daytime. Henry reviews the troops through a barred window, but the bars give way when he leans against them to look out and he falls into the moat. His dwarf, Scarlet, throws himself from the window in fear and sorrow, and it is Scarlet's landing on top of him that kills Henry.; The latest account, Gran conquista de Ultramar, appears to try to combine elements from the earlier versions. Henry washes his hands for dinner with his back turned to the window, then trips on a carpet or on a hood-shaped headdress, and falls to his death. The dwarf grabs his clothes in an attempt to save him, but falls down with him; and then the valet jumps out of fear of being held responsible, but survives with a broken leg.) He was buried in the Church of the Holy Cross in Acre. The Germans arranged for Henry to be succeeded by Aimery, who promptly married Henry's widow and was crowned king.

== Legacy ==
The news of Henry's death reached Champagne in October 1197. The county passed to his younger brother, Theobald III, and then to Theobald's posthumous son, Theobald IV, rather than to Henry's daughters. Theobald III's widow, Blanche of Navarrre, promoted Theobald IV's claim to Champagne by attempting to have Henry's daughters with Isabella declared illegitimate on the grounds that Isabella's first marriage, with Humphrey of Toron, had not been lawfully annulled. Pope Innocent III wrote that both Conrad and Henry were punished for marrying Isabella, one by the sword, the other by the fall.

The historian Sidney Painter considers Henry's arrival probably decisive in the eventual capture of Acre. Henry was well liked in the crusader kingdom, and the Templars and the Hospitallers lamented Henry's death because he had drawn so much on the revenues of Champagne for the benefit of the Kingdom of Jerusalem. The historian Steven Runciman concludes that Henry emerged as a capable ruler through tact, perseverance, reliance on able advisers, and a willingness to learn from experience, despite possessing "no outstanding natural gifts".

== Notes ==
Regnal titles
| Preceded by Isabella I as sole ruler | Lord of the Kingdom of Jerusalem; 1192–1197 with Isabella I | Succeeded by Isabella I as sole ruler |
| Preceded by Henry I | Count of Champagne; 1181–1197 | Succeeded by Theobald III |
