= Nicholas of Clairvaux =

Nicholas of Clairvaux, also Nicholas of Montiéramey (French: Nicolas de Clairvaux, Nicolas de Montiéramey; b and d 12th century) was a French Benedictine monk who later became a Cistercian monk. He was a secretary of Saint Bernard of Clairvaux (until Saint Bernard dismissed him), and the author of letters and sermons.

== Life ==
Nicholas entered the monastic life at Montiéramey Abbey, a Benedictine monastery near Troyes in Champagne. In 1145 or 1146, he entered the Cistercian Clairvaux Abbey and became one of the secretaries of Bernard of Clairvaux. He committed several misdemeanours and was expelled from Clairvaux in 1151, after a visit to Cluny Abbey, for having used the seals of the abbot of Clairvaux without authorisation. After Bernard's death in 1153, Nicholas was in Rome and presented a manuscript of Bernard's sermons to the pope, Pope Adrian IV. He was on good terms with the pope's chancellor Roland Bandinelli, who later was elected Pope Alexander III. Nicholas soon returned to Montiéramey. Despite the disgrace of having been dismissed by Bernard, he succeeded in gaining the good opinion of Count Henry I of Champagne, whose service he entered. In 1160, Nicolas became prior of Saint-Jean-in-Châtel, priory of Montiéramey. He died in either 1176 or 1178.

== Works ==
Nicholas was the author of letters and of sermons characterised by the use of rare terms, the striving for a high-flown style without genius, and a tendency to plagiarism. The deficiencies of his letters often thrown doubt upon their accuracy. He is noted for having attributed to himself several texts and sermons by other authors, particularly Hugues de Saint-Victor (Adnotationes in Psalmos), and above all Saint Bernard, at least 19 of whose sermons were claimed by Nicholas as his own.

Some works were also attributed to Peter Damian in Patrologia Latina. Dom Tissier was the first to spot this, and pointed out the true origin of these sermons to Dom Luc d'Achery.

10 liturgical sequences have also been attributed to Nicholas.

== Sources ==
- Benton, J. F., 1981: "Nicolas de Clairvaux" in the Dictionnaire de Spiritualité Ascétique et Mystique, vol. 11, n°72-73, pp. 255–259. Chantilly
- Leclercq, Jean (1956): Les collections de sermons de Nicolas de Clairvaux, Rev. Bén. 66 (1956), pp. 269–302, especially 284–285, included in Leclercq, Jean (ed.) (1962: "Recueil d’études sur saint Bernard et ses écrits", vol. 1, pp. 47–82. Rome: Edizioni di Storia et Letteratura
