= Meaux Cathedral =

Roman Catholic cathedral in Meaux, France

- Cathédrale Saint-Étienne de Meaux
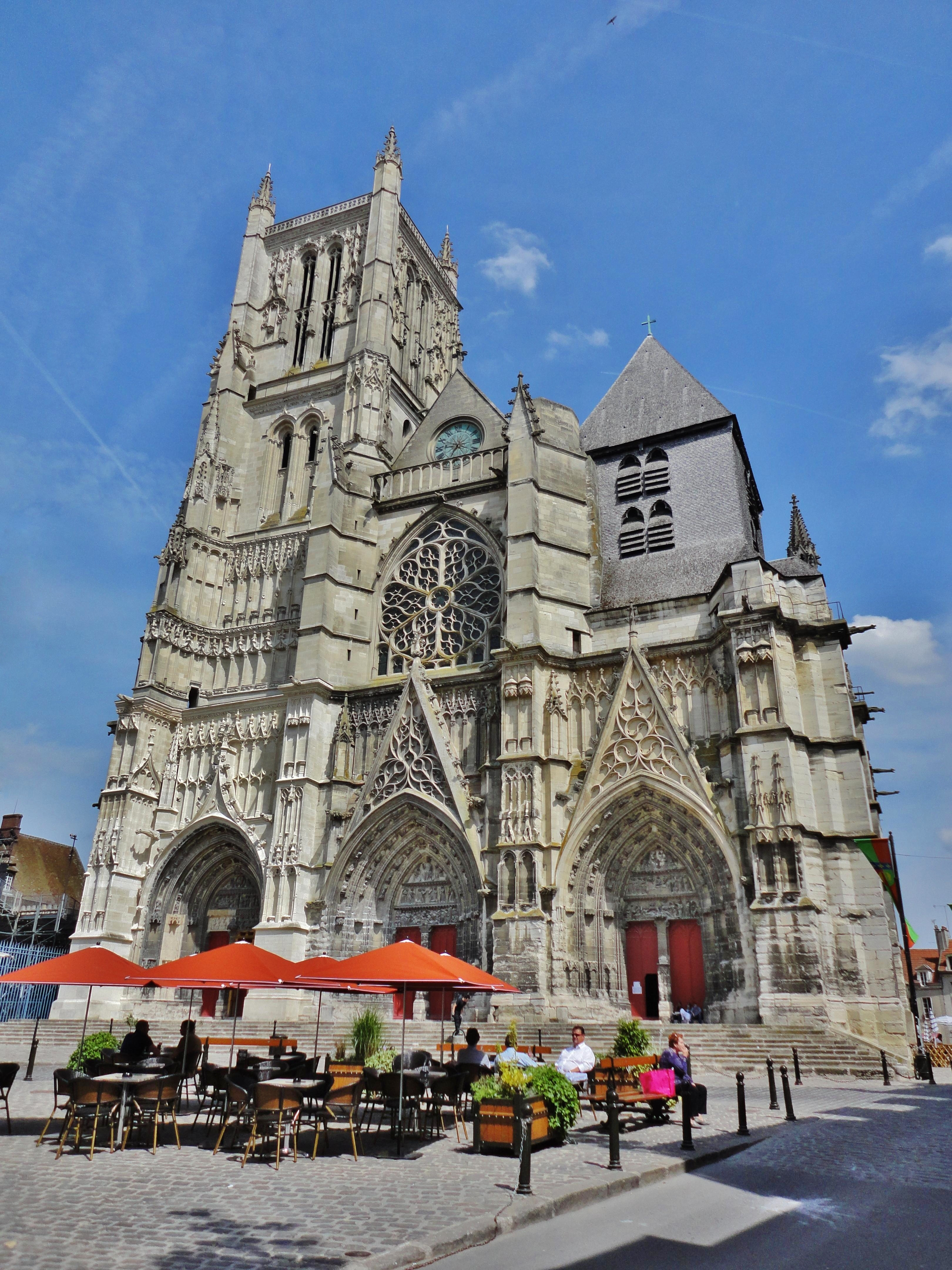
- Meaux Cathedral
- Meaux Cathedral
- 48°57′36″N 2°52′44″E
- Location: Meaux, France
- Denomination: Roman Catholic Church
- Churchmanship: Roman

History
- Status: Cathedral

Architecture
- Functional status: Active
- Architectural type: Church
- Style: Gothic, Gothic Revival
- Groundbreaking: 1175; 851 years ago
- Completed: 1540; 486 years ago

Specifications
- Height: 48 m (157 ft 6 in)
- Materials: Stone

Administration
- Province: Meaux

Monument historique
- Official name: Cathédrale Saint-Étienne de Meaux
- Type: Classé
- Designated: 1840
- Reference no.: PA00087087

Meaux Cathedral (French: Cathédrale Saint-Étienne de Meaux, lit. 'Meaux St. Stephen Cathedral') is a Roman Catholic church in the town of Meaux, Seine-et-Marne, France, and a cathedral as the seat of the Bishop of Meaux. It is a historical monument of France.

== History ==
Construction began around 1175, just twelve years after Notre-Dame de Paris to replace an earlier Romanesque church dedicated to Saint Stephen. By 1200, the ambulatory, three radiating chapels, choir, and gallery completed, followed by the crossing, vaulted nave, transept, and triforium between 1220-1235 as depicted in a drawing by Villard de Honnecourt. As early as 1198, the widow of Henry I was buried inside the unfinished cathedral. Despite its imposing nature, the cathedral had been rushed to completion, and just 50 years after its construction, the choir with its excessively heavy galleries and poor construction was beginning to sink into the ground. To resolve this response, architect Gautier de Varinfroy, who was still working on Évreux Cathedral at the time, was hired by Bishop Jean de Poincy and Joan I of Navarre to completely demolish and rebuild the cathedral.

The current structure built in the Rayonnant Gothic style, was erected between 1253 and 1278, and to resolve the problem of the choir's stability, Varinfroy removed the gallery level from the choir but retained the openings onto its central section, a technique he also implemented in Rouen Cathedral. Subsequently, the three apsidal chapels were also raised to match the new height of the ambulatory, and a new facade reminiscent of Notre-Dame de Paris complete with a three large portals was constructed. Due to a lapse of funding, construction halted with only one of the two bell towers being constructed and a partial completion of the nave. In 1317, Philip V of France and later Charles IV donated land and funds for construction, and in 1335, King Philip VI authorized the extension of the nave by three bays, the last ones located on the west side of the building. Work then resumed, but only on the right half of the first three bays and the right and central doors of the west facade, before another pause in 1358 following the breakout of the Jacquerie and the Hundred Years' War. Work resumed in 1390, with the construction of the left section of the first three bays, which lasted until 1410 before stopping again following the occupation of the city by the English.

Towards the end of the Middle Ages, construction resumed on the cathedral, which was now done in the prevailing Flamboyant Gothic style, with the north portal and first north lateral chapel finished before 1506, and the north tower's completion in 1540, marking the completion of the church. During the late 16th century, carvings throughout the church were damaged by Protestant Huguenots, and from 1562, no further work was done on the building. As a result, the second bell tower was never constructed, and a tall spire over the transept fell into ruin and was removed in 1610. The archives of the diocese were destroyed during the French Revolution in 1794, erasing much knowledge about the early history of the church. Despite these damages, the composer Pierre Moulu worked at the cathedral in the early 16th century.

By the late 19th century, the cathedral had fallen into disrepair, and was deemed at risk of collapse. Led by architects such as Jean-Charles Danjoy, the structure underwent significant 19th-century restorations from 1839 to 1894, involving the rebuilding of the choir perimeter, nave flying buttresses, and Neo Gothic modifications to the nave. The cathedral was also classified as a historic monument in 1840. In September 1916, on the second anniversary of the First Battle of the Marne a service of thanksgiving was held. celebrating the French victory, and a commemorative plaque was installed inside the cathedral to pay tribute to the British soldiers killed in the war.

== Architecture ==
Because of its construction period, the design of the cathedral encompasses several periods of Gothic architecture. The cathedral rises to a height of 48 meters; inside, the vaults at the choir rise to 33 meters. The interior ornamentation is noted for its smoothness, and the space for its overall luminosity. The cathedral also contains a famous organ, built in the 17th century.

== Burials ==
- Jacques-Bénigne Bossuet
- Bishop Louis Pierre Joseph Cornet (31 October 1923 - 11 September 2006)
- Marie of France, Countess of Champagne
- Saint Fiacre
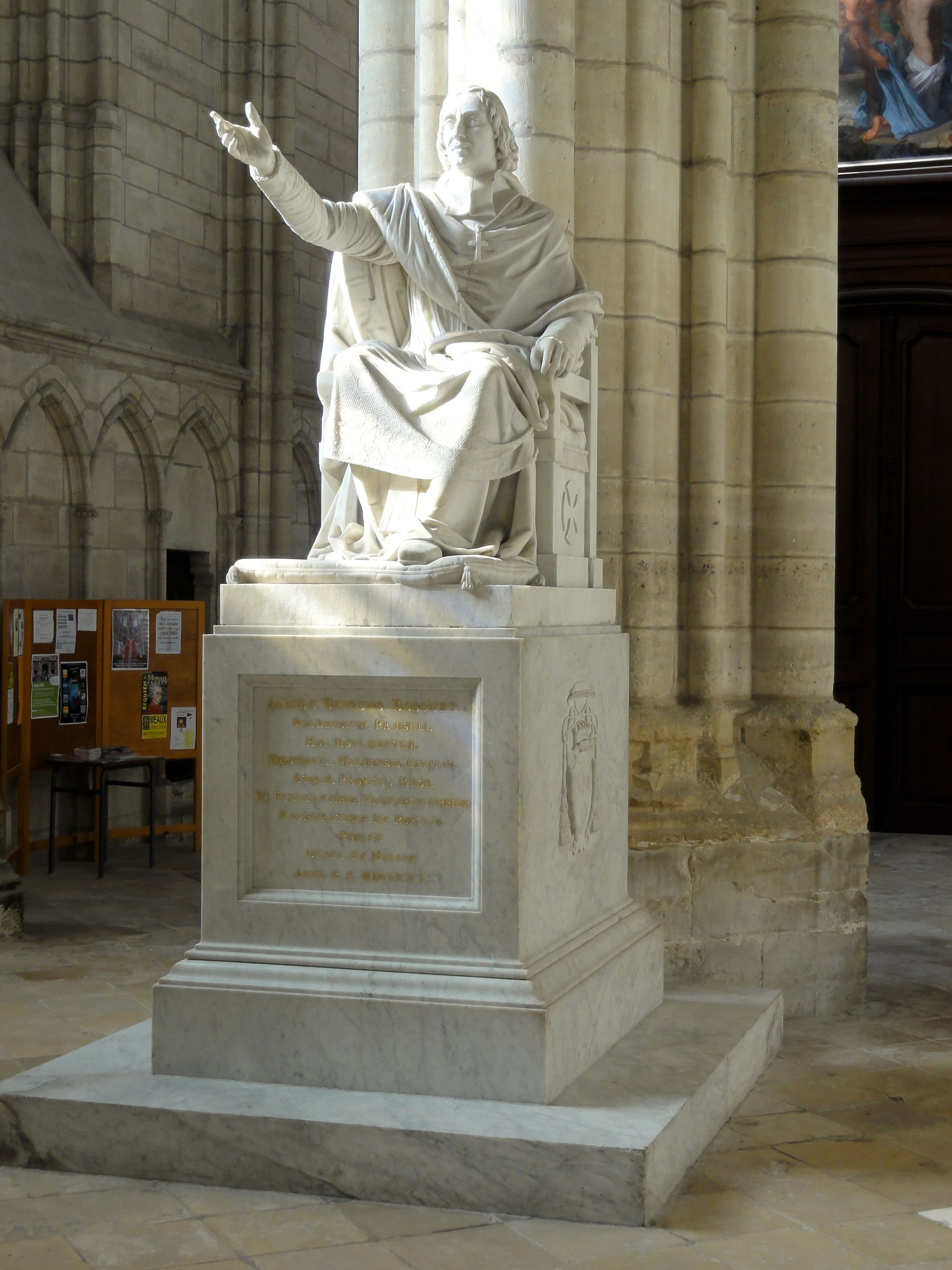
monument commémoratif de Bossuet (1820)

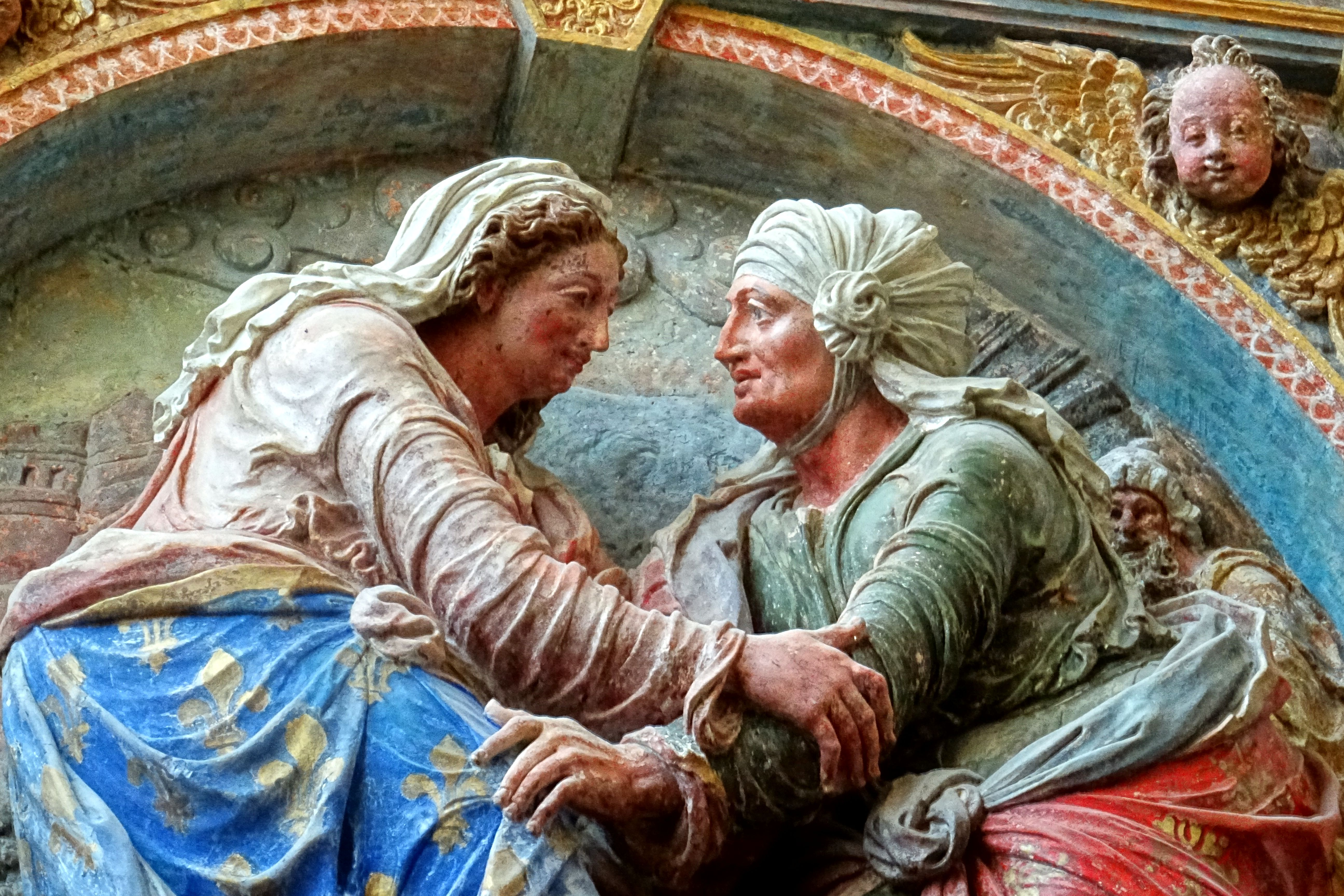
la Visitation

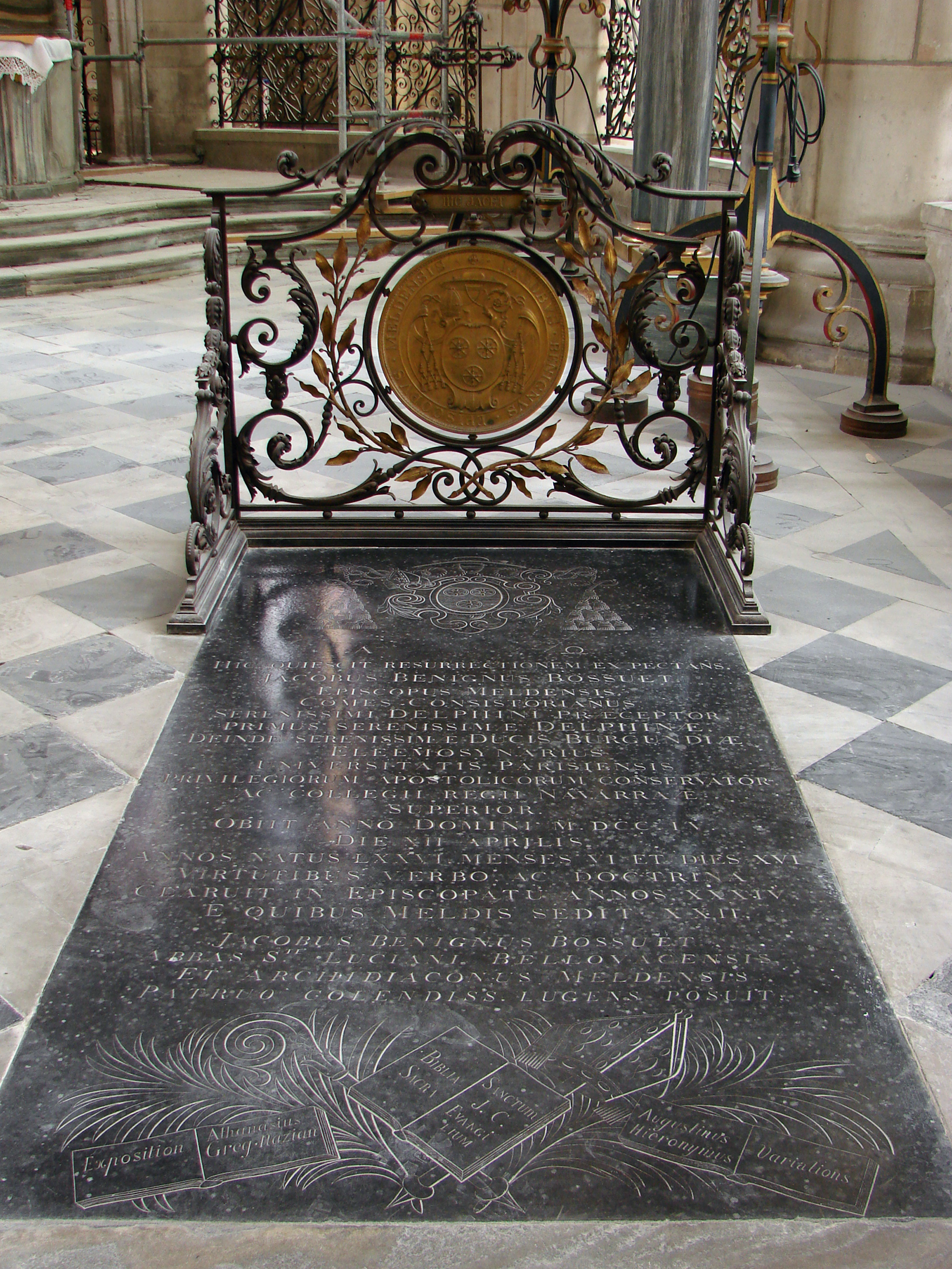
Tomb of Bossuet

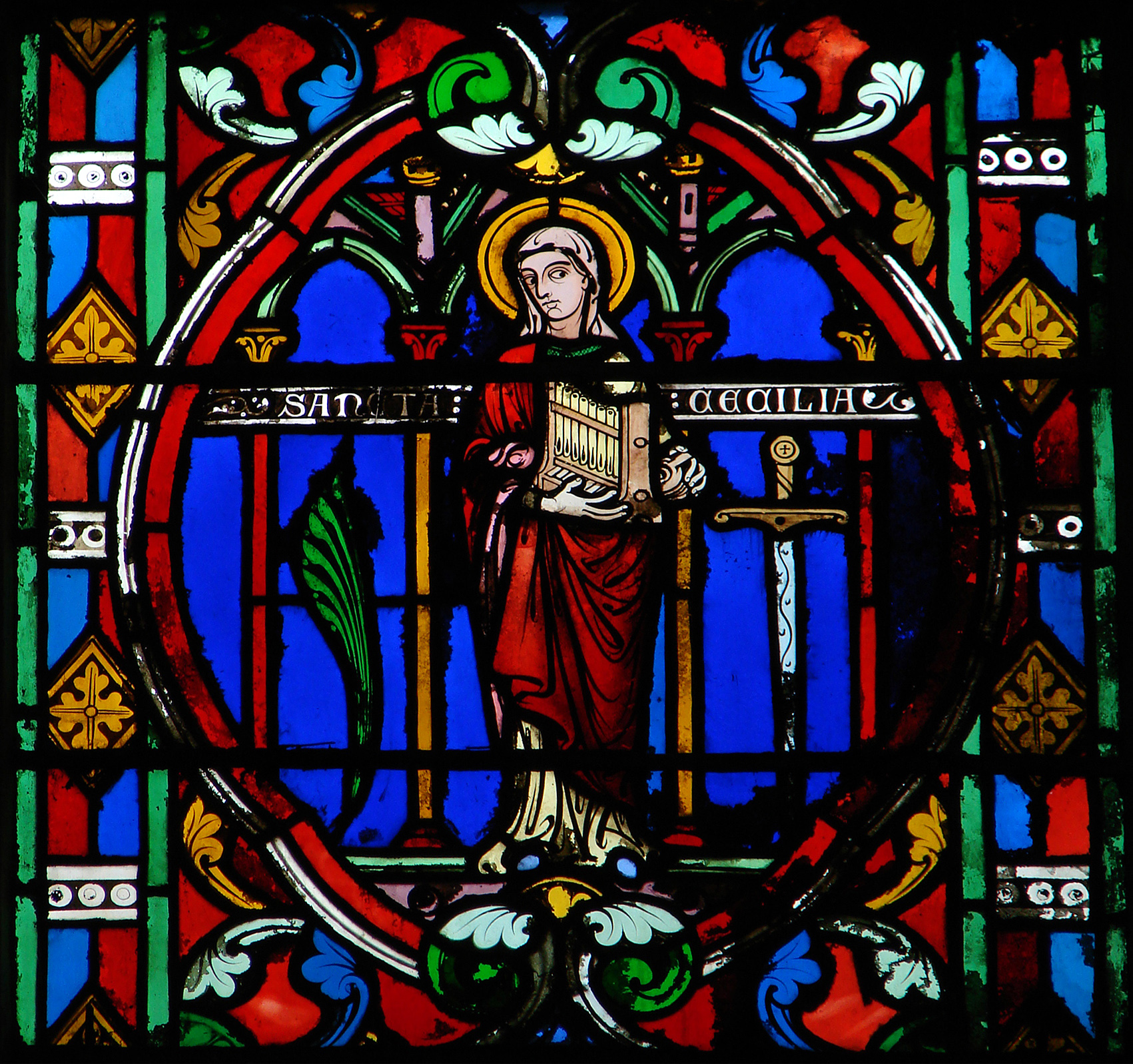
Ste Cécile, 1869

== See also ==
- List of Gothic cathedrals in Europe

== Sources ==
- Dictionnaire des églises de France, Belgique, Luxembourg, Suisse (Tome IV-D). pp. 104–106. Robert Laffont: Paris.
- Esquieu, Yves, 1994: Quartier cathédral. Rempart / Desclée de Brouwer: Paris. ISBN 2-904365-23-0
