= Simon Chèvre d'Or =

French poet

Simon Chèvre d'Or (or Simon Aurea Capra) was poet and a canon at the Abbey of St. Victor, Paris in the 12th century. It is believed that Simon was commissioned by Henry I, Count of Champagne to write three poems in Latin based on the Trojan Wars including a summary of the Aeneid and the Iliad. In his Ylias, Simon drew on Joseph of Exeter's work Frigii Daretis Yliados libri sex as well as Virgil's Aeneid. The largest version of this poem runs to 994 verses. Albert C. Friend has argued that Chaucer, in turn, relied on Simon's work along with the original version by Virgil for his own retelling of the Aeneid. Simon is also credited with the composition of a series of epitaphs dedicated to Saint Bernard.

== Bibliography ==
- Benton, John F. (1991). "The Court of Champagne as a Literary Center". In Bisson, Thomas N. (ed.). Culture, Power and Personality in Medieval France. Continuum. pp. 3–44. ISBN 978-1852850302. "The only author known to have written at Count Henry's request is Simon Chèvre d'Or (Capra Aurea), a canon of Saint-Victor of Paris. Simon composed a series of short poetic epitaphs for St Bernard"
- DiMarco, Vincent (2007). ""The Matter of Troy" and its transmission through translation in Medieval Europe". In Kittel, Harald; House, Juliane; Schultze, Brigitte (eds.). Ubersetzung - Translation - Traduction. Walter de Gruyter. pp. 1337–1374. ISBN 978-3110171457.
- Reichert, Michelle (2006). Between Courtly Literature and Al-Andaluz: Oriental Symbolism and Influences in the Romances of Chretien de Troyes. Routledge. ISBN 978-0415976152.
- Sundwall, McKay (1975). "Deiphobus and Helen: A Tantalizing Hint". Modern Philology. 73 (2). University of Chicago Press: 151–156. doi:10.1086/390633. JSTOR 436329. S2CID 161499451.
- Swanson, R.N. (1999). The Twelfth-Century Renaissance. Manchester University Press. ISBN 978-0719042560.
- Ziolkowski, Jan M. (1996). "Epic". In Mantello, Frank A. C.; Rigg, A. G. (eds.). Medieval Latin: An Introduction and Bibliographical Guide. Catholic University of America Press. pp. 537–555. ISBN 978-0813208428.
