= Champagne (province) =

Historical province in the Kingdom of France

Coordinates: 49°00′N 4°00′E

- Province of Kingdom of France
- 1314–1790
- Coat of arms

- History
  - Established: 1314
  - Disestablished: 1790
Preceded by
County of Champagne
Ecclesiastical Duchy of Reims
Ecclesiastical Duchy of Langres
Ecclesiastical Countship of Châlons
Succeeded by
Ardennes (department)
Marne (department)
Aube
Haute-Marne
Aisne (department)
Seine-et-Marne
Yonne
Meuse (department)

Champagne (French pronunciation: [ʃɑ̃paɲ]) was a province in the northeast of the Kingdom of France, now best known as the Champagne wine region for the sparkling white wine that bears its name in modern-day France. The County of Champagne arose in the early medieval Frankish kingdom of Austrasia. After the emergence of the Kingdom of France, it was ruled by the counts of Champagne until its direct annexation to the French royal domain in 1314.

The province's western edge is about 160 km (100 miles) east of Paris. The cities of Troyes, Reims, and Épernay are the commercial centers of the area. In 1956, most of Champagne became part of the French administrative region of Champagne-Ardenne, which comprised four departments: Ardennes, Aube, Haute-Marne, and Marne. From 1 January 2016, Champagne-Ardenne merged with the adjoining regions of Alsace and Lorraine to form the new region of Grand Est.

== Etymology ==
The name Champagne, formerly written Champaigne, comes from French meaning "open country" (suited to military maneuvers) and from Latin campanius meaning "level country" or "plain" which is also the derivation of the name of the Italian region of Campania. The toponym dates back to the Renaissance describing its vast chalk lined flat landscape.

== History ==
In the High Middle Ages, the province was famous for the Champagne fairs, which were very important in the economy of the Western societies. The chivalric romance had its first beginnings in the county of Champagne with the famous writer Chrétien de Troyes who wrote stories of the Round Table from the Arthurian legends.

A few counts of Champagne were French kings with the comital title merging with the French crown in 1314 when Louis I, king of Navarre and count of Champagne, became king of France as Louis X. Counts of Champagne were highly considered by the French aristocracy.

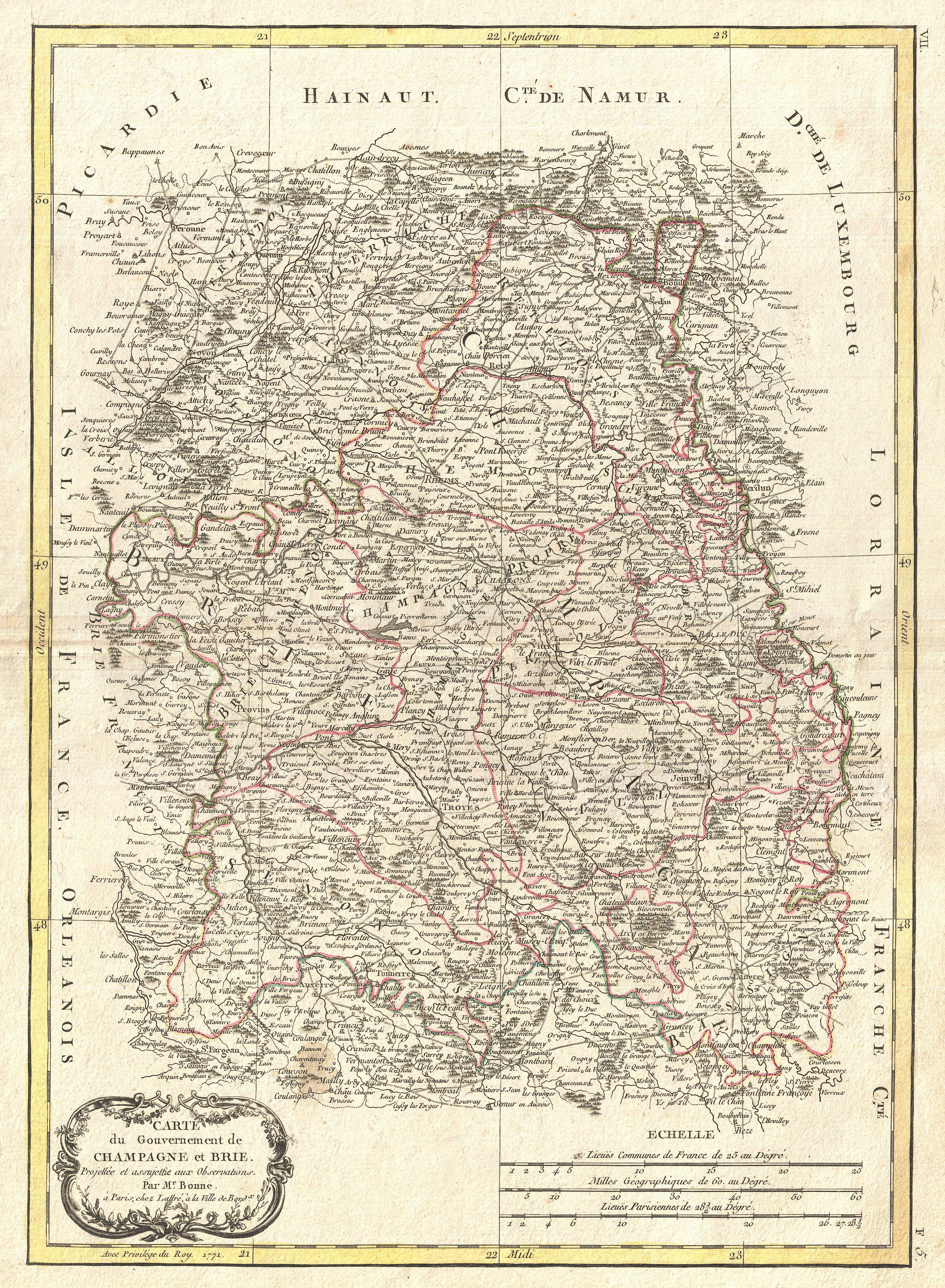
1771 map of Champagne and Brie by Rigobert Bonne
