= Stephen of Alinerre =

Student of Gilbert de la Porrée and canon of Beauvais

Stephen of Alinerre or Stephen of Beauvais was a student of Gilbert de la Porrée and canon of Beauvais. In 1148 he was present at the Synod of Reims at which Gilbert's work was condemned. Stephen worked at Reims as a teacher, and Walter of Châtillon was among his students there. Stephen became a courtier of Henry the Liberal, count of Champagne and from 1176 onwards was Henry's chancellor. He died in 1179.

Helinand of Froidmont describes a dispute with Stephen of Alinerre over the merits of Bernard of Clairvaux.
