= Gautier d'Arras =

Flemish or French trouvère

Gautier d'Arras (died c. 1185, Arras) was a Flemish or French trouvère.

He is called Galterus attrebatensis or Walterus de Altrebat in many contemporary Latin documents, the first of which dates from 1160, where he is mentioned as a property owner in Arras (Atrebatum in Latin). Gautier appears to have been a knight of Arras who between 1160 and 1170 held many important fiefs of St. Vaast's Abbey and between 1166 and 1185 was an official at the court of Count Philip I of Flanders. An apparent will is known dating from 1185, in which his wife Agnes and eldest son Roger are named.

He dedicated his romance of Eracle to Count Theobald V of Blois (d. 1191); among his other patrons were Countess Marie of Champagne and Count Baldwin IV of Hainaut.

Eracle, the hero of which becomes emperor of Constantinople as Heraclius, is purely a roman d'aventures and enjoyed great popularity. His second romance, Ille et Galeron, dedicated to Empress Beatrice, treats of a similar situation to that outlined in the lay of Eliduc by Marie de France.

See the Œuvres de Gautier d'Arras, ed. E Løseth (2 vols, Paris, 1890); Hist. litt. de la France, vol. xxii (1852); A Dinaux, Les Trouvères (1833–1843), vol. iii.
