= Rigobert Bonne =

French cartographer

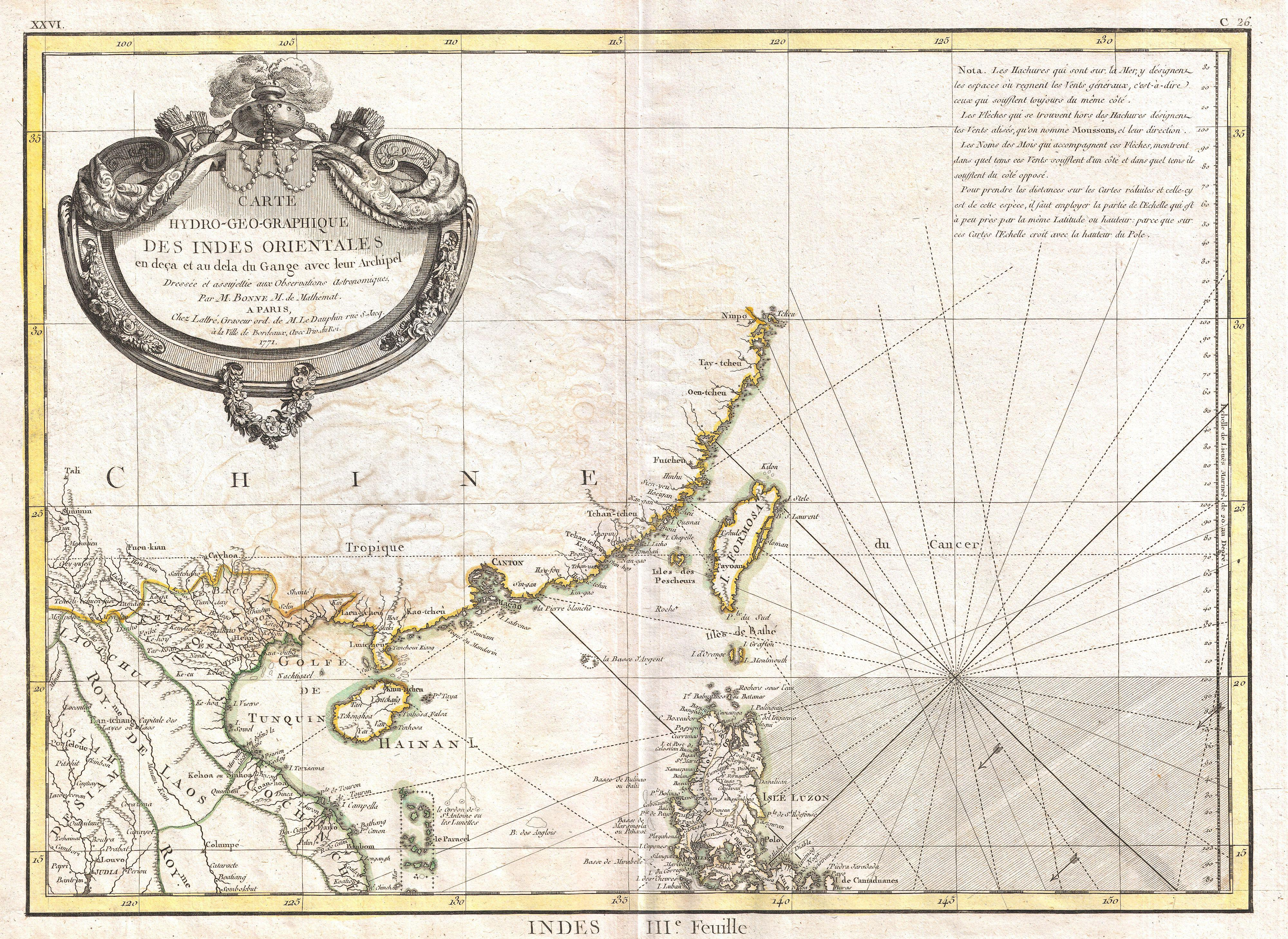
Carte hydro-geo-graphique des Indes Orientales en deca et au dela du Gange avec leur archipel, Paris 1771

Rigobert Bonne (6 October 1727 – 2 September 1794) was a French cartographer, widely considered to be one of the most important cartographers of the late 18th century.

In 1773 Bonne succeeded Jacques Nicolas Bellin as Royal Cartographer to France in the office of the Hydrographer at the Depôt de la Marine. Working in his official capacity, Bonne compiled some of the most detailed and accurate maps of the period. Bonne's work represents an important step in the evolution of the cartographic ideology away from the decorative work of the 17th and early 18th century towards a more detail oriented and practical aesthetic. With regard to the rendering of terrain Bonne maps bear many stylistic similarities to those of his predecessor, Bellin. However, Bonne maps generally abandon such common 18th century decorative features such as hand coloring, elaborate decorative cartouches, and compass roses.

While mostly focusing on coastal regions, the work of Bonne is highly regarded for its detail, historical importance, and overall aesthetic appeal.

== Principal works ==
- Maps for Guillaume Raynal's Atlas de toutes les parties connues du Globe Terrestre (Geneva, 1780)
- Maps for Atlas Encyclopedique ... (2 volumes, Paris, 1788)
