= Henry I of Champagne =

Count of Champagne from 1152 to 1181

Henry I
- Count of Champagne
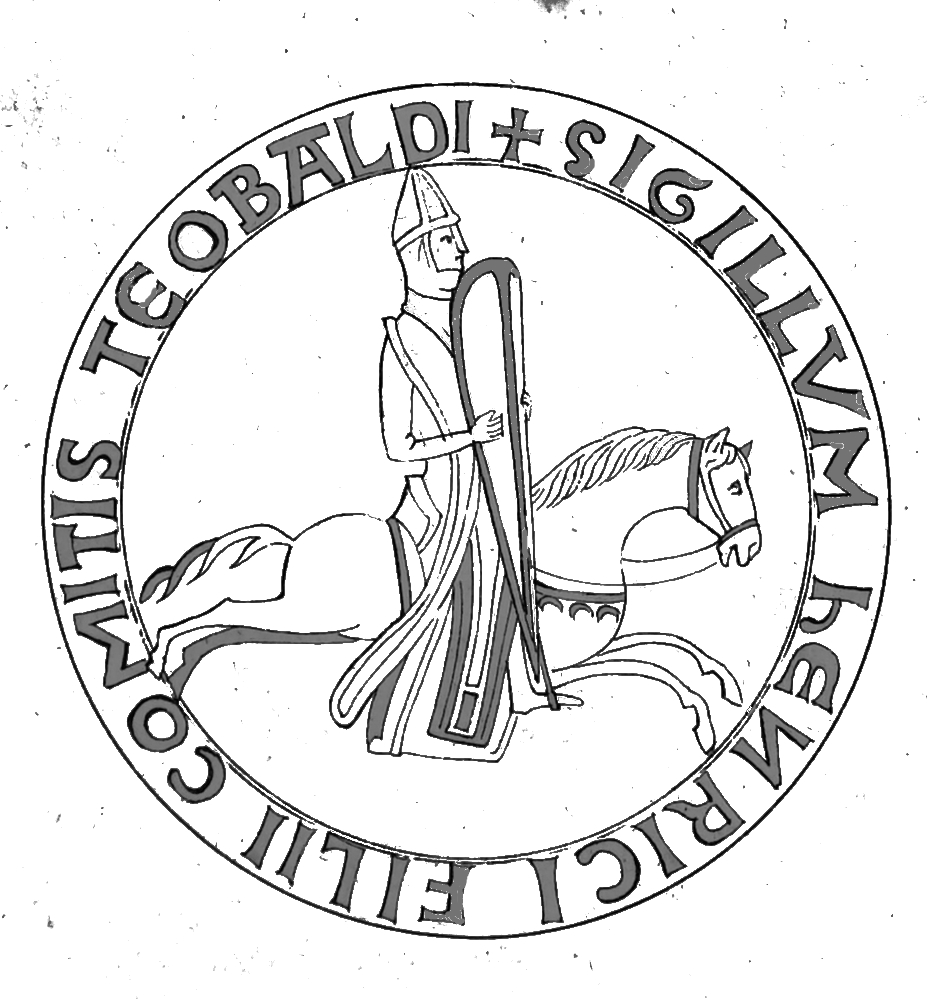
- Seal effigy
- Predecessor: Theobald IV
- Successor: Henry II
- Born: December 1127
- Died: 16 March 1181 (aged 53); Troyes
- Noble family: House of Blois; House of Blois-Champagne
- Spouse: Marie of France
- Issue: Henry I, King of Jerusalem; Marie, Latin Empress; Theobald III, Count of Champagne; Scholastique, Countess of Mâcon
- Father: Theobald II of Champagne
- Mother: Matilda of Carinthia

Henry I (December 1127 – 16 March 1181), known as the Liberal, was count of Champagne from 1152 to 1181. He was the eldest son of Count Theobald II of Champagne, who was also count of Blois, and Matilda of Carinthia.

== Biography ==
Henry took part in the Second Crusade under the leadership of Louis VII of France. He carried a letter of recommendation from Bernard of Clairvaux addressed to Manuel I Komnenos, Byzantine Emperor. He is listed among the notables present at the assembly held by Baldwin III of Jerusalem at Acre on 24 June 1148.

On his father's death, Henry chose to take Champagne, leaving the family's older holdings (including Blois, Chartres, Sancerre, and Châteaudun) to his younger brothers. At the time this may have been surprising, because the other territories were richer and better developed. Henry must have foreseen the economic possibilities of Champagne, and it is during his rule that the county achieved its high place as one of the richest and strongest of the French principalities.

Henry established orderly rule over the nobles of Champagne, and could fairly reliably count on the aid of some 2,000 vassals, which just by itself made him a power few in France could equal. This order in turn made Champagne a safe place for merchants to gather, and under the count's protection, the Champagne Fairs became a central part of long-distance trade and finance in medieval Europe.

In addition, the count's court in Troyes became a renowned literary center. Walter Map was among those who found hospitality there. The scholar Stephen of Alinerre was among Henry's courtiers, becoming chancellor of the county in 1176.

In 1179, Henry went to Jerusalem again, with a party of French knights including his relatives Peter of Courtenay (brother of Louis VII) and Philip of Dreux, bishop of Beauvais. He may have assisted to the wedding of his niece, Agnes, in Constantinople, as she wed Alexios Komnemos at the same date. Henry returned towards Europe by the land route across Asia Minor, and was captured and held to ransom by Kilij Arslan II, Seljuk sultan of Rüm. The ransom was paid by the Byzantine Emperor. Henry died on 16 March 1181.

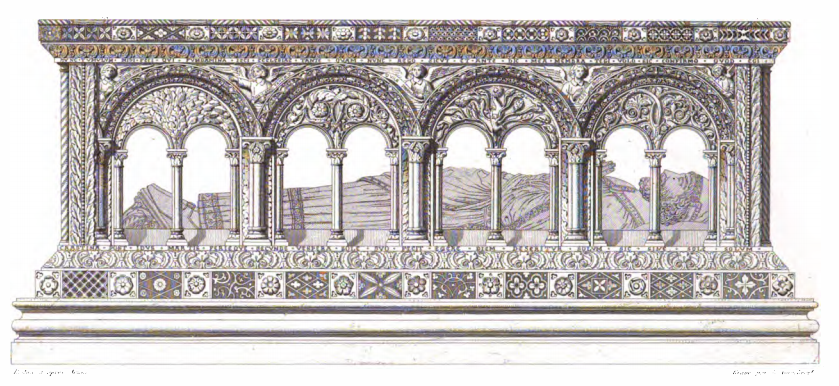
Henry's tomb in the church of Saint-Étienne (Troyes)

In 1164, Henry married Marie of France, daughter of Louis VII of France and Eleanor of Aquitaine.

They had four children:

- Scholastique of Champagne (died 1219), married William IV of Mâcon
- Henry II (1166–1197)
- Marie of Champagne (died 1204), married Baldwin I of Constantinople
- Theobald III of Champagne (1179–1201)

Henry built the collegiate church of Saint-Étienne in Troyes between 1157 and 1171, which he planned as a necropolis for the House of Blois. He was buried there, as was his son Theobald III, but most of his descendants were buried elsewhere.

He was succeeded by their elder son Henry.

== Sources ==
- Benton, John F. (October 1961). "The Court of Champagne as a Literary Center". Speculum. 36 (4).
- Berry, Virginia G. (1969). "The Second Crusade". In Setton, Kenneth M. (ed.). A History of the Crusades. Vol. I. The University of Wisconsin Press.
- Carriere, Maria (2021). Adele of Champagne: Politics, Government, and Patronage in Capetian France, 1180-1206 (Thesis). The University of Vermont.
- Cline, Ruth Harwood (July 2007). "Abbot Hugh: An Overlooked Brother of Henry I, Count of Champagne". The Catholic Historical Review. 93 (3).
- Evergates, Theodore, ed. (2003). Littere Baronum: The Earliest Cartulary of the Counts of Champagne. University of Toronto Press.
- Evergates, Theodore (2007). The Aristocracy in the County of Champagne, 1100-1300. University of Pennsylvania Press.
- Evergates, Theodore (2016). Henry the Liberal: Count of Champagne, 1127-1181. University of Pennsylvania Press.
- Hamilton, Bernard (2000). The Leper King and His Heirs: Baldwin IV and the Crusader Kingdom of Jerusalem. Cambridge University Press.

Henry I of Champagne House of Blois Born: December 1127 Died: 17 March 1181
Preceded by Theobald II	Count of Champagne; 1152–1181	Succeeded by Henry II
