= John F. Benton =

American historian (1931–1988)

John Frederick Benton
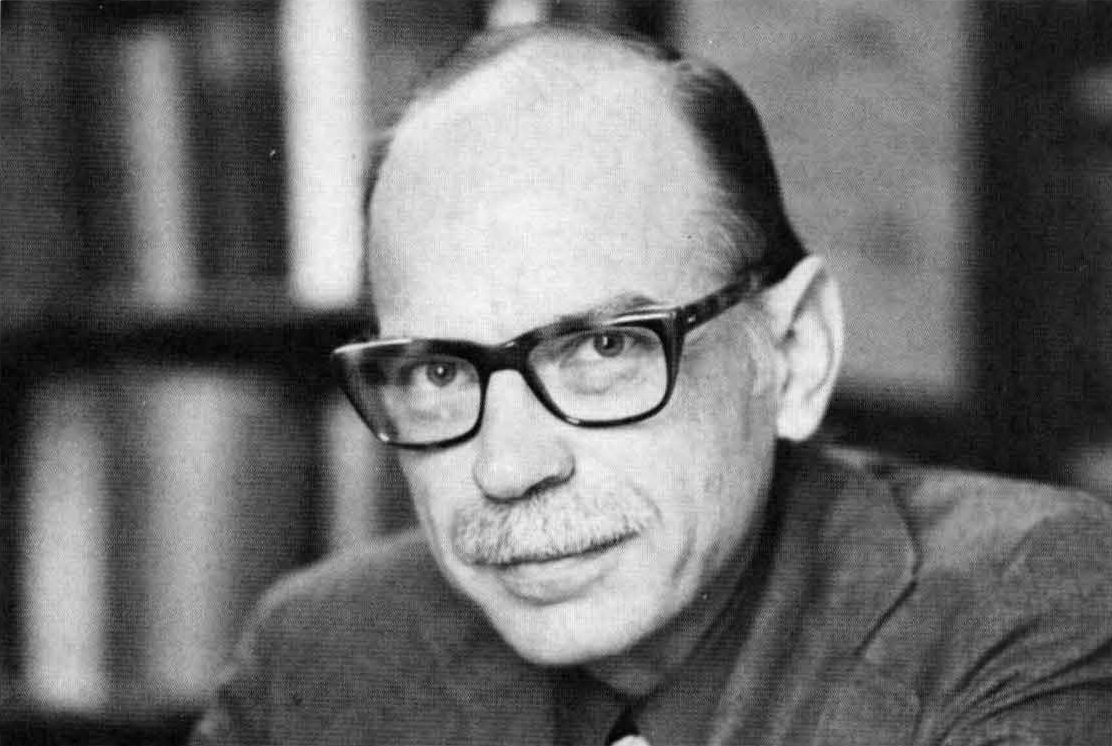
- Benton in 1988
- Born: July 15, 1931; Philadelphia, Pennsylvania, U.S.
- Died: February 25, 1988 (aged 56); Pasadena, California, U.S.
- Education: Haverford College (BA); Princeton University (MA, PhD)
- Occupation: Historian

John Frederick Benton (July 15, 1931 Philadelphia – February 25, 1988 Pasadena) was an American medieval historian, the Doris and Henry Dreyfuss Professor of History at the California Institute of Technology.

== Education ==
He graduated from Haverford College, with a B.A. in 1953, from Princeton University with an M.A. in 1955, and a Ph.D. in 1959. He taught at Reed College and the University of Pennsylvania before joining the Caltech faculty in 1965.

== Awards ==
- 1985 MacArthur Fellows Program

== Works ==
- Self and society in medieval France: 1064? - c. 1125, Guibert of Nogent, Ed. John F. Benton: Translator C. C. Swinton Bland, Harper & Row, 1970
