= Marie of Champagne =

Latin empress in 1204

Latin Empress consort of Constantinople
- Tenure: 9 May 1204 – 29 August 1204
- Born: c. 1174
- Died: 29 August 1204 (aged 29–30); Acre, Kingdom of Jerusalem
- Spouse: Baldwin I, Latin Emperor (m. 1186)
- Issue: Joan, Countess of Flanders; Margaret II, Countess of Flanders
- House: House of Blois; House of Blois-Champagne
- Father: Henry I, Count of Champagne
- Mother: Marie of France

Marie of Champagne (c. 1174 – 29 August 1204 was the first Latin empress of Constantinople by marriage to Emperor Baldwin I. She acted as regent of Flanders during the absence of her husband from 1202 until 1204.

== Life ==
Marie was a daughter of Henry I, Count of Champagne, and Marie, daughter of King Louis VII of France and Eleanor of Aquitaine.

According to the chronicle of Gislebert of Mons, on 13 May 1179 Marie was officially bethrothed to Baldwin, son of the count of Flanders and Hainaut, to whom she was already promised to be wed in 1171. Her betrothed was Baldwin VI, son of Baldwin V, Count of Hainaut and Margaret I, Countess of Flanders.

=== Countess of Flanders ===
On 6 January 1186, Marie and Baldwin were married at Valenciennes.

The young countess consort issued charters in her own name and seems to have a soft spot for the cities in Flanders. In 1200 she and her husband also released the Ninove and Bohéries Abbey from every toll on their territory.

In 1200, she and her husband took the cross in Bruges. On 14 April 1202 her husband left Flanders to join the Fourth Crusade. During her husband's absence, Marie acted as regent for Flanders for two years.

Marie herself left Flanders to join her husband in Outremer. According to Geoffrey of Villehardouin and other authors she could not join him in the crusade earlier as she was pregnant at the time of his departure. After delivery of the child, Margaret and sufficient recovery, she set forth to join him.

=== Latin Empress ===
Her husband's Crusade was diverted to Constantinople, capital of the Roman Empire, where the crusaders captured and sacked the city. Then the Crusaders and Venetian established the Latin Empire of Romaniae in place of the fallen one. On 9 May 1204, Baldwin was elected its first Emperor, making Marie the Empress.

She set sail from the port of Marseille and landed in Acre. It was only when she arrived in Outremer that the news reached her of the fall of Constantinople and the election of Baldwin as the new Emperor of the East. There as an Empress of Constantinople she received the homage of the Prince Bohemond IV of Antioch. She wanted to set sail for Constantinople but fell sick and died in the Holy Land.

News of her death reached Constantinople through Crusading reinforcements from Syria. Baldwin was reportedly afflicted by the death of his wife. Villehardouin reports that Marie "was a gracious and virtuous lady and greatly honoured".

== Children ==
They had two known children:

- Joan, Countess of Flanders (1199/1200 – 5 December 1244).
- Margaret II, Countess of Flanders (2 June 1202 – 10 February 1280).

== Historical sources ==
- Alberic of Trois-Fontaines, Chronica Alberici Monachi Trium Fontium.
- Gislebert of Mons, Chronicon Hanoniense (Chronicle of Hainaut).
- Geoffrey of Villehardouin, De la Conquête de Constantinople

Marie of Champagne House of Champagne Born: c. 1174 Died: 29 August 1204
Royal titles
New title Latin Empire established	Latin Empress consort of Constantinople; 1204	Vacant Title next held by Agnes of Montferrat
