= Champagne fairs =

Medieval trade fairs in France

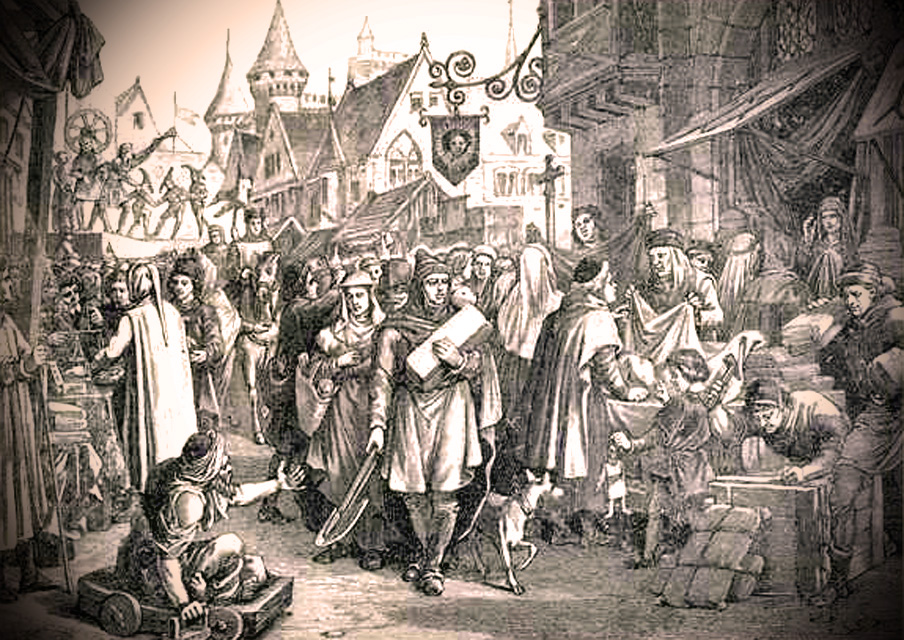
Une foire en Champagne au XIII^{e} siècle (A fair in Champagne in the 13th century), engraving in Album historique, publié sous la direction de M. Ernest Lavisse (1898), Paris, Armand Colin & Cie

The Champagne fairs were an annual cycle of trade fairs which flourished in different towns of the County of Champagne in Northeastern France in the 12th and 13th centuries, originating in local agricultural and stock fairs. Each fair lasted about two to three weeks. The Champagne fairs, sited on ancient land routes and largely self-regulated through the development of the Lex mercatoria ("merchant law"), became an important engine in the reviving economic history of medieval Europe, "veritable nerve centers" serving as a premier market for textiles, leather, fur, and spices. At their height, in the late 12th and the 13th century, the fairs linked the cloth-producing cities of the Low Countries with the Italian dyeing and exporting centers, with Genoa in the lead, dominating the commercial and banking relations operating at the frontier region between the north and the Mediterranean. The Champagne fairs were one of the earliest manifestations of a linked European economy, a characteristic of the High Middle Ages.

== The towns ==
Map of France in 1154

The towns in which the six fairs of the annual circuit were held had some features in common, but none that would have inexorably drawn the commerce of the fairs: each was situated at an intersection or former way-station of Roman roads and near a river, but only Lagny-sur-Marne had a navigable one. Troyes and Provins had been administrative centers in Charlemagne's empire that developed into the central towns of the County of Champagne and the Brie Champenoise; the fair at Bar-sur-Aube was held just outside the precincts of the Count's castle there, and that at Lagny in the grounds of a Benedictine monastery. The self-interest and the political will of the counts of Champagne was the overriding factor.

== Organization ==
The series of six fairs, each lasting more than six weeks, were spaced through the year's calendar: the fair of Lagny-sur-Marne began on 2 January: the fair at Bar-sur-Aube on the Tuesday before mid-Lent; the "May fair" of Provins on the Tuesday before Ascension; the "fair of St. John" or the "hot fair" of Troyes on the first Tuesday after the fortnight of St. John's Day (24 June); the fair of St. Ayoul of Provins on the Exaltation of the Cross (14 September); the "fair of St. Remi" or the "cold fair" of Troyes on the day following All Saints' Day (that is, on 2 November). Each fair began with the entrée of eight days during which merchants set up, followed by the days allotted for the cloth fair, the days of the leather fair, and the days for the sale of spices and other things sold by weight (avoirdupois). In the last four-day period of the fairs, accounts were settled.

In actual practice, arrivals and departures were more flexible and efficient, relying on flexibly formed and dissolved partnerships, which freed the "silent" partners from actually undertaking the arduous journey on each occasion, delegated agents (certi missi) who could receive payment and undertake contracts, and factors, integrated with communications and transportation, and the extensive use of credit instruments in the trade.

The towns provided huge warehouses, still to be seen at Provins. Furs and skins traveled in both directions, from Spain, Sicily, and North Africa in the south via Marseille, and the highly prized vair, rabbit, marten and other skins from the north. From the north also came woolens and linen cloth. From the south came silk, pepper and other spices, drugs, coinage and the new concepts of credit and bookkeeping. Goods converged from Spain, travelling along the well-established pilgrim route from Santiago de Compostela and from Germany. Once the cloth sales had been concluded, the reckoning of credit at the tables (banche) of Italian money-changers effected compensatory payments for goods, established future payments on credit, made loans to princes and lords, and settled bills of exchange (which were generally worded to expire at one of the Champagne fairs). Even after trade routes had shifted away from the north-south axis that depended on the Champagne commodities fairs, the fairs continued to function as an international clearing house for paper debts and credits, as they had built up a system of commercial law, regulated by private judges separate from the feudal social order and the requirements of scrupulously maintaining a "good name", prior to the third-party enforcement of legal codes by the nation-state.

== Reaching the Champagne fairs ==
To cross the Alps, the caravans of pack mules made their way over the Mont Cenis Pass, a journey that took more than a month from Genoa to the fair cities, along one of the varied options of the Via Francigena. Professional freight-handlers sometimes made the trek while under contract to merchants. P. Huvelin documented the existence, by the second half of the thirteenth century, of a faster courier service that facilitated the transfer of letters and market information between north and south for the particular advantage of the Arte di Calimala, the cloth-merchants' guild of Florence, the cities of Siena and Genoa, as well as the mercantile houses. R. D. Face noted that in early February, 1290, it took a courier no more than twenty days to make the journey from Lagny to Florence. Alternatively, north Italian goods were shipped to Aigues-Mortes then up or along the Rhone, Saône and Seine.

== Dominance and decline ==
The fairs were also important in the spread and exchange of cultural influences—the first appearance of Gothic architecture in Italy was the result of merchants from Siena rebuilding their houses in the Northern style. The phrase "not to know your Champagne fairs" meant not knowing what everyone else did.

It was in the interest of the Count of Champagne, virtually independent of his nominal suzerain, the King of France, to extend the liberties and prerogatives of the towns, which were founded in the increased security of the feudal settlement following the feudal disorders of the tenth century. The predominance of the Champagne fairs over those of other cities has been attributed to the personal role of the Counts in guaranteeing the security and property rights of merchants and trading organisations attending the fairs, and in ensuring that contracts signed at the fairs would be honoured throughout Western Christendom. The Counts provided the fairs with a police force, the "Guards of the Fair", who heard complaints and enforced contracts, excluding defaulters from future participation; weights and measures were strictly regulated. Historian Jean Favier has written "the success of the Champagne fairs can be attributed solely to this intelligent policy of applying public order to business." The Counts' concern for protection of this profitable trade extended beyond their borders: Thibaut II negotiated a treaty in which the kings of France pledged themselves to take under royal protection all merchants passing through royal territory on their way to and from the Champagne fairs. Eventually even the king became involved; in 1209 Philip Augustus granted safe conduct within France to merchants traveling to and from the Champagne fairs, increasing their international importance.

Traditional historians have dated the decline of the Champagne fairs to the subordination of Champagne to the Royal Domain brought about by the marriage alliance of Philip the Fair in 1284. In 1285 Champagne became an integral part of France. "When the special motivation was removed in 1285", Janet Abu-Lughod observes, "the Champagne fairs lost their edge." The effect of the Little Ice Age and population-diminishing black plague took a toll also. Around the same time, a series of wars in Italy, most significantly the conflicts between the Guelphs and Ghibellines, disrupted the overland trade routes that connected the Italian cities with France, and Genoese and Venetian merchants opened up direct sea trade with Flanders, diminishing the importance of the fairs. Fernand Braudel also saw the decline as due to the increasing sophistication of communications and distance credit, changing the medieval merchant from a person engaged in constant arduous travel to one who mostly controlled his affairs by correspondence.

Table 1. Total yield of the taxes levied at the Champagne fairs, c. 1275–1341 (in livres tournois).

| Date | St Jean (‘hot’) fair in Troyes | St Remy (‘cold’) fair in Troyes | St Ayoul fair in Provins | May fair in Provins | Fair of Lagny-sur-Marne | Fair of Bar-sur-Aube | Total for five fairsa |
|---|---|---|---|---|---|---|---|
| 1212 | – | – | – | – | – | 1000 | – |
| c. 1275 | 1300 | 700 | 1000b | 800 | – | 2000 | 5800 |
| 1285 | – | – | – | 810 | – | 1680 | – |
| 1287 | 800c | 550 | 925 | – | – | – | – |
| 1288 | 790 | 480 | – | 990 | – | – | – |
| 1296d | 1376 | 1386e | 1554 | 1926f | 1814 | 2141g | 8383 |
| 1298–9 | 760 | 620 | 100 | 640 | – | 1200 | 3320 |
| c. 1310 | 300 | 60 | 450h | 250 | – | 700 | 1760 |
| 1320 | 250 | 290 | – | 218i | – | – | – |
| 1323 | – | – | – | – | – | 705 | – |
| 1340–1 | 180j | 177k | 155 | –l | 360 | 280m | 1152 |
| unspecified date before tax innovations of 1292–6n | 800–900 | 160 | 1000–1100 | 800–900 | – | 1600–1800 | 4360–4860 |

The above table shows a spike in tax yields in 1296 followed by an immediate decline, providing useful data on when the faires began to decline. Edwards offers an explanation for the decline of the faires. "Philip IV was ambitious to centralize the French monarchy and expand its military and fiscal capacities. The tactics he used– war with Flanders, despoiling and excluding Flemish merchants, arresting and taxing Italian merchants, and barring exports of raw wool and undyed cloth from France– all affected trade at the Champagne fairs within 15 years of their coming under French governance. Conflicts between France and Flanders restricted the ability of Flemish merchants to attend the fairs, confiscatory taxation and incarceration encumbered and deterred Italian merchants from operating in France, and prohibitions on the export of wool and woolen cloth reduced the attractiveness of the fairs to all."

As the Champagne fairs dwindled to insignificance, their place was assumed by the fairs of Bruges, to which the Genoese ships sailed, Cologne, a Hansa town, Frankfurt-am-Main, Geneva and, more locally, Lyon.
