= 1266 =

1266 in various calendars
- Gregorian calendar: 1266; MCCLXVI
- Ab urbe condita: 2019
- Armenian calendar: 715; ԹՎ ՉԺԵ
- Assyrian calendar: 6016
- Balinese saka calendar: 1187–1188
- Bengali calendar: 672–673
- Berber calendar: 2216
- English Regnal year: 50 Hen. 3 – 51 Hen. 3
- Buddhist calendar: 1810
- Burmese calendar: 628
- Byzantine calendar: 6774–6775
- Chinese calendar: 乙丑年 (Wood Ox); 3963 or 3756 — to — 丙寅年 (Fire Tiger); 3964 or 3757
- Coptic calendar: 982–983
- Discordian calendar: 2432
- Ethiopian calendar: 1258–1259
- Hebrew calendar: 5026–5027
- Hindu calendars
- Vikram Samvat: 1322–1323
- Shaka Samvat: 1187–1188
- Kali Yuga: 4366–4367
- Holocene calendar: 11266
- Igbo calendar: 266–267
- Iranian calendar: 644–645
- Islamic calendar: 664–665
- Japanese calendar: Bun'ei 3 (文永３年)
- Javanese calendar: 1176–1177
- Julian calendar: 1266; MCCLXVI
- Korean calendar: 3599
- Minguo calendar: 646 before ROC 民前646年
- Nanakshahi calendar: −202
- Thai solar calendar: 1808–1809
- Tibetan calendar: ཤིང་མོ་གླང་ལོ་ (female Wood-Ox); 1392 or 1011 or 239 — to — མེ་ཕོ་སྟག་ལོ་ (male Fire-Tiger); 1393 or 1012 or 240

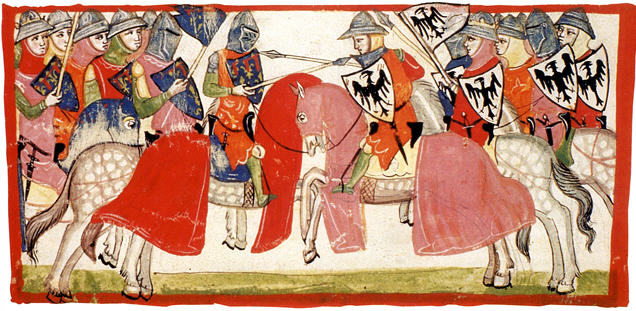
Charles of Anjou (left) defeats Manfred of Sicily at the Battle of Benevento.

Year 1266 (MCCLXVI) was a common year starting on Friday of the Julian calendar.

== Events ==
=== By place ===
==== Europe ====
- January 2 – Siege of Murcia: King James I of Aragon ("the Conqueror") marches with his army from Orihuela and lays siege at Murcia on the Segura River. Skirmishes break out between the defenders and the Aragonese forces. The Muslim garrison, realizing that they are outnumbered and cut off from reinforcements, asks for terms. James offers to ask King Alfonso X of Castile ("the Wise") to restore the Murcians' legal rights (see 1244) from before the rebellion: self-government under Castilian suzerainty, freedom of worship, and preservation of lands and properties. They agree to this offer but request Alfonso's explicit agreement rather than just James' promise to ask him. James refuses to get Alfonso's agreement before the city surrenders. Finally, the Moors yield Murcia to James on January 31. Seeing his standard on the walls, James enters the city on February 3, accepting its surrender.
- February 26 – Battle of Benevento: Guelph forces (some 12,000 men), led by Charles of Anjou, brother of King Louis IX of France, defeat a combined German and Sicilian army under King Manfred of Sicily, during a long-running power struggle in Italy. Manfred takes up a strong position near Benevento. As the French infantry advances, he unleashes his Saracen archers and light cavalry, which scatters the French. But the Saracens leave themselves exposed to the French heavy cavalry, and are overwhelmed. Manfred orders his heavy cavalry (some 1,200 German mercenary knights) into the attack, but they are defeated by the Guelph forces, and take heavy losses. Manfred is killed, and Pope Clement IV invests Charles as ruler of Sicily and Naples. Meanwhile, Michael II, despot of Epirus, invades Albania, and recovers the lands that Manfred has taken from him.
- June – The Mudéjar revolt of 1264–1266 ends. The rebels make their formal submission to Alfonso X. They recognize the error that the Moors of Murcia have committed against their overlord Alfonso. Representatives of the aljama, or municipal council, renew their allegiance and humbly beg for pardon, mercy and favour. With this, the Mudéjar uprising in the Kingdom of Murcia is formally ended.
- June 23 – Battle of Trapani: The Venetian fleet (24 galleys) led by Admiral Jacopo Dondulo moves to Marsala and attacks the larger Genoese fleet anchored at Trapani, capturing all its ships. Some 1,200 Genoese drown and many are killed. Dondulo is acclaimed a hero on his return to Venice in July and elected as Captain General of the Sea, Venice's highest naval command position.
- July 2 – Treaty of Perth: King Alexander III of Scotland agrees to a peace settlement with King Magnus VI of Norway ("the Law-mender") in which the Outer Hebrides and Isle of Man are ceded to Scotland in exchange for 4,000 marks. In return, Alexander confirms Norwegian sovereignty over the islands of Shetland and Orkney.

==== England ====
- May 15 – Second Barons' War: Battle of Chesterfield: English forces led by Henry of Almain, son of Richard of Cornwall, defeat rebels under Robert de Ferrers in a minor skirmish at Chesterfield. Robert is taken as a prisoner to London, and at the Parliament of England disinherits. In July, he is forced to surrender land and Liverpool Castle to Edmund Crouchback, second son of King Henry III of England.
- October 31 – Dictum of Kenilworth provides terms of peace in the Second Barons' War between supporters of the slain rebel leader Simon de Montfort and Henry III.
- December 13 – Siege of Kenilworth: English forces under Henry III capture Kenilworth Castle from remaining rebels in the Second Barons' War after a 6-month siege. During the siege Archbishop William Freney tries to negotiate with the garrison but is refused entry.

==== Levant ====
- July 23 – Siege of Safed: Mamluk forces capture the castle of Safed, defended by a garrison of 1,700 men (including some 500 Knights Templar), after a 6-week siege. Sultan Baibars promises safe conduct but when the Christians and Templars are on their way towards Acre, they are seized and beheaded.
- August 24 – Battle of Mari: Mamluk forces (some 30,000 men) led by Baibars defeat the Armenian army in Cilicia, in retaliation for the support of the Mongol invasion in Syria. He expands his domain, capturing the city of Byblos (modern Lebanon) and the important castle of Toron from the Crusader States.
- October 28 – A Crusader advance guard is ambushed by the Egyptian garrison of Safed, while local Arabs attack the Crusader camp. The 13-year-old Hugh II, ruler of Cyprus, is advised to retire and withdraw with heavy losses. Meanwhile, Baibars campaigns in Galilee and leads a lightning raid to Tripoli.

==== Asia ====
- Niccolo and Maffeo Polo, father and uncle of Marco Polo, reach the Mongol capital Khanbaliq (modern-day Beijing), setting the stage for Marco's famous expedition 5 years later. Kublai Khan sends the Polos back with a message, requesting that Pope Clement IV dispatch western scholars to teach in the Mongol Empire; however, this request is largely ignored.

==== America ====
- In the modern-day United States, a period of drought (up until 1299) begins in the Four Corners Region, putting an end to the ancient Puebloans Civilization.

=== By topic ===
==== Economics ====
- In France, the gold écu (or crown) and silver grosh coins are minted for the first time during the reign of Louis IX.

==== Religion ====
- Ode de Pougy, French Abbess of Notre Dame aux Nonnains, sends a gang to attempt to destroy the nearby part-completed Église Saint-Urbain, Troyes.

== Births ==
- Duns Scotus, Scottish priest and philosopher (d. 1308)
- Ki Cha-o, Korean nobleman (d. 1328)
- Gilbert Segrave, English nobleman and bishop (d. 1316)
- Herman VII, Margrave of Baden-Baden ("the Rouser"), German nobleman (d. 1291)
- Hethum II, king of Cilician Armenia (assassinated 1307)
- Jadwiga of Kalisz, queen consort of Poland (d. 1339)
- John of Brittany, English courtier, nobleman and knight (d. 1334)
- Margaret of Villehardouin, princess of Achaea (d. 1315)
- Alauddin Khalji, Sultan of Delhi (d. 1316)
- Ravivarman Kulaśēkhara, Indian ruler of Venad (d. 1317)
- Rigdzin Kumaradza, Tibetan Dzogchen master (d. 1343)

== Deaths ==
- January 2 – Simon de Walton, English cleric and bishop
- January 11 – Swietopelk II, Duke of Pomerania ("the Great"), Polish nobleman
- February 12 – Walter de Cantilupe, English bishop (b. 1195)
- February 26
  - Manfred, King of Sicily, illegitimate son of Frederick II, Holy Roman Emperor (b. 1232)
  - Richard of Lauria, Italian nobleman and condottiere
- March – Margaret de Quincy, Countess of Lincoln, English noblewoman and heiress
- April 14 – Roger of Torre Maggiore, Italian archbishop
- April 23 – Gilles of Saumur, French cleric and archbishop of Tyre
- May 7 – Fariduddin Ganjshakar, Ghurid preacher (b. 1179)
- May 27 – Elisabeth of Brunswick-Lüneburg, queen consort of the Romans, Countess of Holland and Countess of Zeeland (b. 1230)
- June 12 – Henry II, Prince of Anhalt-Aschersleben, German nobleman (b. 1215)
- July 24 – Albrecht II of Meissen, German canon and bishop
- August 4 – Odo, Count of Nevers (Odo or Eudes of Burgundy), French nobleman
- August 8 – Sayyed Ibn Tawus, Abbasid theologian (b. 1193)
- September 20 – Jan Prandota, bishop of Kraków (b. 1200)
- October 21 – Birger Jarl, Swedish nobleman and knight (b. 1210)
- October 28 – Arsenije Sremac, Serbian disciple and archbishop
- October 29 – Margaret of Austria, queen consort of Germany and later of Bohemia (b. 1204)
- November 19 – Nasiruddin Mahmud Shah, Mamluk ruler of Delhi
- December 3 – Henry III the White), duke of Silesia-Wrocław
- December – John of Ibelin ("John of Jaffa"), Outremer nobleman, crusader knight and legal writer (b. 1215)
- Aldonza Alfonso de León, illegitimate daughter of Alfonso IX
- Andronikos II (Megas Komnenos), emperor of Trebizond
- Ariq Böke (or Bukha), Mongol ruler (khagan) and regent
- Berke Khan, Mongol ruler of the Golden Horde (b. 1208)
- Chen Rong, Chinese painter, poet and politician (b. 1200)
- Hugh Bigod, English nobleman and chief justiciar (b. 1211)
- Hugh, Count of Burgundy (Hugh III of Châlon), French nobleman and knight (b. 1220)
- Luca Savelli, Italian senator and politician (b. 1190)
- Máel Coluim II, Mormaer of Fife (Malcolm II, Earl of Fife), Scottish nobleman
- Mu'ayyad al-Din al-Urdi, Syrian scholar and astronomer
- Philippe Chinard, French nobleman and admiral, murdered (b. 1205)
- Richer of Senones, French monk and chronicler (b. 1190)
