= Collegiate Church of Saint-Étienne (Troyes) =

Collégiale Saint-Étienne
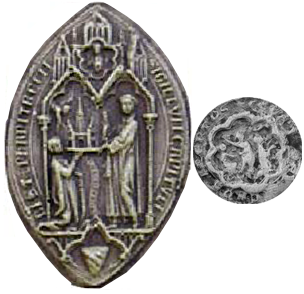
- Henry I (kneeling) offers the collegiate church to Saint Stephen

- Location within France
- 48.298451°N 4.081588°E
- Location: Troyes, Aube
- Country: France
- Denomination: Catholic

History
- Status: Demolished

Architecture
- Style: Gothic
- Years built: 1157–72
- Demolished: 1792

The Collegiate Church of Saint-Étienne or Collégiale Saint-Étienne was a collegiate church dedicated to Saint Stephen founded in Troyes, France, in 1157 by Count Henry I of Champagne. He intended it to become a mausoleum in which the grandeur of the House of Blois would be displayed, but that did not happen. The church was demolished during the French Revolution.

== Foundation ==
The main palace of the counts of Champagne was located on a site in Troyes that is now the basin of the canal. It had a small chapel of Saint Andrew served by two chaplains. In 1157, Count Henry I of Champagne (1127–81), known as Henry the Liberal, founded a large and splendid church dedicated to Saint Stephen (Saint Étienne) to replace the chapel. Henry may have placed the college under Saint Stephen in memory of his uncle, Stephen of Blois, who ruled in England in 1135–54. The college and the many houses of the canons were located in the district of Troyes that today is called "Cloître-Saint-Etienne". The founding charter provided for nine dignitaries and 72 canons, making it one of the most important chapters in France. The nine dignitaries were the dean, sub-dean, provost, cantor, sub-cantor, treasurer, building manager, headmaster and steward.

== Endowment ==
Saint-Étienne was endowed with large revenues, many relics and rich treasure. In the town of Troyes the chapter owned a dozen houses, toll rights, taxes on the sale of local products and the income from the Fair of the Clos, which was held for two weeks in January. Outside the town the chapter owned land, men, mills, ovens and tithes in five locations. In 1173 Henry I enlarged the endowment to twice as many houses and the tithes of ten villages. At the fairs the chapter earned taxes from the sales of dyed cloth, wax, salt, pepper and salted fish.

The college possessed many valuable objects including a gold table with bas-reliefs decorated with diamonds that was used as an altar in the most solemn ceremonies. It was later taken by Robert de Fiennes (1308–85), Constable of France, as part of the ransom of King John II of France (1319–64). There was also a large gold cross decorated with enamels and gems that was displayed at the main fairs. King Charles V of France, when he visited Troyes in 1367, was struck by the beauty of this cross and expressed the desire to own it. Two members of the chapter were charged with offering him this precious object, which became part of the treasure of the Sainte-Chapelle in Paris.

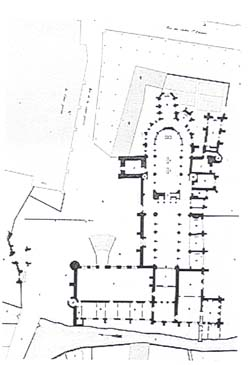
Plan of the church (above) extending from the palace (below)

== History ==
The dignitaries of the chapter always belonged to the leading families of Champagne. The church served the parish of Saint-Pierre in the Diocese of Troyes within the ecclesiastical province of Sens. Henry I used the church as his chancery, treasury and library, and tried to claim that as his private chapel it did not fall within the jurisdiction of the bishop of Troyes. In 1171–72 there was a conflict between Henry and Mathieu, Bishop of Troyes, in which Henry failed to secure total independence. In 1177 King Louis VII of France took the opportunity to intervene in the affairs of the Bishop of Troyes by granting a diploma that confirmed his property. Manassès II de Pougy, Bishop of Troyes from 1181 to 1190, is probably the same as Manassès de Pougy, provost of Saint-Etienne.

The counts could benefit from the wealth of the chapter. On 15 May 1223, Theobald IV acknowledged receipt from Saint-Etienne of a golden altar table and a large golden cross to serve as security for a loan from the abbey of Saint-Denis. The bishops gradually took power over the collegiate from the counts, confirmed in the charter of 1230. However, the canons remained close to the counts. In the 13th century the chapter maintained the count's administrative records, including the register of his fiefs.

A scandal developed in 1266–68 when Ode de Pougy, abbess of Notre Dame aux Nonnains, tried to prevent the construction of the Church of St Urbain, Troyes. When the pope heard of events he launched an investigation by the archdeacon of Luxeuil and the dean of Saint-Étienne de Troyes. In March 1269 the pope excommunicated the abbess and several associates who had assisted her.

Around 1300 an estimate of annual revenues of 3,619 livres was given to King Philip IV of France (Philip the Fair). Saint-Étienne became a royal college on the death of Queen Joan I of Navarre on 2 April 1305.

During the French Revolution the chapter was suppressed in 1790 and the college was demolished in 1792. The stained glass from the church was scattered, and is now held in various private and public collections. The fragments are stylistically linked to the Mosan enamels and show a transition from the Romanesque to Gothic styles.

== Structure ==
Work on the church began in 1157 and was completed around 1171–72. The church may have been designed by the famous Master André and modeled on the Sens Cathedral. If so it was one of the first Gothic buildings in southern Champagne. It was built in the grounds of the count's palace, oriented at right angles to it. It communicated directly with the count's apartments through a tribune at the entrance to the nave, which was lined with aisles. The apse had an ambulatory but only one chapel, on the axis. The building was three levels high. It lacked a transept, but was flanked by two projecting towers. Nothing survives of the church apart from a very beautiful capital preserved in the Musée des beaux-arts de Troyes.

The church was intended by Henry I to be the necropolis of the house of Champagne and a monument to its glory. His wife, Marie of Champagne (c. 1174–1204), arranged for a magnificent tomb for Henry I to be placed in the church. Henry's tomb was described in detail by the Saint-Étienne canon Jean Hugot in 1704, and may be seen in two engravings from a drawing made before the revolution. The tomb of his son, Theobald III (1179–1201), was placed on a shared plinth in line with Henry's nearer the altar. Both tombs were moved from Saint-Etienne to Troyes Cathedral, then destroyed in 1793. The church had statues of Marie of France, Countess of Champagne (1145–98) and Scholastique of Champagne (1172–1219). However, Saint-Étienne did not become the necropolis that Henry had planned. Marie of Champagne was entombed in Meaux Cathedral. Henry II (1166–97) was entombed in Sainte-Croix de Saint-Jean d'Acre. Blanche of Navarre (died 1229) was laid to rest in Argensolles Abbey. Other descendants were buried in Pamplona, Provins and Clairvaux Abbey.

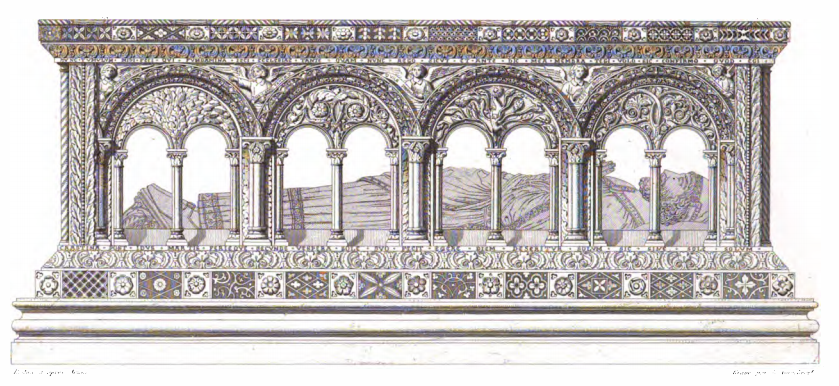
Tomb of Henry I

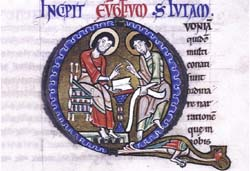
Bible from the church

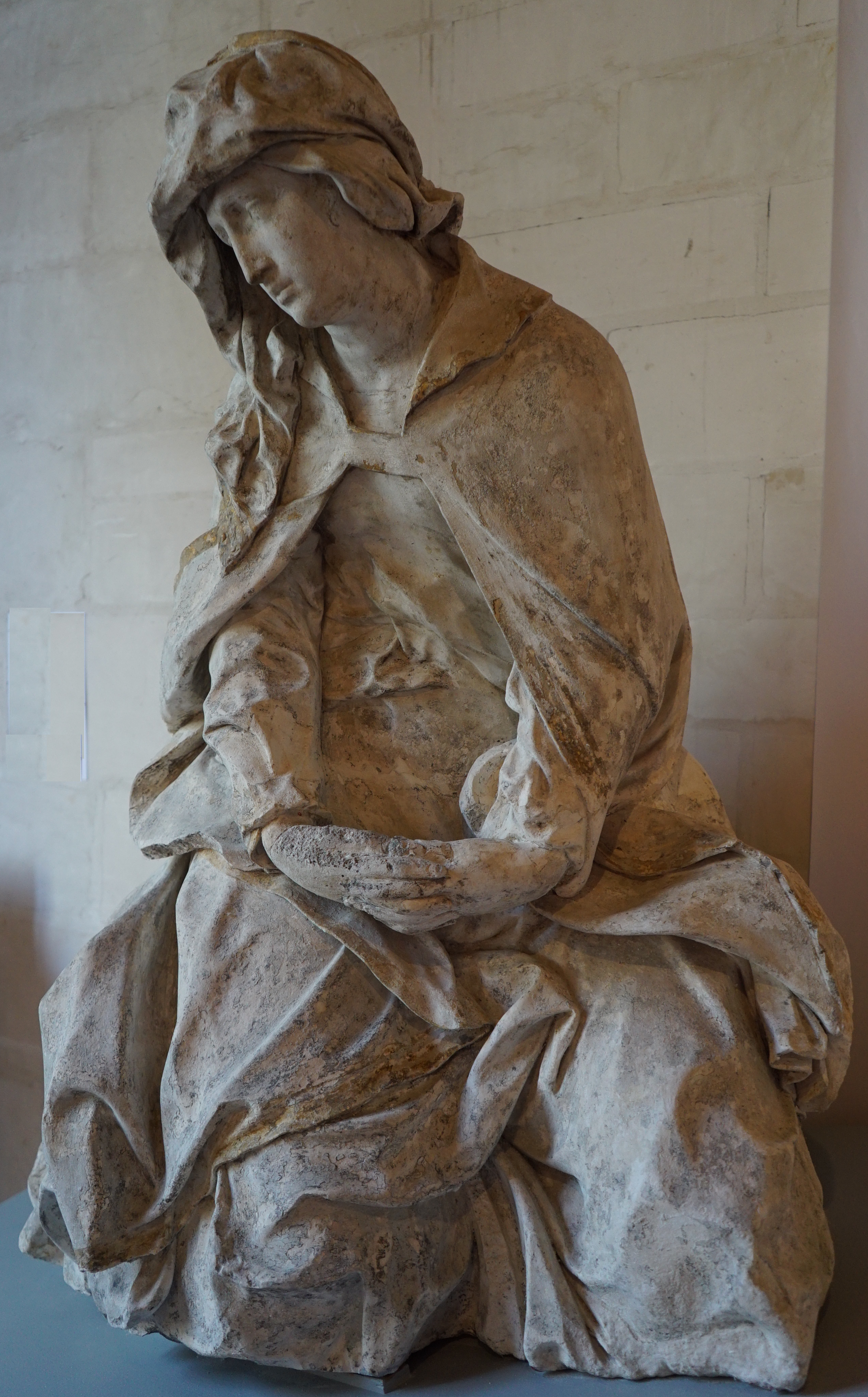
Mary by Domenico del Barbieri, from the church

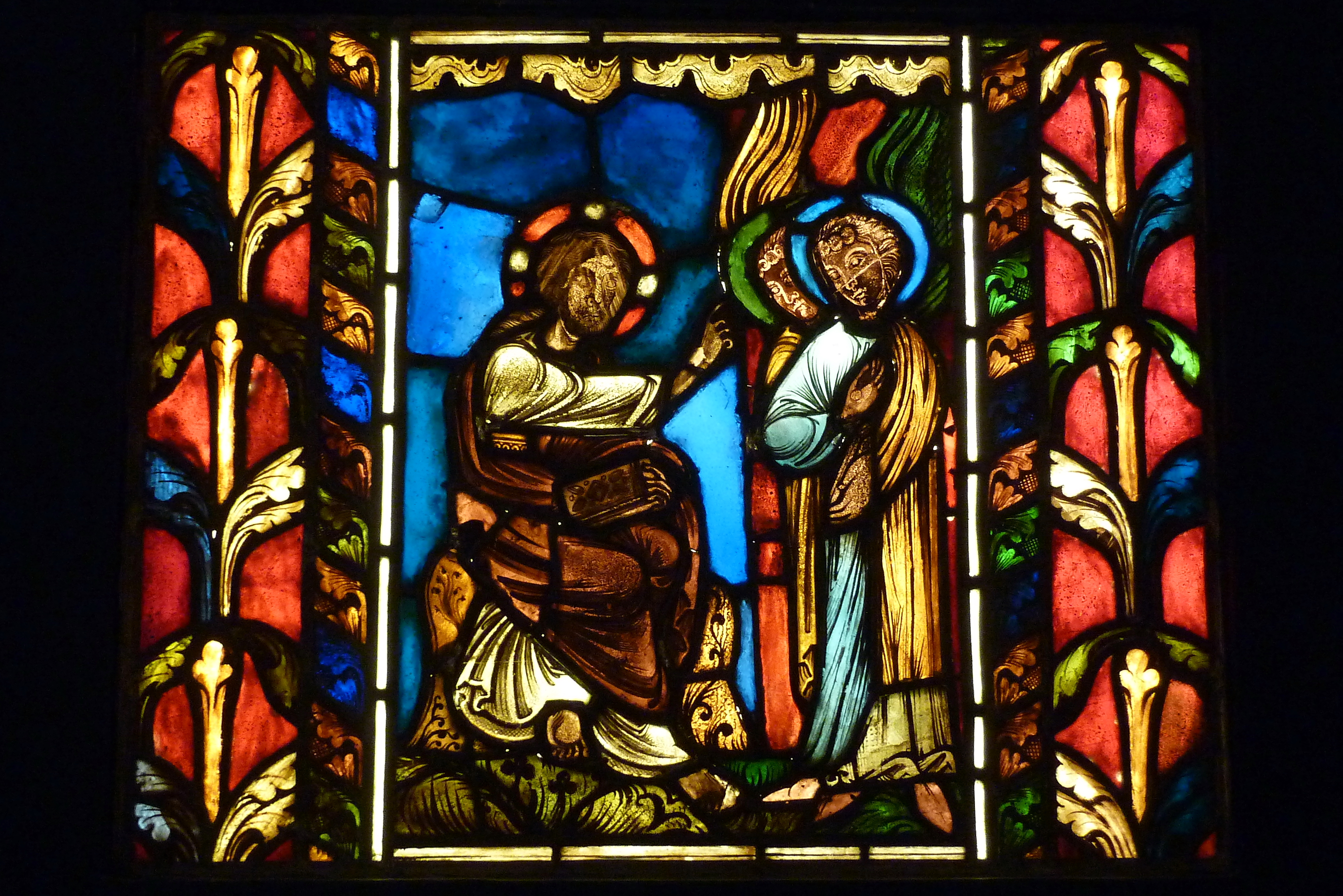
Stained glass from the church

== Deans ==
The church leaders were:

- Sub-dean until 1191: Villain
- Sub-dean until 1212: Henri, brother of Jean le Breban
- Sub-dean until 1274: Gui
- Dean 1157–62: Manassès de Villemaur, also archdeacon
- Cantor 1162–73: Jean
- Dean 1186–93: Haice de Plancy (Note: Haice Plancy, chancellor of the Count of Champagne, provost of Saint-Quiriace de Provins, sub-dean of Saint-Etienne and dean of Saint Peter between 1182 and 1189, became dean in 1186 and became bishop by the name of Barthélémi (Bartholomew) in 1190. He continued as both dean and bishop until his death in 1193.)
- Dean 1193–1203: Herbert de Villemaur
- Dean 1203–06: Herbert de Saint-Quentin
- Dean 1206: Etienne
- Chefcier (head of church) 1209: Dreux de Plancy
- Dean 1212–32: Barthélémi
- Sub-dean 1235–60: Garsie
- Dean 1236–76: Milon de Bar-sur-Aube (Note: Milo de Bar-sur-Aube, brother of Peter I de Bar, Sire de Jaucourt, became dean in 1236. He is mentioned as cantor of St. Maclou Bar-sur-Aube in 1226 and also as canon in Troyes Cathedral in 1230. He was archdeacon of Sézanne in 1260.)
- Dean 1276–89: Etienne de Luxeuil (Note: On 1 July 1279 Canon Robert made a distribution of money to all 43 canons of the collegiate.)
- Dean 1289–98: Garnier de Bricot
- Dean 1298–1306: Jean Osanne
- Dean 1314–34: Arnoul de Châlons sur Marne
- Dean 1337–42: Gautier d'Isle Aumont
- Dean 1353–74: Jean Charlin dit de Barbonne
- Dean 1374–90: Jean Buridan de Cambrai
- Dean 1390–97: Etienne de Méry sur Seine
- Dean 1397–1431: Nicole le Bourgoing. There were 57 canons in 1428
- Dean 1431–38: Jean du Chêne
- Dean 1438–39: Lambert Milon
- Dean 1439–45: Nicole Clément
- Dean 1445–75: Jean Jacob
- Dean 1476–83: Odard Hennequin
- Dean 1483–88:Jean Pinette
- Dean 1488–1509: Jean de Vélu
- Dean 1519–27: Pierre Jaquot
- Dean 1527–37: Gilles Guillaume
- Dean 1537–62: Yves Le Tartrier
- Dean 1562–65: Antoine de Jours
- Dean 1565–90: Yves le Tartrier, nephew of the previous dean, deputy at the Etats généraux of Blois in 1588
- Dean 1590–91: Jean le Maignan, doctor of theology of the University of Paris, Curé of Saint-Jean de Troyes
- Dean 1591–93: Odard Hennequin
- Dean 1593–1614: Claude Paillot
- Dean 1614–34: Nicolas de la Ferté

== Sources ==
- Abbé Coffinet (1860), Trésor de Saint-Étienne (in French), Troyes: Librairie Archéologique de Victor Didron
- Baudin, Arnaud (2006). "Saint-Etienne de Troyes" (in French). Archived from the original on 2015-12-22.
- "Chapitre de la collégiale Saint-Etienne. Troyes" (in French). BnF.
- Church, Stephen; Harvey, Ruth (1995), Medieval Knighthood V: Papers from the Sixth Strawberry Hill Conference 1994, Boydell & Brewer, ISBN 978-0-85115-628-6
- Coffinet (1852), Sceau de l'abbaye de Notre-Dame-aux-Nonnains de Troyes (douzième siècle) (in French), on souscrit chez M. A. Forgeais
- Evergates, Theodore (2010-08-03), Aristocratic Women in Medieval France, University of Pennsylvania Press, ISBN 978-0-8122-0061-4
- Jubainville, Henry Arbois de; Pigeotte, Léon (1866), Histoire des ducs et des comtes de Champagne ...: Fin du catalogue des actes des comtes de Champagne, tables, etc. 1866 (in French), A. Durand
- Lamauvinière, Abel (2015-09-13), "Fiche de la collégiale Saint-Etienne de Troyes", Collégiales – Base des collégiales séculières de France (816–1563) (in French)
- Morganstern, Anne McGee (2000), Gothic Tombs of Kinship in France, the Low Countries, and England, Penn State Press, ISBN 0-271-04317-2
- Wixom, William D.; Boehm, Barbara Drake (1999-01-01), Mirror of the Medieval World, Metropolitan Museum of Art, ISBN 978-0-87099-785-3
