= 1269 =

1269 in various calendars
Gregorian calendar	1269; MCCLXIX
Ab urbe condita	2022
Armenian calendar	718; ԹՎ ՉԺԸ
Assyrian calendar	6019
Balinese saka calendar	1190–1191
Bengali calendar	675–676
Berber calendar	2219
English Regnal year	53 Hen. 3 – 54 Hen. 3
Buddhist calendar	1813
Burmese calendar	631
Byzantine calendar	6777–6778
Chinese calendar	戊辰年 (Earth Dragon); 3966 or 3759 — to — 己巳年 (Earth Snake); 3967 or 3760
Coptic calendar	985–986
Discordian calendar	2435
Ethiopian calendar	1261–1262
Hebrew calendar	5029–5030
- Hindu calendars
Vikram Samvat	1325–1326
Shaka Samvat	1190–1191
Kali Yuga	4369–4370
Holocene calendar	11269
Igbo calendar	269–270
Iranian calendar	647–648
Islamic calendar	667–668
Japanese calendar	Bun'ei 6 (文永６年)
Javanese calendar	1179–1180
Julian calendar	1269; MCCLXIX
Korean calendar	3602
Minguo calendar	643 before ROC 民前643年
Nanakshahi calendar	−199
Thai solar calendar	1811–1812
Tibetan calendar	ས་ཕོ་འབྲུག་ལོ་ (male Earth-Dragon); 1395 or 1014 or 242 — to — ས་མོ་སྦྲུལ་ལོ་ (female Earth-Snake); 1396 or 1015 or 243

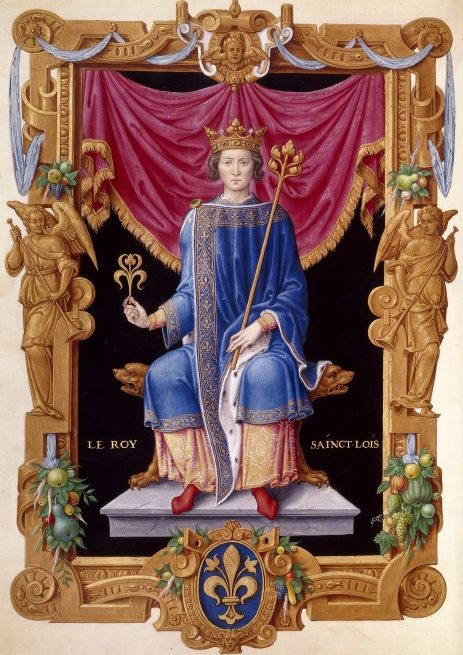
King Louis IX of France ("the Saint") (1214–1270)

Year 1269 (MCCLXIX) was a common year starting on Tuesday of the Julian calendar.

== Events ==
=== By place ===
==== Europe ====
- June 16 – Battle of Colle Val d'Elsa: Guelph forces (2,200 men) led by King Charles I of Anjou defeat the Ghibellines at Tuscany. After the battle, the Guelphs drive out their adversaries at Colle di Val d'Elsa, destroying their houses, and confiscating their possessions.
- June 19 – King Louis IX of France ("the Saint") orders all Jews found in public without an identifying yellow badge to be fined ten livres of silver. He also confiscates goods from the Jewish population to fund the Eighth Crusade.
- September – An Aragonese contingent under King James I ("the Conqueror") sails from Barcelona to the Holy Land but is caught in a storm and badly damaged. One squadron reaches Acre, but later returns to Catalonia.
- King Ottokar II of Bohemia inherits Carinthia and part of Carniola, making him the most powerful German prince within the Holy Roman Empire; the empire lacking an emperor during the ongoing “Great Interregnum”.

==== Britain ====
- Prince Edward (the Lord Edward) of England obtains the right to levy a twentieth of the value of the Church's wealth to finance the Ninth Crusade. That sum turns out to be insufficient, and Edward has to borrow to reach his target.
- John I Comyn, Lord of Badenoch, begins the construction of Blair Castle in Scotland.

==== Africa ====
- September 8 – Berber forces of the Marinid Sultanate under Abu Yusuf Yaqub ibn Abd al-Haqq complete the conquest of Morocco and capture Marrakesh after a long siege, effectively ending the Almohad Caliphate. The last Almohad ruler, Idris al-Wathiq (or Abu Dabbus), is assassinated by a slave. The Marinids become the new masters of the western Maghreb and Abu Yusuf Yaqub takes up the title of "Prince of the Muslims".

=== By topic ===
==== Religion ====
- March – Ode de Pougy, French Abbess of Notre Dame aux Nonnains, and several associates who assist her, are excommunicated.
- Approximate date – Opizzo Fieschi, Latin patriarch of Antioch, is exiled, being displaced because of the East–West Schism of 1054.

==== Science ====
- Petrus Peregrinus de Maricourt, French mathematician and writer, performs a series of experiments with magnetic poles and proposes that a machine can be run forever in perpetual motion using the properties of magnets.

== Births ==
- February 9 – Louis III, Duke of Bavaria, German nobleman, knight and regent (d. 1296)
- June 18 – Eleanor of England, English princess (d. 1298)
- July 10 – Emperor Duanzong (or Zhao Shi) of China (d. 1278)
- September 5 – Agnes of Bohemia, Duchess of Austria (d. 1296)
- November – Philip of Artois, French nobleman and knight (d. 1298)
- Alexander of San Elpidio, Italian friar and bishop (d. 1326)
- Frederick Tuta, German nobleman and regent (d. 1291)
- Huang Gongwang (or Lu Jian), Chinese painter (d. 1354)
- Nichizō, Japanese Buddhist monk and disciple (d. 1342)

== Deaths ==
- April – Geoffrey of Sergines, French nobleman and knight (b. 1205)
- July 7 – Saionji Saneuji, Japanese poet and writer (b. 1194)
- October 1 – Giordano Pironti, Italian aristocrat and cardinal
- October 27 – Ulrich III, Duke of Carinthia, German nobleman and knight (b. 1220)
- Abu al-Hasan al-Shushtari, Moorish poet and writer (b. 1212)
- Albin of Brechin (or Albinus), Scottish prelate and bishop
- Constance of Aragon, Lady of Villena, Spanish princess (infanta) (b. 1239)
- Ebulo de Montibus, Savoyan nobleman and knight (b. 1230)
- Gregorio di Montelongo, Italian bishop of Tripoli (b. 1200)
- Guigues VII, French ruler (dauphin) of Viennois (b. 1225)
- Idris al-Wathiq (or Abu Dabbus), Almohad ruler (caliph)
- John Lestrange, English landowner, knight and border lord (b. 1194)
- Liu Kezhuang, Chinese poet and literary critic (b. 1187)
- Oberto Pallavicino, Italian nobleman (signore) and field captain (b. 1197)
- Vasylko Romanovych, Grand Prince of Kiev (b. 1203)
- William (III) de Beauchamp, English nobleman (b. 1215)
