= Manasses II =

Manasses II may refer to:

- Manasses II of Langres (died before 925)
- Manasses II, Count of Rethel (died 1032)
- Manasses II (archbishop of Reims) (died 1106)
- Manasses II of Guînes (died 1137)
- Manasses II (bishop of Meaux) (died 1158)
- Manasses of Garlande (died 1185), bishop of Orléans as Manasses II
- Manasses of Pougy (died 1190), bishop of Troyes as Manasses II

== See also ==
- Manasses I
- Manasses III
