= Folcric =

Folcric (Latin Folcricus, Flochericus, Fulchericus, Fulcherius, French Foucher) was a Frankish cleric. He served under King Charles the Bald as a palace notary before being appointed bishop of the diocese of Troyes in 861. He succeeded the famous historian Prudentius as bishop.

At the height of his career at the royal court, Folcric was Charles's busiest notary. Of the sixteen preserved royal charters written in 859, almost three quarters (eleven) were drawn up by Folcric.

Folcric was a friend and correspondent of Abbot Lupus of Ferrières. In a letter of March 862 Lupus thanked him for visiting Ferrières and giving its monks and treasure shelter in his estate at Aix-en-Othe during a Viking raid.

Folcric died in 869.

== Sources ==
- Duckett, Eleanor Shipley (1969). Carolingian Portraits: A Study in the Ninth Century. Ann Arbor Paperbacks.
- Nelson, J. L. (1992). Charles the Bald. London: Longman.
- Verdin, Georges (1927). "Note sur les anciens catalogues épiscopaux de Troyes". Revue d'histoire de l'Église de France. 13 (58): 51–54.

Preceded by Prudentius	Bishop of Troyes; 861–869	Succeeded by Ottulf
