= Diocese of Troyes =

Latin Catholic ecclesiastical jurisdiction in France

Coordinates: 48.30°N 4.08°E

Diocese of Troyes Dioecesis Trecensis Diocèse de Troyes

Catholic
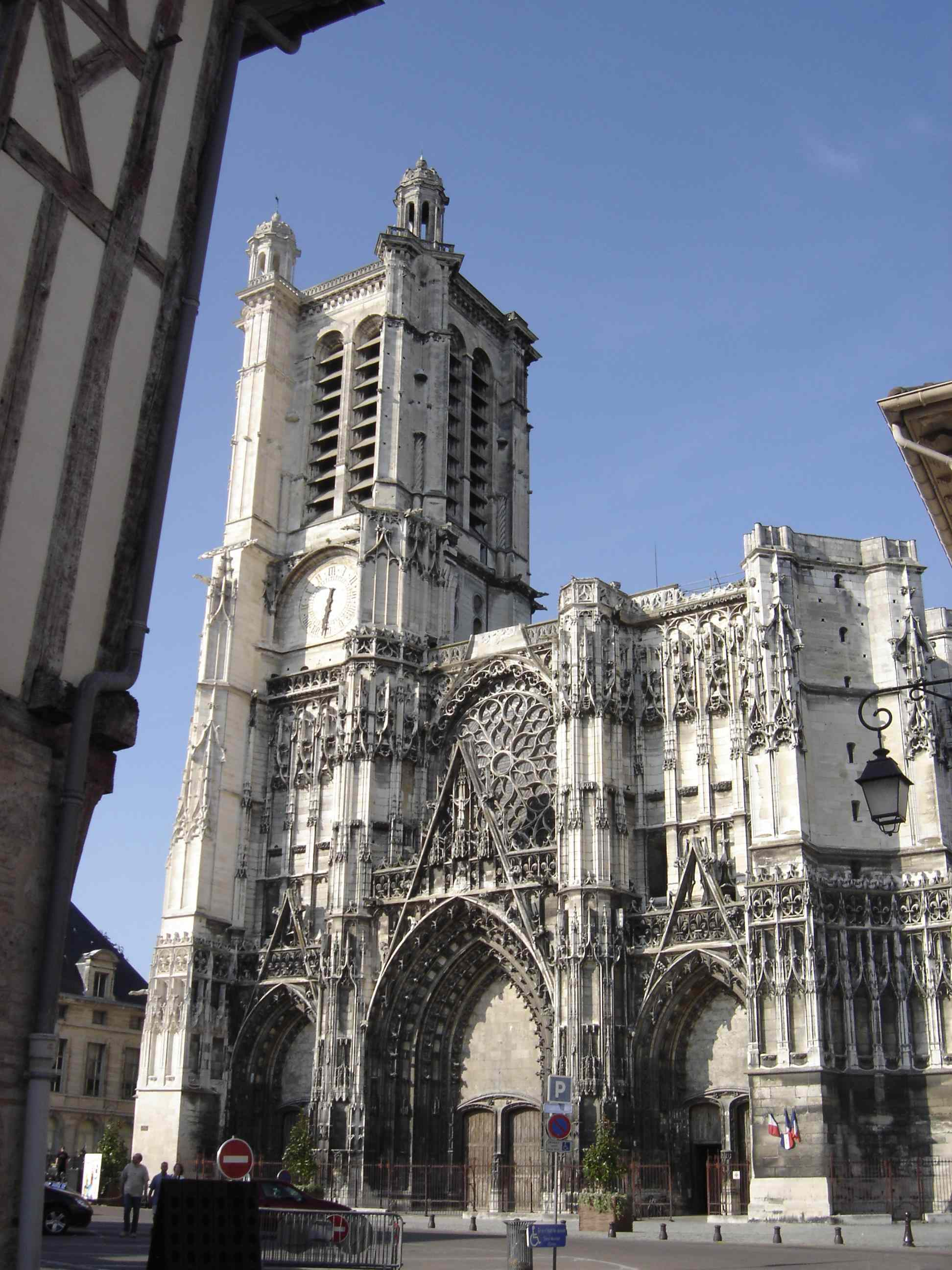
- Troyes Cathedral

Location
- Country: France
- Ecclesiastical province: Reims
- Metropolitan: Archdiocese of Reims

Statistics
- Area: 6,028 km^{2} (2,327 sq mi)
- Population: Total; Catholics: (as of 2022); 310,242; 216,000 (69.6%)
- Parishes: 43 ('new parishes')

Information
- Denomination: Catholic Church
- Sui iuris church: Latin Church
- Rite: Roman Rite
- Established: 4th century
- Cathedral: Cathedral of St. Peter and St. Paul in Troyes
- Patron saint: Saint Peter; Saint Paul
- Secular priests: 40 (Diocesan); 10 (Religious Orders); 22 Permanent Deacons

Current leadership
- Pope: Leo XIV
- Bishop elect: Alexandre Joly
- Metropolitan Archbishop: Éric de Moulins-Beaufort
- Bishops emeritus: Marc Stenger

Map

Website
- cathotroyes.fr

The Diocese of Troyes (Latin: Dioecesis Trecensis; French: Diocèse de Troyes) is a Latin Church ecclesiastical territory or diocese of the Catholic Church in Troyes, France. The diocese now comprises the département of Aube. Erected in the 4th century, the diocese is currently a suffragan diocese in the ecclesiastical province of the metropolitan Archdiocese of Reims. It was re-established in 1802 as a suffragan of the Archbishopric of Paris, when it comprised the départements of Aube and Yonne and its bishop had the titles of Troyes, Auxerre, and Châlons-sur-Marne. In 1822, the See of Châlons was created and the Bishop of Troyes lost that title. When Sens was made an archdiocese, the episcopal title of Auxerre went to it and Troyes lost also the département of Yonne, which became the Archdiocese of Sens. The Diocese of Troyes covers, besides the ancient diocesan limits, 116 parishes of the ancient Diocese of Langres and 20 belonging to the ancient diocese of Sens. On 8 December 2002, the Diocese of Troyes was returned to its ancient metropolitan, the Archbishop of Reims. As of 2022, there was one priest for every 4,320 Catholics.

When Troyes was the seat of the Bishop as well as of the Comte de Champagne, there was always tension between the two in terms of power and influence. After 1314, when Louis de Navarre became King Louis X of France, the competition was more distant but the competitor far more powerful. The Capitular Church of Saint-Étienne became a royal church, and the King tolerated no interference from the Bishop in his prerogatives.

== History ==
The catalogue of bishops of Troyes is first found in manuscripts of the 12th century, though it can be shown that there was a list of bishops by the 9th century. In the opinion of Louis Duchesne, the list is worthy of confidence, at least from the 5th century on. The putative first bishop, St. Amator, seems to have preceded by a few years Bishop Optatianus who probably ruled the diocese about 344.

During his term, Bishop Ottulph (870-883) began to rebuild the cathedral, which had fallen in ruins due to neglect; coincidentally, he discovered the body of Saint Frobert, which became an object of veneration. In 878, he was host to Pope John VIII who had abandoned Italy, fleeing from the violence of Lambert, Duke of Spoleto. In 889, during the administration of Bishop Bodon, the entire town of Troyes was reduced to ashes by an invasion of Northmen.

There have been several councils held at Troyes, including those of 867, 878 (over which Pope John VIII presided), 1078, 1104 and 1107 (over which Pope Paschal II presided).

=== Cathedral, Collegiate Churches, Parishes ===
The Cathedral of Troyes is a fine Gothic structure begun in the 12th century, and completed in the 15th. The Cathedral Chapter has eight dignities: the Dean (who is elected by the Canons), the Treasurer, the Cantor, the Great Archdeacon (the Archdeacon of Troyes), the Archdeacon of Sessana, the Archdeacon of Arceis (Arcis), the Archdeacon of Brienne, and the Archdeacon of S. Margarita (Margerie). There were thirty-seven Canons, one of whom was the Prior of S. Georges de Gannayo. The Canons were appointed alternately by the Bishop and by the King. The most famous of the Deans of Troyes was Petrus Comestor (ca. 1110–1179), who was born in Troyes and became a priest of the diocese; he was then professor of theology in Paris, and Chancellor of the Cathedral of Notre-Dame de Paris.

In the diocese of Troyes, there were ten collegiate churches:

- Saint-Étienne, in Troyes, a college royale
- Saint-Urbain, in Troyes (founded by Pope Urban IV ca. 1264)
- Saint Nicolas de Sézanne (founded 1164)
- Lirey (founded 1353)
- Broyes (founded 1081)
- Pleurs (founded 1180)
- Pougy (founded 1154)
- Plancy (founded 1206)
- Villemaur (founded 1124)
- Beaufort-Montmorency

At the beginning of the fifteenth century, there was a grand total of 185 Canons in the diocese of Troyes. By the beginning of the eighteenth, there were only 117.

Also at the beginning of the fifteenth century, there were 358 parishes in the diocese.

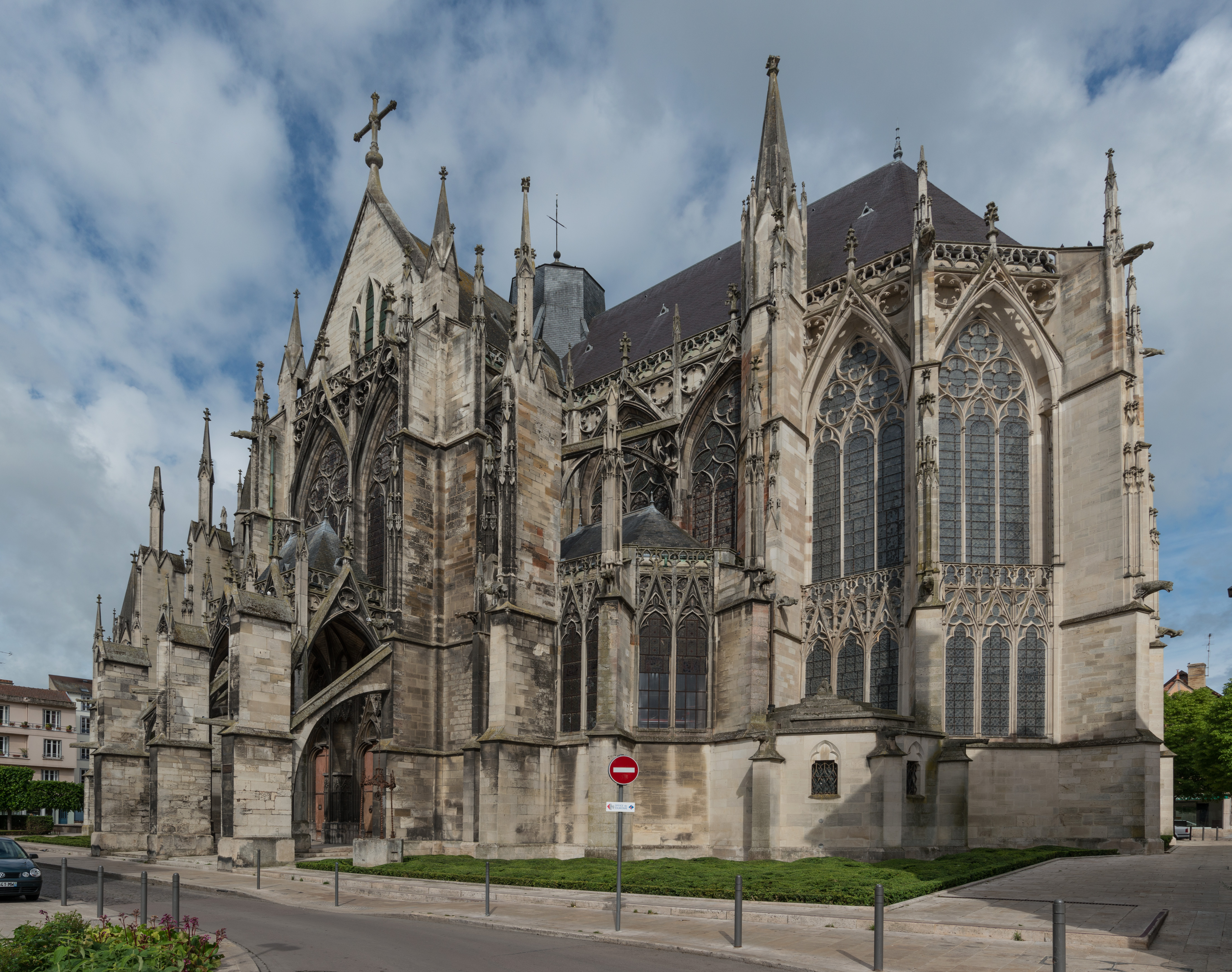
Saint-Urbain

The ancient collegiate Church of St. Urbain is a Gothic building whose lightness of treatment is reminiscent of La Sainte-Chapelle at Paris. Its construction was begun by Urban IV in 1262; the choir was completed in 1265, though the edifice was damaged by fire in 1266. The nave and façade are of the 19th and 20th centuries. Urban was a native of Troyes, and he prevailed upon the nuns of Notre-Dame-aux-Nonnans to sell him the land on which his father's house stood for a new church; on one of the stained-glass windows he caused his father to be depicted, working at his trade of tailor. The College of twelve Canons was headed by a Dean, and there was a Cantor and a Treasurer.

On 20 June 1353, Geoffroy de Charny, Lord of Savoisy and Lirey, founded at Lirey a collegiate church with six canonries, in honour of the Annunciation of the Virgin Mary, and in this church he exposed for veneration a Holy Shroud. Opposition arose on the part of the Bishop of Troyes, who declared after due inquiry that the relic was nothing but a painting, a fact to which the creator of the "relic" confessed. Therefore, the Bishop opposed its being exhibited. Clement VI, persuaded by interested parties, issued four Bulls on 30 January 1354, approving the exposition as lawful, and two more, on 3 August 1354 (granting indulgences) and 5 June 1357. In 1418 during the civil wars, the Canons entrusted the Winding Sheet to Humbert, Count de La Roche, Lord of Lirey. Margaret, widow of Humbert, never returned it but gave it in 1452 to the Duke of Savoy. The requests of the canons of Lirey were unavailing, and the Lirey shroud is claimed to be the same that is now on display in Turin.

=== Revolution ===
The diocese of Troyes was abolished during the French Revolution by the Legislative Assembly, under the Civil Constitution of the Clergy (1790). Its territory was subsumed into the new diocese, called the 'Aube', which was part of the Metropolitanate called the 'Metropole de Paris' (which included seven new 'départements'). The majority of clergy in the diocese of Troyes took the oath to the Constitution. The legitimate bishop, Louis-Mathias-Joseph de Barral, refused to take the oath, departed Troyes on 11 March 1791, and emigrated to Switzerland by way of Trier. Many of the non-jurors emigrated in September 1792, eighty-three of them seeking refuge in Switzerland. Those who were too old or ill were rounded up and incarcerated in the College of the Oratory. The diocesan seminary did not have enough teachers or students to continue to function; the building was used as a detention center for suspicious persons.

In Switzerland, Bishop de Barral conferred with a number of his fellow exiles from the episcopal college, who came to the opinion that one might swear the Constitutional oath. Bishop de Barral left them and travelled to London, where he found the episcopal sentiment much more rigorous. Nonetheless, in 1791, he wrote a letter in which he approved the submission, though without blaming the recusants. In 1800, he declared himself for taking the oath. After Napoleon came to power on 18 Brumaire 1799, de Barral wrote to the priests of his diocese that it was acceptable to take the oath to the Consulate. On 5 October 1801, he resigned his bishopric, following the demand of Pope Pius VII for the resignation of all French bishops. He returned to France, and was named Bishop of Meaux on 18 April 1802.

As for those left behind, on 20 March 1791 the electors of 'Aube' met and elected as their bishop Augustin Sibille, who had been curé of the parish of Saint-Pantaleon in Troyes for thirty years. He was consecrated in Paris on 3 April by Constitutional Bishops Jean Baptiste Gobel (Paris), Miroudot and Gouttes. The consecration was valid, but it was illicit and schismatic; no bulls of consecration had been issued by Pope Pius VI. Bishop Sibille took possession of his cathedral in Troyes on Palm Sunday, 17 April 1791. At the end of 1793, however, the closing of all churches and the abolition of religion was decreed by the Conventionist Alexandre Rousselin. Sibille resigned the priesthood on 18 November 1793, which saved him from certain death at the hands of the Terror. He died on 11 February 1798.

On 1 July 1791, all of the members of the mendicant religious orders in the seven or eight convents which they occupied in Troyes were ordered to take up residence at the Convent of the Capucines where they were to live in common; they numbered some twenty persons. The Carthusians as well were rounded up and sent to the same place. Their properties and goods were to be sold. The Abbey of Saint-Loup was sold and its goods sold off, except for the relics, which were taken by Bishop Sibille to the Cathedral. Similar actions were carried out at Saint-Étienne, Saint-Pierre and Saint Lyé. Even the remains of the Counts of Champagne, Henri the Liberal and Thibault III, were exhumed and taken to the Cathedral. When the turn of Clairvaux came for the goods to be confiscated and the buildings demolished, Bernard of Clairvaux and Malachy of Armagh were turned out of their reliquaries and tombs. The locals of Clairvaux, according to the official story, preserved the remains, and Bishop Emmanuel-Jules Ravinet had those gathered up in 1875 and brought to the Cathedral in Troyes, where they are still kept.

=== Religious Houses ===
The Abbey of Nesle la Riposte was founded before 545 near Villenauxe, perhaps by Queen Clotilde. In the 16th century, after the Wars of Religion and the depredations of the Huguenots, the abbey was united to that at Saint-Vannes, and the monks caused the original doorway of Nesle Abbey to be rebuilt at Villenauxe, with the actual stones which they brought from Nesle. The Benedictine Mabillon undertook to interpret its carvings, among which might be seen the statue of a reine pédauque (i.e. a web-footed queen) supposed to be St. Clotilde.

The Abbey of Notre Dame aux Nonnains, founded by St. Leucon, was an important abbey for women. Alcuin and St. Bernard corresponded with its abbesses. At his installation the bishop went to the abbey on the previous evening; the bed he slept on became his property, but the mule on which he rode became the property of the abbess. The abbess led the bishop by the hand into the chapter hall; she put on his mitre, offered him his crozier, and in return the bishop promised to respect the rights of the abbey. The Jansenists in the 18th century made a great noise over the pretended cure by the deacon François Paris of Marie Madeleine de Mégrigny, a nun of Notre Dame aux Nonnains.

The part of the Diocese of Troyes which formerly belonged to the Diocese of Langres contained the famous Abbey of Clairvaux, though the Abbey of Clairvaux and its possessions were exempt from episcopal interference and were dependent directly on the pope.

The Abbey of the Paraclete was founded by the poet and theologian Abelard. In it the Abbess Heloise died in 1163; her body was interred there, and the remains of Abelard were buried there as well, until ejected by fanatics of the Revolution in 1792. Their present whereabouts is a matter of dispute. Nothing remains of the abbey.

=== Religious Orders at Troyes in the 17th and 18th centuries ===
Cardinal Pierre de Bérulle (1575–1629) was brought up on the Bérulle estate in the diocese. He preached at Troyes before founding the Oratorians. An Oratory was opened at Troyes in 1617; it was suppressed in 1792. Charles-Louis de Lantage, b. at Troyes in 1616, d. in 1694, was one of the chief helpers of Jean-Jacques Olier, founder of the Sulpicians.

=== Religious Orders at Troyes in the 19th century ===
Before the application of the Associations Law (1901), which instituted the separation between church and state in France, there were, in the Diocese of Troyes, Benedictines, Jesuits, Lazarists, Oblates of St. Francis of Sales, and Brothers of the Christian Schools. Many female congregations arose in the diocese, among others the Ursulines of Christian Teaching, founded at Moissy l'Evêque in the eighteenth century by Gilbert Gaspard de Montmorin, Bishop of Langres; the Sisters of Christian Instruction, founded in 1819, with motherhouse at Troyes; the Oblate Sisters of St. Francis de Sales, a teaching order, founded in 1866, with motherhouse at Troyes; Sisters of Notre Dame de Bon Secours, a nursing community with motherhouse at Troyes.

== Bishops of Troyes ==
=== To 1000 ===
- Amator, c. 340
- Optatius, 346–347
- Léon Heraclius
- Saint Mellonius (Melaine), 390–400
- Aurelius
- Saint Ursus, 426)
- Saint Lupus I (426–478)
- Saint Camelianus (Camelien) (479–536 or 511–525)
- Saint Vincent, 536–546 or 533–541
- Ambrosius, 549
- Gallomagnus, 573–582
- Agrecius, 585–586
- Lupus II
- Evodius, c. 631
- Modegisil
- Ragnegisil
- Saint Leuconius (Leucoin), 651–656
- Saint Nicolas de Matthieu
- Bertoald
- Abbon, 666–673
- Waimer, 675–678
- Vulfred
- Ragembert
- Aldebert
- Gaucher
- Ardouin
- Censard, c. 722
- Saint Bobinus (Bobin), 750–766, previously Abbot of Monstier la Celle
- Amingus
- Adelgar, c. 787
- Bertulf
- Elie, c. 829–936
- Adalbert, 837–845
- Saint Prudentius, 845–861, who wrote against Gottschalk and Eriugena
- Folcric, 861–869
- Ottulf, c. 880
- Bodon, c. 890
- Riveus, c. 895
- Otbert, c. 910
- Ansegisel, 914–970
- Walon, 971
- Ayric
- Milon I, 980–982
- Manasses (Menasses), 991 or 985–993
- Renaud I

=== 1000 to 1300 ===
- attested 998–1034: Frotmundus (Fromond I.)
- 1034–1049: Mainard
- 1050: Fromond II.
- 1075: Hugo I. de Paris
- 1075: Gauthier
- 1075–1082: Hugo II. de Moeslain (House of Dampierre)
- 1083–1121: Philippe de Pont (Milon II)
- 1121–1122: Renaud II (Houses of Montlhéry and Le Puiset)
- 1122–1145: Atton (or Hatton)
- 1145–1169: Heinrich von Sponheim (Spanheimer), O.Cist.
- 1169–1180: Matthieu
- 1181–1190: Manassés II (de Pougy)
- 1190–1193: Barthélémy
- 1193–1205: Garnier de Traînel
- 1207–1223: Hervée
- 1223–1233: Robert
- 1233–1269: Nicolas
- 1269–1298: Jean de Nanteuil
- 1299–1314: Guichard

=== 1300 to 1500 ===
- 1314–1317: Jean d'Auxois
- 1317–1324: Guillaume Méchin (transferred to Dol)
- 1324–1326: Jean de Cherchemont (transferred to Amiens)
- 1326–1341: Jean d'Aubigny
- 1342–1353: Jean V. (transferred to Auxerre)
- 1354–1370: Henri de Poitiers
- 1370–1375: Jean de Bracque
- 1375–1377: Pierre de Villiers
- 1377–1395: Pierre d'Arcis
- 1395–1426: Etienne de Givry (appointed by Benedict XIII of the Avignon Obedience)
- 1426–1450: Jean Léguisé
- 1450–1483: Louis I Raguier
- 1483–1518: Jacques Raguier

=== 1500 to 1800 ===
- 1519–1527: Guillaume II.
- 1528–1544: Odard Hennequin
- 1545–1550: Louis de Lorraine-Guise
- 1551–1561: Antonio Caracciolo, C.R.S.A.
- 1562–1593: C. de Beauffremont
- 1604–1641: Renée de Breslay
- 1641–1678: F. Malier du Houssay
- 1678–1697: François Bouthillier de Chavigny (resigned, in favor of his nephew)
- 1697–1716: Denis-François Bouthillier de Chavigny (appointed as Archbishop of Sens)
- 1716–1742: Jacques-Bénigne Bossuet II (retired)
- 1742–1758: Mathias Poncet de la Rivière (resigned)
- 1758–1761: Jean-Baptiste-Marie Champion de Cicé (appointed as Bishop of Auxerre)
- 1761–1790: Louis-Claude-Mathias-Joseph Conte de Barral (retired)
- 1790–1801: Louis-Mathias-Joseph de Barral (resigned)
  - 1791–1793: Augustin Sibille (Constitutional Bishop of Aube)
  - 1798–1801: Jean-Baptiste Blampoix (Constitutional Bishop of Aube)

=== From 1800 ===
- Marc-Antoine de Noé (11 April 1802 – 21 September 1802 died)
- Louis-Apolinaire de La Tour du Pin-Montauban (30 September 1802 – 28 November 1807 died)
- Etienne-Marie de Boulogne (8 March 1808 – 13 May 1825 died)
- Jacques-Louis-David de Seguin des Hons (22 Jun 1825 – 31 Aug 1843 died)
- Jean-Marie-Mathias Debelay (19 November 1843 – 16 October 1848 appointed, Archbishop of Avignon)
- Pierre-Louis Coeur (16 October 1848 – 9 October 1860 died)
- Emmanuel-Jules Ravinet (11 Dec 1860 – 2 August 1875 retired)
- Pierre-Louis-Marie Cortet (3 August 1875 – 16 February 1898 died)
- Gustave-Adolphe de Pélacot (22 March 1898 – 15 June 1907 appointed, Archbishop of Chambéry)
- Laurent-Marie-Etienne Monnier (6 October 1907 – 7 July 1927 died)
- Maurice Feltin (19 December 1927 – 16 August 1932 appointed, Archbishop of Sens)
- Joseph-Jean Heintz (7 December 1933 appointed – 15 February 1938 appointed, Bishop of Metz)
- Joseph-Charles Lefèbvre (27 July 1938 appointed – 17 June 1943 appointed, Archbishop of Bourges)
- Julien Le Couëdic (4 November 1943 appointed – 21 February 1967 retired)
- André Pierre Louis Marie Fauchet (21 February 1967 appointed – 4 April 1992 retired)
- Gérard Antoine Daucourt (4 April 1992 succeeded – 2 July 1998 appointed Bishop of Orléans)
- Marc Camille Michel Stenger (30 April 1999 appointed – 28 December 2020 resigned)
- Alexandre Joly (11 December 2021 appointed – )

== Saints connected with the diocese ==
Among the many saints specially honoured or connected with the diocese are:

- Sabinian of Troyes, Apostle of Troyes
- St. Romanus, Archbishop of Reims, founder of the Monastery of SS. Gervasus and Protasius at Chantenay in the diocese of Troyes (d. c. 537);
- St. Frobert, founder and first Abbot of Montier le Celle (d. 688)
- St Aderaldus, canon and archdeacon of Troyes, who died in 1004 on returning from the Crusade, and who founded the Benedictine monastery of the Holy Sepulchre in the diocese
- St. Simon, Count de Bar-sur-Aube, solitary, acted as mediator between Pope Gregory VII and Robert Guiscard, and died in 1082
- St. Robert, founder of Molesme and Cîteaux, a native of the diocese (1024–1108)
- St. Elizabeth of Chelles, foundress of the monastery of Rosoy (d. c. 1130)
- St Hombelina, first Abbess of Jully-sur-Sarce, and sister of St. Bernard (1092–1135)
- Blessed Peter, an Englishman, prior of Jully-sur-Sarce (d. 1139)
- St. Bernard of Clairvaux, first Abbot of Clairvaux (1091–1153)
- Marguerite Bourgeoys (1620–1700), foundress of the Congregation of Notre Dame at Montreal, a native of the diocese
- Marie de Sales Chappuis, superioress of the Visitation Convent at Troyes (d. 1875)
- St. Exuperantia, a virgin associated with the Isle of Aumont

== See also ==
- List of bishops of Troyes
- G-Catholic, Diocese of Troyes France, retrieved: 2016-09-22.
- Diocèse de Troyes (in French)
- Relics of St. Bernard, Treasury, Cathedral of SS. Peter and Paul, Troyes. Retrieved: 2016-09-26.

== Bibliography ==
=== Reference works ===
- Gams, Pius Bonifatius (1873). Series episcoporum Ecclesiae catholicae: quotquot innotuerunt a beato Petro apostolo. Ratisbon: Typis et Sumptibus Georgii Josephi Manz. pp. 642–644. (Use with caution; obsolete)
- Jean, Armand (1891). Les évêques et les archevêques de France depuis 1682 jusqu'à 1801 (in French). Paris: A. Picard.
- Eubel, Conradus, ed. (1913). Hierarchia catholica, Tomus 1 (second ed.). Münster: Libreria Regensbergiana. (in Latin) pp. 493–494.
- Eubel, Conradus, ed. (1914). Hierarchia catholica, Tomus 2 (second ed.). Münster: Libreria Regensbergiana. (in Latin) p. 254.
- Gulik, Guilelmus (1923). Eubel, Conradus (ed.). Hierarchia catholica, Tomus 3 (second ed.). Münster: Libreria Regensbergiana. p. 317.
- Gauchat, Patritius (Patrice) (1935). Hierarchia catholica IV (1592-1667). Münster: Libraria Regensbergiana. p. 342.
- Ritzler, Remigius; Sefrin, Pirminus (1952). Hierarchia catholica medii et recentis aevi V (1667-1730). Patavii: Messagero di S. Antonio. p. 386-387.
- Ritzler, Remigius; Sefrin, Pirminus (1958). Hierarchia catholica medii et recentis aevi VI (1730-1799). Patavii: Messagero di S. Antonio. p. 413.

=== Studies ===
- Arbois de Julainville, H. D. (1853). Pouillé du diocese de Troyes redigé en 1407 (in French). Paris: Durand.
- Babeau, Albert (1873). Histoire de Troyes pendant la Révolution (in French). Vol. Tome I (1792–1800). Paris: Dumoulin.
- Babeau, Albert (1874). Histoire de Troyes pendant la Révolution (in French). Vol. Tome II (1792–1800). Paris: Dumoulin.
- Courtalon-Delaistre, Jean Charles (1783). Topographie historique de la ville et du diocèse de Troyes (in French). Vol. Tome I. Paris: Fournier.
- Courtalon-Delaistre, Jean-Charles (1783b). Topographie historique de la ville et diocèse de Troyes (in French). Vol. Tome II. Paris: Fournier.
- Courtalon-Delaistre, Jean-Charles (1784). Topographie historique de la ville et diocèse de Troyes (in French). Vol. Tome III. Paris: Fournier.
- Crété-Protin, Isabelle (2002). Église et vie chrétienne dans le diocèse de Troyes du IVe au IXe siècle (in French). Villemeive d'Ascq: Presses Univ. Septentrion. ISBN 978-2-85939-753-1.
- Écalle, P[ierre] F[élix] (1904). Claude Arvisenet, chanoine, vicaire général de Troyes (in French). Troyes: J. Frémont. [Revolution, Consulate, Restoration, 1st half of 19th century]
- Écalle, Pierre Félix (1907). Le schisme constitutionnel à Troyes, 1790-1801 (in French). Troyes: G. Frémont. [the ultramontane point-of-view]
- Fisquet, Honoré (1864). La France pontificale (Gallia Christiana): Métropole de Sens: Troyes—Moulins (in French). Paris: Etienne Repos. pp. 1–127.
- Lalore, Charles (1867). Les synodes du diocèse de Troyes (in French). Troyes: E. Caffé.
- Lalore, Charles; Nioré, (Abbe) (1893). Collection de documents inédits relatifs à la ville de Troyes et à la Champagne méridionale (in French). Troyes: Lacroix. p. cxxxiv.
- Murray, Stephen (1987). Building Troyes Cathedral: The Late Gothic Campaigns. Bloomington: Indiana University Press. ISBN 978-0-253-31277-8.
- Prévost, Arthur Émile (1908). Histoire du diocèse de Troyes pendant la Révolution (in French). Vol. Tome I. Troyes: G. Frémont.
- Roserot de Melin, Joseph (1957). Le diocèse de Troyes des origines à nos jours (IIIe s.-1955) (in French). Troyes: Impr. La Renaissance.
- Sainte-Marthe, Denis de (1770). Gallia Christiana: De provinciis Senonensi & Tarentasiensi. Vol. Tomus duodecimus (XII). Paris: Typographia Regia. pp. 484–624, Instrumenta, pp. 248–296.
- Verdin, Georges (1927). "Note sur les anciens catalogues épiscopaux de Troyes". Revue d'histoire de l'Église de France. 13 (58): 51–54. doi:10.3406/rhef.1927.2419.

=== External links ===
- (in French) Centre national des Archives de l'Église de France, L'Épiscopat francais depuis 1919, retrieved: 2016-12-24.

== Acknowledgment ==
- Goyau, Georges. "Troyes." The Catholic Encyclopedia. Vol. 15. New York: Robert Appleton Company, 1912. Retrieved: 2016-09-22. [obsolete]
