= Aeneas of Paris =

Bishop (died 870)

Aeneas of Paris (died 27 December 870) was bishop of Paris from 858 to 870. He is best known as the author of one of the controversial treatises against the Byzantines ("Greeks"), called forth by the encyclical letters of Photius. His comprehensive Liber adversus Græcos deals with the procession of the Holy Spirit, the marriage of the clergy, fasting, the consignatio infantium, the clerical tonsure, the Roman primacy, and the elevation of deacons to the see of Rome. He declares that the accusations brought by the Greeks against the Latins are "superfluous questions having more relation to secular matters than to spiritual."

The work is mainly a collection of quotations or "sentences," from Greek and Latin Church Fathers, the former translated.

In his Epistola tractoria ad Wenilonem, written about 856, Prudentius of Troyes makes his approval of the ordination of Aeneas as the new Bishop of Paris depend on the latter's subscription to four articles favouring a double predestination.
