= Manasses of Pougy =

Manassès II
- Bishop of Troyes
- Diocese: Roman Catholic Diocese of Troyes
- In office: 1181–90
- Predecessor: Matthieu
- Successor: Barthélémy

Personal details
- Born: Manassès de Pougy
- Denomination: Catholic Church
- Residence: Troyes

Manassès de Pougy (c. 1130 – 11 June 1190) was a member of a powerful family in Champagne, France, who was Bishop of Troyes from 1181 to 1190. He defended the rights of religious orders, and was a benefactor of the Troyes Cathedral.

== Early years ==
Manassès de Pougy was born in Pougy around 1130. He came from a branch of the same family as Bishop Manassès I d'Arcis, which included the counts of Arcis, Ramerupt and Pougy, the most powerful lords of the province after the Count of Champagne. He studied at the school attached to the Troyes Cathedral. He was canon of Troyes, then was made grand-archdeacon of Troyes in 1167 under Bishop Henry of Carinthia. He was probably the same as Manassès de Pougy, provost of Saint-Etienne de Troyes.

== Bishop ==
Manassès succeeded Bishop Matthieu, who died in 1180. He devoted much effort to ecclesiastical discipline, enriched the monasteries and chapters and gave to the poor. He was very generous to the Chapter of Saint-Nicolas, which his family had founded in Pougy. Pope Lucius III (c. 1100–85) confirmed his defense of the religious orders of the diocese of Troyes in the exercise of their special rights. He forbade the vicars of the parishes to bury the inhabitants of other parishes except in special circumstances. On 23 July 1188, during the Troyes Fairs, most of the buildings of the city were destroyed by a violent fire, including the cathedral and the Abbey of Notre Dame aux Nonnains. Several nuns died and all the archives were lost. Henry II, Count of Champagne (1166–97) rebuilt the abbey, and Bishop Manassès renewed the privileges of the nuns.

Manassès died in Troyes on 11 June 1190 and was buried in the Cathedral, of which he had been one of the main benefactors. He was the uncle of Ode de Pougy, abbess of Notre-Dame-aux-Nonnains from 1264 to 1272. She was known for her resistance to the construction of the Church of St Urbain.

== Sources ==
- Archives départementales de l'Aube (1873), Inventaire sommaire des Archives départementales antérieures à 1790: Aube. Archives ecclésiastiques, série G. (in French), Duféy-Robert
- Boutiot, Théophile (1870), Histoire de la ville de Troyes et de la Champagne méridionale (in French), A. Aubry
- Coffinet (1852), Société de sphragistique de Paris (in French)
- Demessmacker, Martine; Renaud, Dominique; Morin, Louis. "De l'Abbaye Notre-Dame-aux-Nonnains à la Préfecture de l'Aube" (PDF) (in French). Préfecture de l’Aube. Archived from the original (PDF) on 2015-12-22.
- Jubainville, Henry Arbois de; Pigeotte, Léon (1866), Histoire des ducs et des comtes de Champagne ...: Fin du catalogue des actes des comtes de Champagne, tables, etc. 1866 (in French), A. Durand
- Socard, Émile (1882), Biographie des personnages de Troyes et du département de l'Aube (in French), L. Lacroix
