= Prudentius of Troyes =

Bishop of Troyes

Saint Prudentius of Troyes
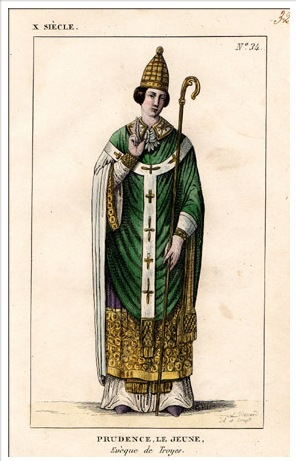
- Portrait of Prudentius, Bishop of Troyes

Bishop of Troyes
- Born: County of Aragon
- Died: 6 April 861; Troyes, West Francia
- Honored in: Anglican Communion; Catholic Church; Eastern Orthodox Church
- Feast: 6 April

Prudentius (? in County of Aragon – 6 April 861 at Troyes, West Francia) was bishop of Troyes, a chronicler and an opponent of Hincmar of Reims in the controversy on predestination.

== Life ==
Prudentius left Aragon in his youth and came to Francia, where he changed his name from Galindo to Prudentius. He was educated at the Palatine School, At the court of King Louis the Pious he took over writing the Annals of St Bertin from about 835 until his death in 861. He became Bishop of Troyes in 843.

At Troyes his feast is celebrated on 6 April as that of a saint, though the Bollandists do not recognize his cult. His works, with the exception of his poems, are printed in Migne's Patrologia Latina, CXV, 971–1458. His poems in Monumenta Germaniae Historica Poetæ Lat., II, 679 sq.

He is commemorated on 6 April in Martyrologium Romanum (2004)

== Theological views ==
In the controversy on predestination between Gottschalk of Orbais, Archbishop Hincmar of Reims, and Bishop Pardulus of Laon, he opposed Hincmar in an epistle addressed to him. In this epistle, which was written about 849, he defends a double predestination, viz., one for reward, the other for punishment, not, however, for sin. He further upholds that Christ died only for those who are actually saved.

The same opinion he defends in his De prædestinatione contra Johannem Scotum, which he wrote in 851 at the instance of Archbishop Wenilo of Sens who had sent him nineteen articles of Eriugena's work on predestination for refutation. Still it appears that at the synod of Quierzy, he subscribed to four articles of Hincmar which admit only one predestination, perhaps out of reverence for the archbishop, or out of fear of King Charles the Bald.

In his Epistola tractoria ad Wenilonem, written about 856, he again upholds his former opinion and makes his approval of the ordination of the new bishop Æneas of Paris depend on the latter's subscription to four articles favouring a double predestination. Of great historical value is his continuation of the Annales Bertiniani from 835 to 61, in which he presents a reliable history of that period of the Western Frankish Empire.

He is also the author of Vita Sanctæ Mauræ Virginis and some poems.

Hincmar of Reims wrote that Prudentius died "still scribbling away at many things that were mutually contradictory and contrary to faith."

== Notes ==
Catholic Church titles
Preceded by Adalbert	Bishop of Troyes; 845–861	Succeeded by Folcric
