= Jean de Nanteuil =

13th-century French bishop of Troyes

Jean de Nanteuil was a French bishop of Troyes from 1269 to 1295 or 1298. His brother was Thibaud de Nanteuil, cardinal of Beauvais.
