= Ode de Pougy =

Abbess of Notre Dame from 1264 to 1272

Abbess of Notre Dame aux Nonnains
- In office 1264–1272
- Preceded by: Isabelle de Chasteau-Villain
- Succeeded by: Isabelle II

Personal details
- Occupation: Abbess

Ode de Pougy (French pronunciation: [ɔd də puʒi]) was the Abbess of Notre Dame aux Nonnains in Troyes, France, from 1264 to 1272. She is known for her efforts to forcibly prevent the construction of the Church of St Urbain, Troyes, which led to her excommunication.

== Life ==
Ode de Pougy was the daughter of Regnault de Pougy (Note: A woman named Ode, wife of Regnaud de Pougy, seigneur de Saint-Valerien, was recorded as a widow in 1206. Possibly she was the abbess's mother) and niece of Manassès II (c. 1130–90), Bishop of Troyes. She came from a branch of the same family as Bishop Manassès I d'Arcis of Troyes, which included the counts of Arcis, Ramerupt and Pougy, the most powerful lords of the province of Champagne after the Count of Champagne.

Ode de Pougy was abbess of Notre Dame aux Nonnains from 1264 to 1272. She succeeded Isabelle de Chasteau-Villain, dame de Barberey-Saint-Sulpice. Isabelle had received a letter from Pope Urban IV dated 20 May 1262 in which the pope told her that he had decided to erect a church in Troyes, his birthplace, dedicated to his patron Saint Urban. He asked her to sell the house that had been occupied by his father and other adjacent properties to his chaplain Jean Garcie and his agent Thibaut d'Aunay, a citizen of Troyes, for use as a site for the new collegiate church. The abbess Isabelle was flattered by the pope's request and readily assented.

Urban IV died in Perugia on 2 October 1264 but his nephew Ancher, cardinal of Sainte-Praxède, continued with the building project. Pope Clement IV placed the new foundation directly under the protection of the Holy See. The Abbey of Notre Dame aux Nonnains had great power and privileges in Troyes. A collegiate church that would be outside its jurisdiction and directly under the Holy See was a serious threat. In 1266, when the date on which Saint-Urbain would be consecrated had already been decided, Ode de Pougy sent a gang to the site that destroyed as much as possible. The doors were broken off, the high altar and capitals broken, the columns vandalized and the carpenters' tools and material confiscated. After this attack new doors were installed, but these were also broken and removed soon after. A few months later a suspicious fire broke out that destroyed the wooden parts of the walls and the roof.

Clement sent the Archbishop of Tyre to dedicate the church and bless the cemetery of Saint-Urbain. Ode de Pougy considered the delegation of the archbishop was an affront to her jurisdiction. In 1268 the nuns hired armed men who prevented the Archbishop of Tyre and the Bishop of Auxerre from blessing the new cemetery. At the time of the ceremony Ode de Pougy went to the church with her nuns, household retainers and twenty eight devoted followers and violently disrupted the proceedings. The prelate was driven out of the church and into the road. When the pope heard of the scandal he launched an investigation by the archdeacon of Luxeuil and the dean of Saint-Étienne de Troyes. In March 1269 the pope excommunicated the abbess and several associates who had assisted her. Ode de Pougy was succeeded in 1272 by Isabelle II. Pope Martin IV lifted the excommunication in 1283.

== Sources ==
- Boutiot, Théophile (1870), Histoire de la ville de Troyes et de la Champagne méridionale (in French), A. Aubry
- Coffinet (1852), Sceau de l'abbaye de Notre-Dame-aux-Nonnains de Troyes (douzième siècle) (in French), on souscrit chez M. A. Forgeais
- Kane, Tina (2010), The Troyes Memoire: The Making of a Medieval Tapestry, Boydell & Brewer, ISBN 978-1-84383-570-7
- Petit, Ernest (1874), "Les Sires de Noyers", Bulletin de la Société des Sciences Historiques et Naturelles de L'Yonne (in French)
- Rivière, Rémi (2001), Basilique Saint-Urbain, Troyes : Guide de visite (in French), Roy, Dominique, photography, p. 64, ISBN 2-907894-26-9
- Socard, Émile (1882), Biographie des personnages de Troyes et du département de l'Aube (in French), L. Lacroix
- Société de Sphragistique (1852), Catalogue des Abbesses de Notre-Dame-aux-Nonnains (in French), Siège de la societé

Catholic Church titles
Preceded by Isabelle de Chasteau-Villain	Abbess of Notre Dame aux Nonnains; 1264–1272	Succeeded by Isabelle
