= Hugh II (abbot of Lagny) =

French knight and Benedictine monk

Abbot Hugh, Abbot of Lagny
- Born: Hugh
- Died: 1171; Lagny Abbey
- Occupations: knight, monk
- Years active: 1136-1177
- Parent: Theobald II, Count of Champagne
- Relatives: Henry I, Count of Champagne, Adela, Queen of France and Cardinal William of the White Hands (half-siblings); Stephen, King of England and Henry of Blois, Bishop of Winchester (uncles); Henry de Sully, Abbot of Fécamp (first cousin).

Ecclesiastical career
- Religion: Catholic
- Congregations: Monk of Tiron Abbey
- Offices held: Abbot of St Benet's Abbey, Holme, Norfolk; Abbot of Chertsey, Surrey; Abbot of Lagny

Hugh (died 1171) was a French knight and Benedictine monk, abbot of monasteries in England and France.

== Background ==
He was an illegitimate son of Theobald II, Count of Champagne (1090-1152), sometimes known as Theobald the Great. His father was Count of Blois and of Chartres as Theobald IV from 1102; and Count of Champagne and of Brie as Theobald II from 1125. He was a skilled administrator of his territories, who had at least ten surviving children by his wife, Matilda of Carinthia, daughter of Engelbert, Duke of Carinthia. In addition he had Hugh, of an unknown woman.

His birth in any case made Hugh a half-brother of Count Henry I of Champagne who was married to Marie, elder daughter of King Louis VII of France. Hugh's half-sister was Adela, Queen of France, the consort of Louis VII, mother of King Philip II of France and of the later Empress of Byzantium, Agnes. Hugh was also half-brother to Cardinal William, Archbishop of Sens and then of Rheims and the first cousin of Henry de Sully, Abbot of Fécamp. More importantly, he was also a nephew of King Stephen of England and of the King's brother Henry of Blois of Blois, Bishop of Winchester.

== Early life ==
Against the background of this clan, Hugh, described at the time as noble, manly and energetic in his bearing, became a knight. He was wounded in battle about 1136. Cared for at Tiron Abbey in France, once recovered he decided to become a monk there.

== Abbot of St Benet's, Holme ==
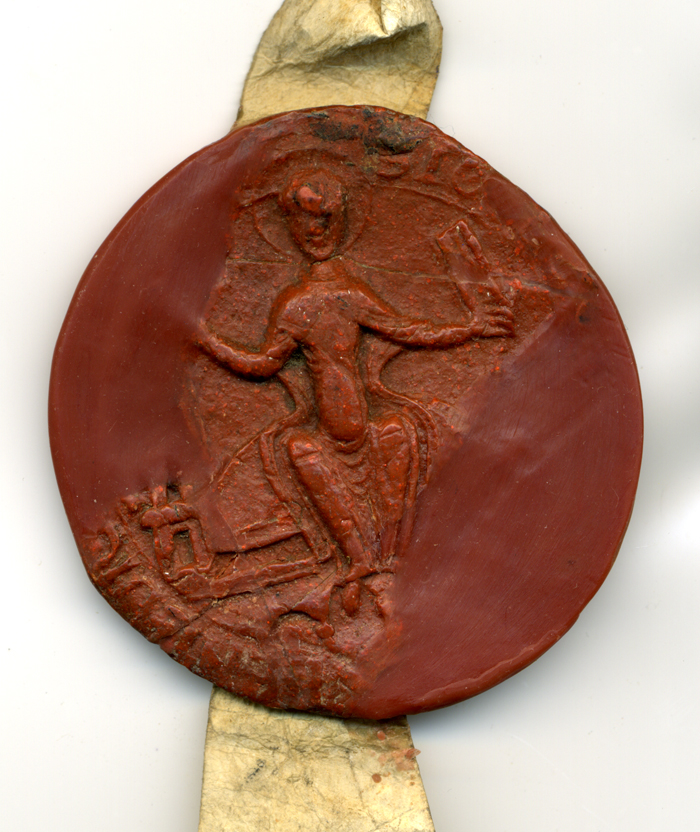
Seal of St Benet's Abbey in 1534

Later (1146-1150) Hugh served as abbot of St Benet's Abbey, situated at Holme or Hulme, on the River Bure within the Broads in Norfolk, England. The monastery had existed in Anglo-Saxon times and received benefactions of land from King Canute. At the same time, c. 1022, Canute appears to have endowed another Benedictine monastery that was later Bury St Edmunds Abbey, and in this operation, half of the monks of St Benet's moved to their sister monastery, taking with them half of all the furniture, books, sacred vestments and other worship items belonging to St Benet's. In 1065 St Benet's established a cell, later Rumburgh Priory in Suffolk. After the Conquest, from 1089 the abbots were Norman or Anglo-Norman.

Hugh owed this first appointment as abbot to one or other of uncles, King Stephen of England or the King's brother Henry of Blois, Bishop of Winchester. King Stephen (or Henry of Blois), the appointment receiving papal confirmation in 1147. To secure this post for Hugh, the previous abbot, Daniel, was deposed. The story in John of Oxnead's Chronicle is that Hugh was a capable and serious abbot but made powerful enemies who framed him by having a woman slipped into his bed and then sent armed men to punish the supposed crime by castrating him. He had been one of three unsuccessful candidates, all relatives of the King, for the see of Lincoln in 1148.

== Abbot of Chertsey ==
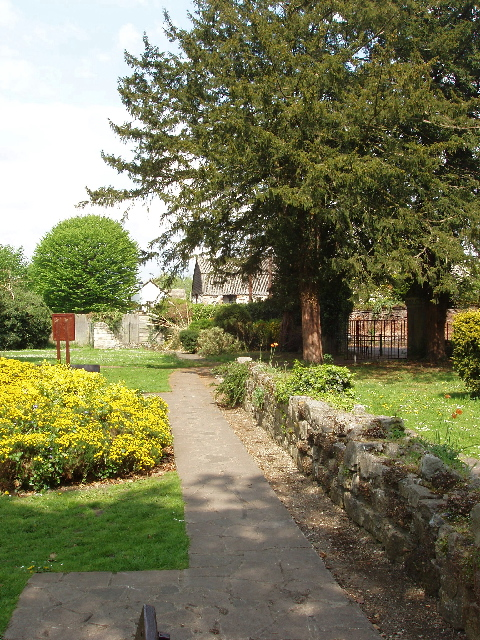
Ruined wall of Chertsey Abbey

After the violence, John of Oxnead says, Hugh's uncle King Stephen obtained for him the post of abbot of Chertsey Abbey (1149-1163) in Surrey. While at St Benet's Hugh's predecessor Abbot Daniel returned to his post, in Chertsey, to make way for Hugh, again the sitting abbot was deposed, the proceeding again receiving papal confirmation.

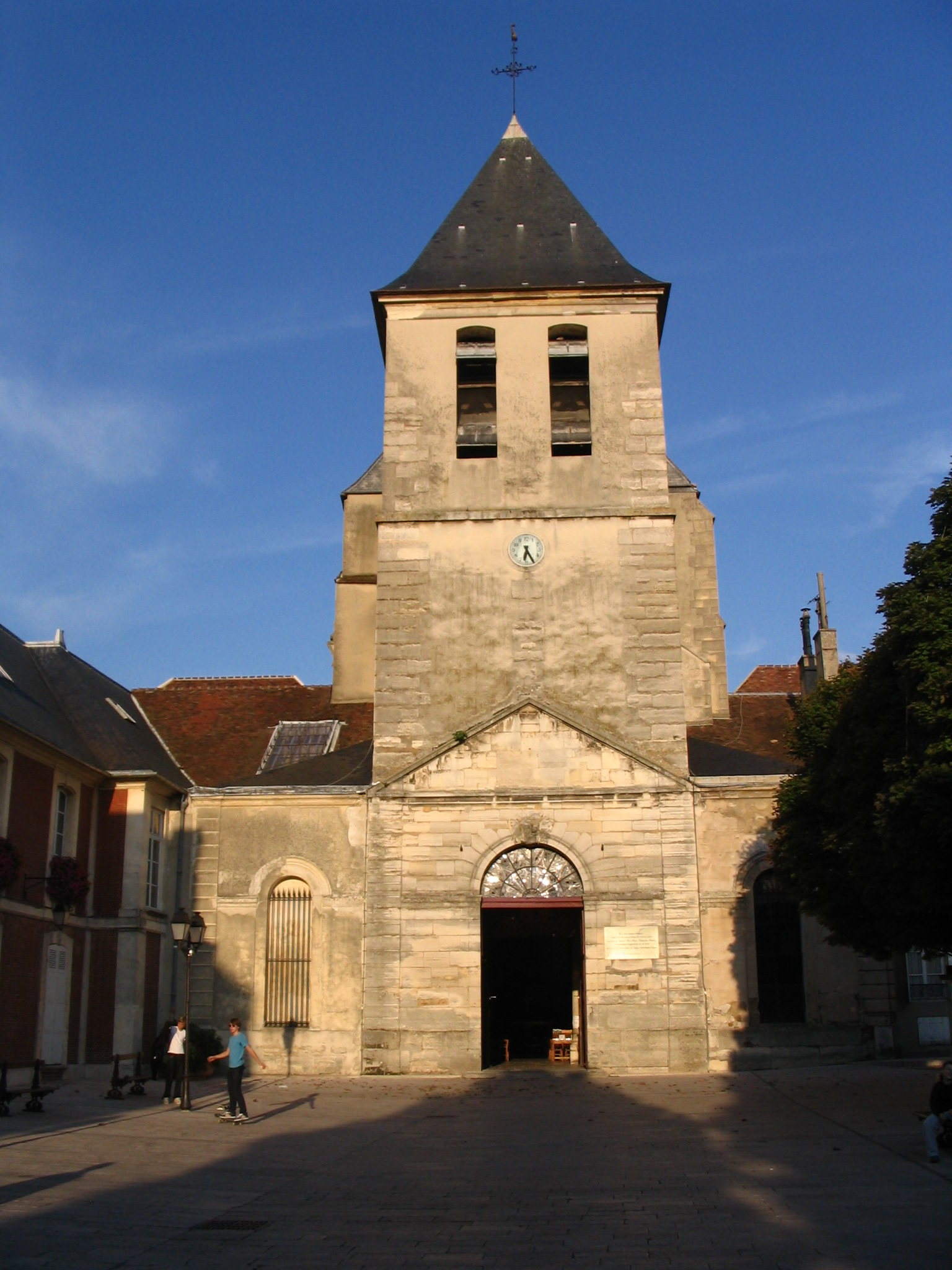
Abbey Church at Lagny

== Abbot of Lagny ==
With the death of King Stephen and the succession of Henry II, the climate in England became hostile for the family. Bishop Henry of Blois decamped from England with his treasure in 1155. Hugh followed the trend and returned to Champagne and became once more a monk of Tiron but when trouble arose at Lagny Abbey, he was made abbot there with the help of his half-brother, Count Henry I of Champagne, the son-in-law of King Louis VII of France. This monastery was already the burial place of his father (since 1152) and of numerous other members of his large family. It was also a shrine of the relics of a member of the family, Saint Theobald of Provins, who had died a Camaldolese monk in 1066 and was canonized in 1073 by Pope Alexander II.

It is reported that Hugh was an active Abbot of Lagny but for some reason was deposed in 1171 and died that year, being buried at the abbey.
