= St Benet's Abbey =

Medieval monastery in Norfolk, England

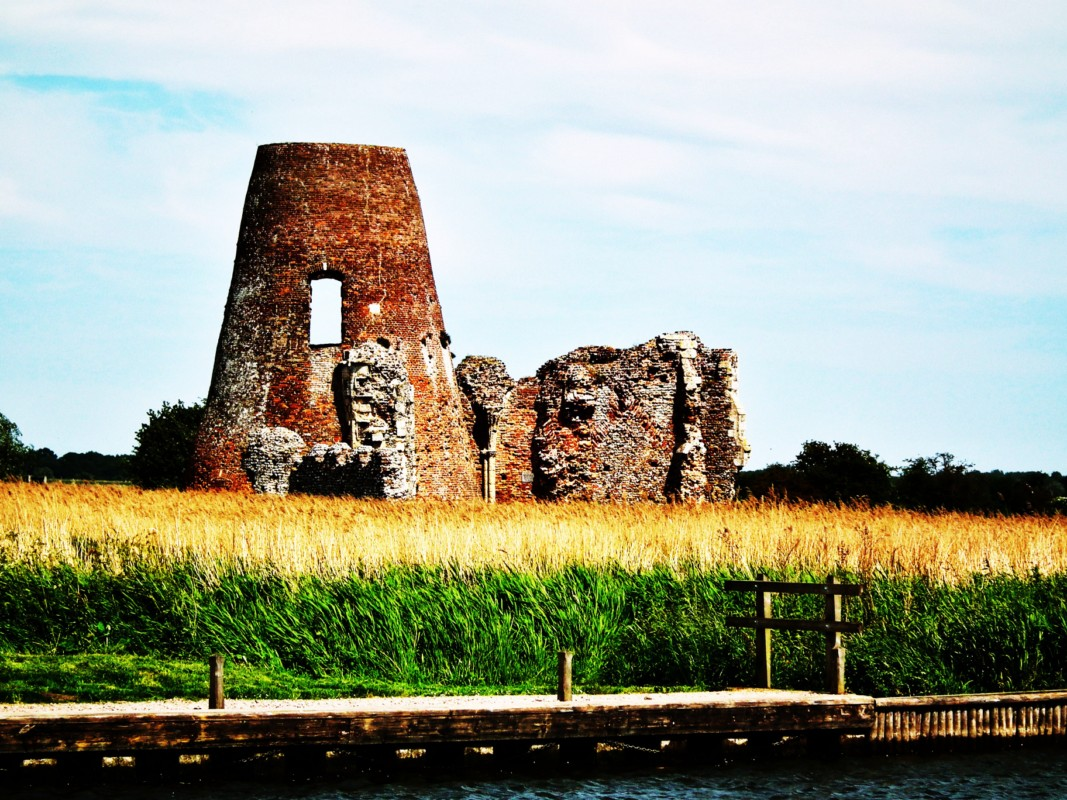
- St Benet's Abbey and wharf from the River Bure, in front of a ruined windmill

- Location within Norfolk

Monastery information
- Other names: St Benet's Abbey, Holme
- Order: Order of St Benedict
- Established: 9th century
- Diocese: Norwich

People
- Important associated figures: Saint Suneman; Saint Wulfric; Abbot Elsinus; Abbot Aelfwold; King Canute; John of Oxnead; Conrad, prior of Christ Church Cathedral Priory, Canterbury; Hugh, abbot of Lagny; Sir John Fastolf; Bishop William Rugg

Site
- Location: Ludham, Norfolk, England
- Coordinates: 52.6864°N 1.5247°E
- Visible remains: gatehouse, lower walls of sanctuary and earthworks
- Public access: yes
- Other information: Property of Norfolk Archaeological Trust, Diocese of Norwich

St Benet's Abbey, also known as St Benet's at Holme or St Benet Hulme, was a medieval monastery of the Order of Saint Benedict situated at Cow Holm in Horning, Norfolk, England. It lay on the River Bure within the Broads. St Benet is a medieval English version of the name of St Benedict of Nursia, hailed as the founder of western monasticism. At the period of the Dissolution of the Monasteries the abbey's possessions were in effect seized by the crown and assigned to the diocese of Norwich. Though the monastery was supposed to continue as a community, within a few years at least the monks had dispersed. Today there remain only ruins.

== The Abbey in Anglo-Saxon times ==
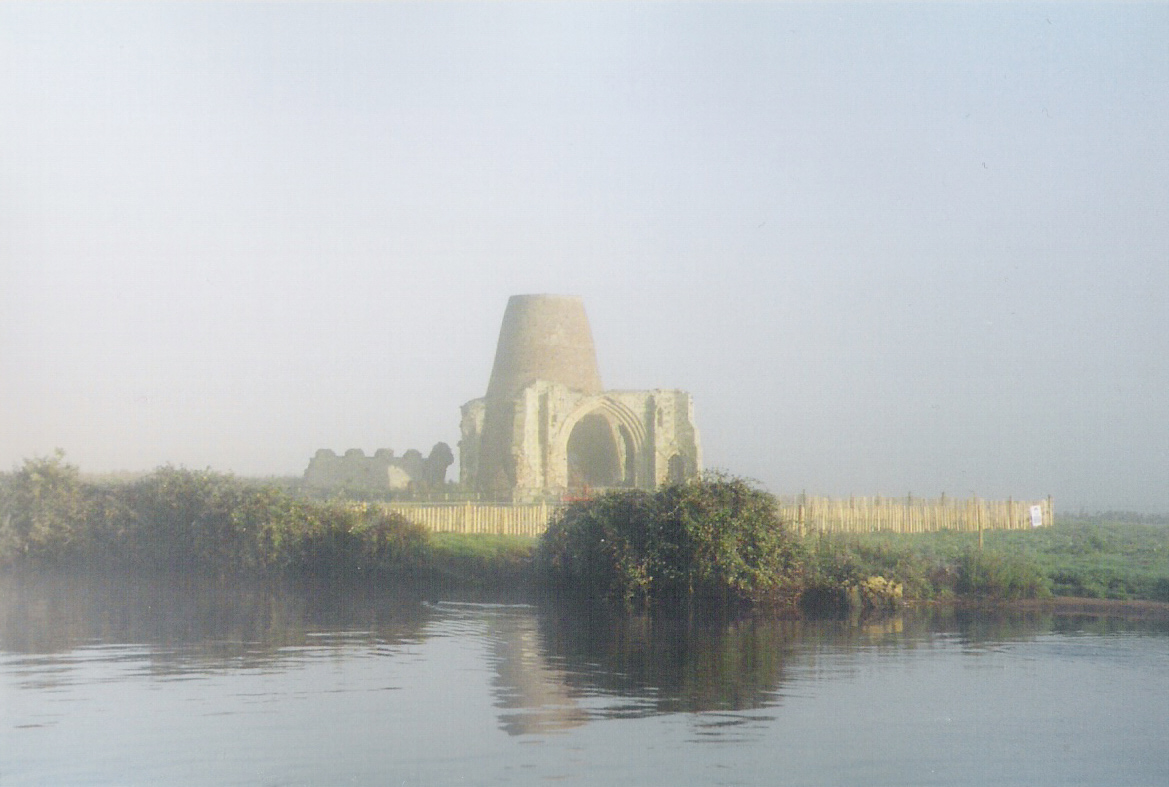
Gatehouse of St Benet's Abbey in the early morning mist, October 2004. The conical structure is the remains of the later windmill built inside it

The early history of the monastery has to be told tentatively since it is difficult to reconcile the surviving sources with what is known of the bigger picture of the development of the area. It is said that St Benet's was founded on the site of a 9th-century monastery where the hermit Suneman was martyred by the Danes. About the end of the 10th century it was rebuilt by one Wulfric. A generation later, c. 1022, King Canute conferred on it his manors of Horning, Ludham and Neatishead.

Canute appears to have endowed at the same time another Benedictine monastery that was later Bury St Edmunds Abbey, at Beodricsworth, afterwards known as St Edmundsbury, where since the early 10th century, the relics of the martyred king, St Edmund had been venerated. With this new endowment, under the auspices of the Bishop of Elmham, the original community was reinforced or replaced by a party consisting of half of the monks of St Benet's Abbey under Prior Uvius or Ufi. They arrived bearing half of all the furniture, books, sacred vestments and other worship items belonging to St Benet's. Ufi became Bury's first abbot and governed until his death in 1043. He was blessed as abbot by the Bishop of London. His successor (1044–1065) was Leofstan, another of the former St Benet's monks.

Other early benefactors of St Benet's included Earl Ralf II of East Anglia and Edith Swannesha, concubine to Harold II.

In 1065 St Benet's Abbey was in good enough condition to establish a cell, later Rumburgh Priory in Suffolk. However, towards the end of the 12th century this became a dependency of St Mary's Abbey in York. This happened by means of a gift made by the patron, who was either Stephen of Penthièvre, Count of Tréguier, Lord of Richmond or his son Alan of Penthièvre, Earl of Richmond and Cornwall.

It was the first abbot of St Benet's Abbey, Elsinus, who procured stone to replace the wooden structure of the abbey's church. This must have been a notable operation since suitable stone does not occur in the vicinity. The work was completed by the second abbot, Thurstan, who when he died in 1064 is reported to have been buried before the altar in the chapel of St Michael within the abbey church.

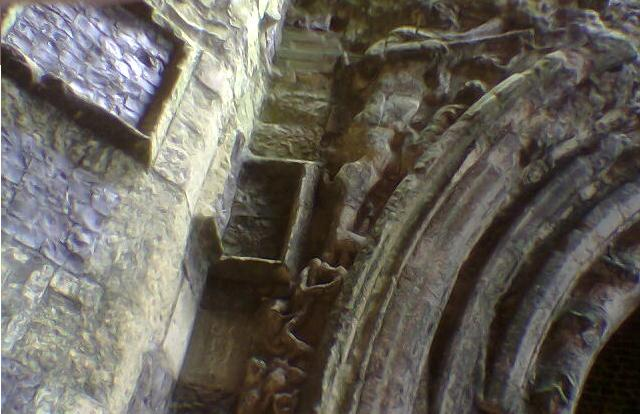
Carving detail around gate

At the time of the Norman Conquest of England, King Harold Godwinson put the abbot of St Benet's, in charge of defending the East Anglian coast against invasion. The involvement with military naval matters was naturally incumbent upon the abbot, as upon bishops and monastic superiors throughout England, in so far as he was a prominent public personage and landowner in the area and hence an integral element in the feudal system. The abbey was responsible for organizing a shipsoke or grouping of several hundreds which then had the obligation of providing a fighting ship. It is possible that the abbey did in fact provide the King Harold's ship.

== The Abbey after the Conquest ==
After the Conquest, William the Conqueror pursued those seen as having supported the defeated Harold and Abbot Aelfwold was outlawed and exiled for a time to Denmark, and the abbey's estates suffered encroachments by neighbouring landowners and a general campaign of systematic harassment by the tenants of the upcoming Norman magnate Sir Roger Bigod, whom the Domesday Book gives as holding 187 lordships in Norfolk and another 117 in Suffolk. The harassment was to continue for a long period of time. In the reign of Henry II (1154–1189) the church at Ranworth, which was the property of the abbey, was stolen bodily, and being a timber building, was dismantled and spirited away. It took a command from the King to have it returned.

John of Oxnead (de Oxenedes), a 13th-century monk of St Benet's, says in his Chronicle that Abbot Aelfwold was later able to return and resume his post, dying at the abbey as abbot on 14 November 1089. He was succeeded as abbot by Ralph, and Ralph in 1101 by Richard, who is credited with having completed the church's western tower and with having hung two large bells there.

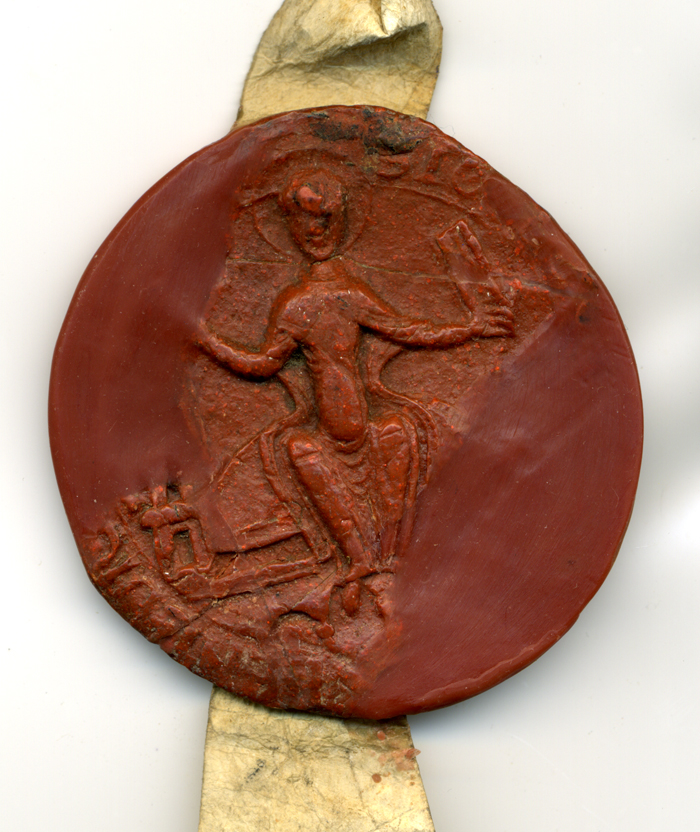
Seal of St Benet's Abbey in 1534, as appended to the acceptance of the Act of Supremacy

The site was not immune to natural disasters and in the 13th and 14th centuries there were incidents where violent storms on the coast forced the sea to break through the dunes, causing damage to the abbey. In 1287 to save the horses, they had to be brought from the stables to shelter on higher land in the nave of the church. The abbey also remained vulnerable to hostile incursions by water and in 1327 by royal licence the site was enclosed by a wall with battlements, isolated traces of which still survive.

Surviving records from the 12th century show that at least some of the abbey's tenants paid their rents in kind or by means of service rendered. At Swanton Abbott the lease for a mill and a piece of land were four fat cocks a year, land at Potter Heigham was paid each year with a supply of beer for the monks, another stretch of land at Banningham was rented for eight measures of honey and a property in London for a pound of pepper and a pound of cummin, while two churches, one at Stalham and one in Norwich had to present the abbey annually with a pound of incense each.

== Abbots with connections ==
That the abbey continued to have connections to the court may be shown by the fact that the man who became abbot in 1126 was Conrad, who has been identified with the monk who till then had been prior of Christ Church Cathedral Priory, Canterbury, and who had been confessor to King Henry I. Conrad is said to have brought with him two chasubles and a book that had been the property of St Dunstan, Archbishop of Canterbury, together with a chalice Dunstan himself had made. These objects were conserved at St Benet's as relics.

Later that same century another abbot with even stronger connections to power arrived to govern St Benet's. Hugh was an illegimitate half-brother to Cardinal William of the White Hands and to Count Henry I of Champagne who was married to Marie, elder daughter of King Louis VII of France. Hugh's half-sister was Adela, Queen of France and he was a nephew of King Stephen of England and of the King's brother Henry of Blois Henry of Blois, Bishop of Winchester.

Hugh became a knight and was wounded in battle about 1136. Cared for at Tiron Abbey in France, when he recovered he decided to become a monk there. Later he was made abbot of St Benet's (1146–1150) thanks to his uncle King Stephen (or Henry of Blois), the appointment receiving papal confirmation in 1147. To secure this post for Hugh, the previous abbot, Daniel, was deposed.

The story in John of Oxnead's Chronicle is that he was a capable and serious abbot but made powerful enemies who framed him by having a woman slipped into his bed and then sent armed men to punish the supposed crime by castrating him. After the violence, John of Oxnead says, Hugh's uncle King Stephen obtained for him the post of abbot of Chertsey Abbey (1149–1163) in Surrey and at St Benet's Abbot Daniel returned to his post. Subsequently, the death of King Stephen lead to a hostile climate in England for the family and Henry of Blois fled from England in 1155. Hugh followed, returning to Champagne and becoming once more a monk of Tiron Abbey. However, when trouble arose at Lagny Abbey, he was made abbot there (1163–1171). Though an active abbot, for some reason was deposed in 1171 and died shortly afterwards, being buried at the abbey.

== Local cults ==
Despite elements of success, both material and spiritual, the abbey may have struggled to compete in religious prestige, lacking as it did the relics of an important saint. It seems that alongside a circumscribed veneration for the memory of the hermit Wulfric or Wulfey, who was said to have occupied the site before the abbey's foundation, in the 12-13th centuries the abbey tried to promote the cult of St Margaret of Holm, supposedly a girl killed in the woods at Hoveton St John on 22 May 1170, but this made little or no progress.

== Benefactions ==
The abbey's life had substantially begun with benefactions and despite attempts both surreptitious and aggressive to snatch them away, the benefactions continued. It has been suggested that participation in 1075 of an early patron, Ralph Guader, Earl of East Anglia, in the failed Revolt of the Earls against William the Conqueror and his subsequent flight to Brittany may have caused later patrons to divert their benefactions to other monasteries. Nevertheless, benefactions there were, to the points that by the late 13th century St Benet's had property in 76 parishes.

One of the abbey's great benefactors was Sir John Fastolf, the inspiration for Shakespeare's Falstaff, who died at Caister and was buried at St Benet's in December 1459, next to his wife Millicent in a new aisle built by Fastolf himself on the south side of the abbey church. The bulk of his fortune passed to Magdalen College, Oxford, but his intention to establish a chantry at Caister Castle did not materialize.

== Later ownership ==
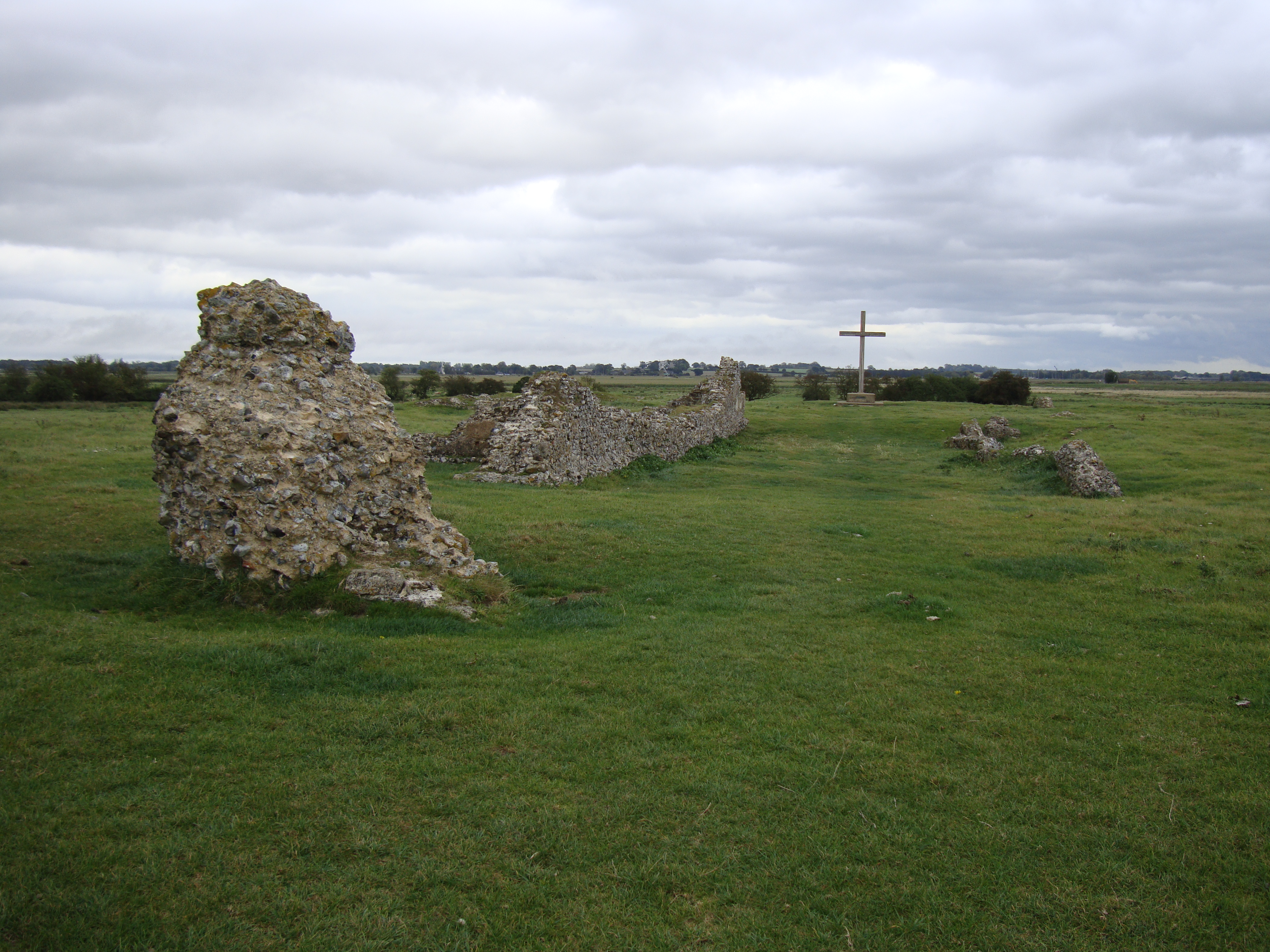
Remains of the abbey church nave, looking toward the high altar

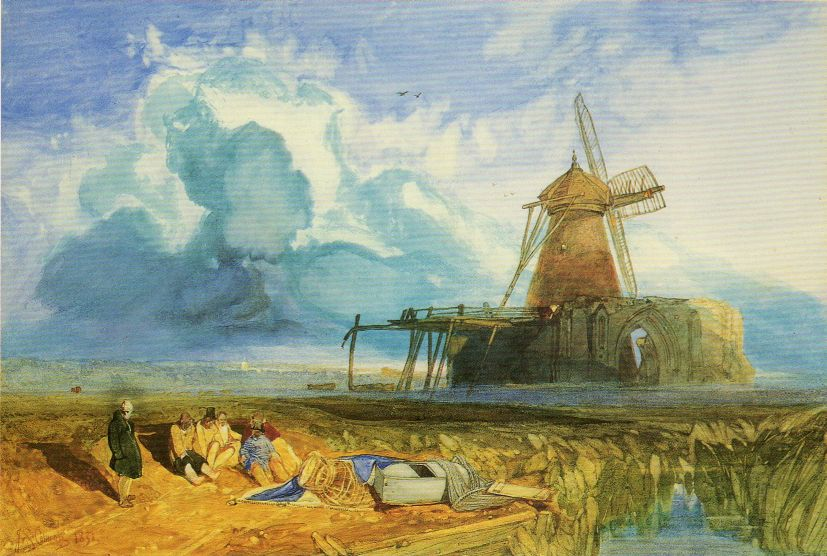
St Benet's Abbey Windmill, 1831. Painting by John Sell Cotman.

After the Dissolution the greater part of the buildings at the site were demolished, with the exclusion of the gatehouse, which is now a Grade I listed building.

In the second half of the 18th century, a farmer built a windmill, later converted to a windpump, inside the abbey gatehouse, removing the second floor of the gatehouse in the process.

From the early 18th century, active attention was paid to drainage of the marshland around the site. From various surviving illustrations, it appears that a first windmill-powered land drainage was erected around the middle of the 18th century, and some decades later was replaced by another, attached to the front of the ruined gatehouse. By at least 1813, to facilitate movement of the windmill sails the upper floor of the gatehouse was removed to provide room for the sails to turn. The sails survived until at least 1854 but had been destroyed by 1863.

The wind-powered mechanism, which at time ceased operating and is itself now a ruin, is a grade II* listed building.

Between 1782 and 1886 just along the river from the gatehouse there was a wherryman's riverside pub called The Chequers.

In 1925 the site became one of Britain's first scheduled ancient monuments.

In 1993 the main part of the site was bought by the Crown Estate and in 2002 sold to the Norfolk Archaeological Trust which in 2004 purchased the gatehouse and mill from the Diocese of Norwich. The ruins of the church remain the property of the diocese, which has leased them to the Trust for 199 years. In recent years essential conservation repairs have been carried out on the ruins and visits to the site have been facilitated by the laying out of a new car park and access paths, while large numbers of volunteers undertook graffiti recording, molehill and wildlife surveys, and maintenance and provided guides. Aside from several scientific studies, the site has become the focus of intense local interest.

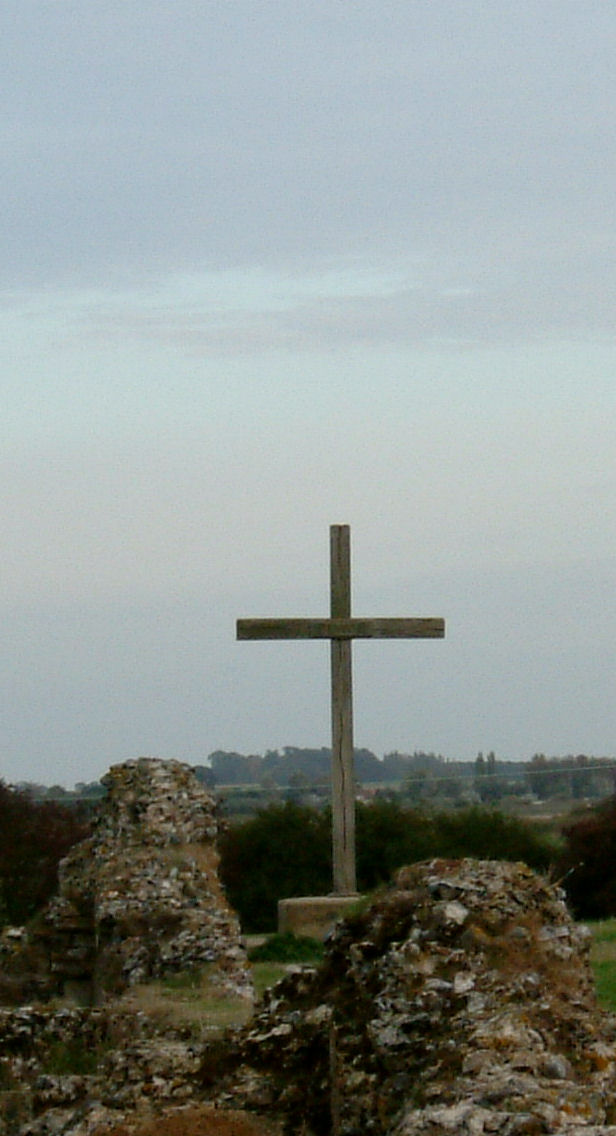
The modern cross at the high altar of the St Benet's Abbey ruins

On 2 August 1987 a cross made from oak from the royal estate at Sandringham - the Cross of Peace - was erected on the high altar.

== List of Abbots ==
The years listed are election dates.

Year	Names
	Wulfric
1020s	Aelfsige
1046	Thurstan de Ludham
1064	Aelfwold
1089	Ralph
1101	Richard
1126	Conrad
1128	William Basset
1133	Anselm
1140	Daniel
c. 1150	Hugh
1151	Daniel (reinstated)
1153	William
1168	Thomas
1186	Ralph
1210	John
1214	Reginald
1229	Sampson
1237	Robert de Thorkeseye
1251	William de Ringfeld
1256	Adam de Neatishead
1268	Richard de Bukenham
1275	Nicholas de Walsham
1302	Henry de Broke
1326	John de Aylsham
1347	Robert de Aylsham
1349	William de Hadesco
1365	William de Methelwold
1395	Robert de Sancta Fide
1395	Simon de Brigham
1411	Richard de South Walsham
1439	John Marte
1439	John Kelyng
1470	Thomas Pakefield
1492	Robert Cubitt
1505	William Forest
1510	John Redinge
1517	John Salcot, alias Capon
1530	William Repps or Rugg

== Post-Reformation Abbot, Prior and Lay Monks of St Benet-at-Holme ==
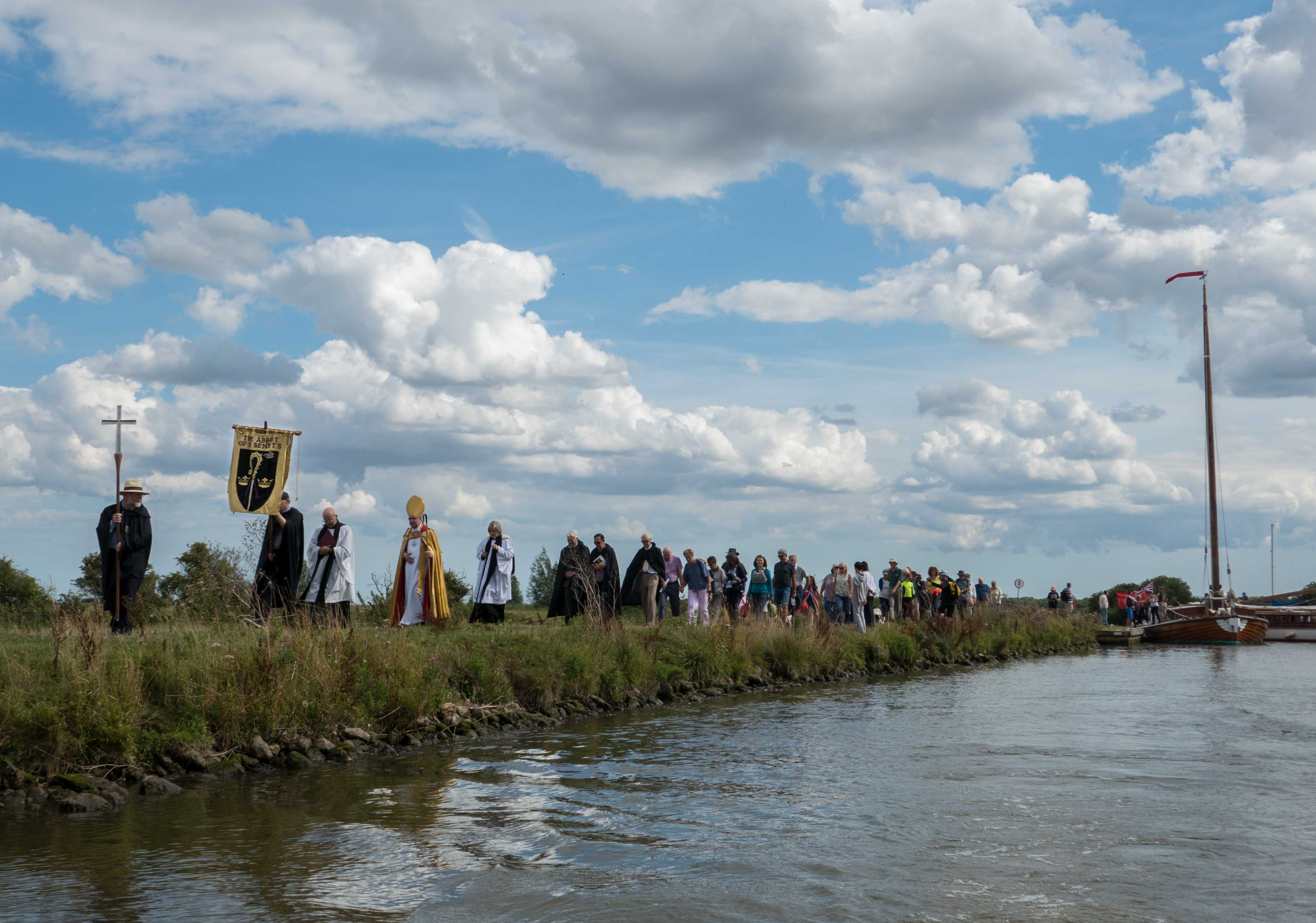
The Bishop of Norwich arrives by wherry at St Benet's for the 2017 annual service

During the Dissolution of the Monasteries the Vicar General was said to have noted the poverty in which the brothers of St Benet-at-Home committed to live in by contrast to the opulence of the Bishop of Norwich. It is unclear whether this was a deliberate choice to uphold principles of monastic asceticism or due to the high levels of debt the monastery was said to be in. Holding the abbey up as an example of Protestant monasticism during the Reformation, Thomas Cromwell persuaded Henry VIII to spare the abbey, and unite it into the newly founded Church of England, and to elevate the Abbot of St-Benet's to the Bishops cathedra uniting the two roles. It thus became the sole abbey spared during the dissolution, and was protected in statute by an extraordinary act of parliament in 1536. The act stipulated that the Abbot be permitted to forever maintain a Prior and twelve monks at the abbey. This makes it arguably the oldest Anglican Order of St Benedict in England.

By 1545 however the abbey had collapsed and the brothers had to abandon the site. The lands were leased to a succession of local farmers to pay down the debts. As the Bishops were enrobed amongst the Lords Spiritual, the power that prior to the dissolution came with being an abbot was eroded, and successive Bishops of Norwich saw little point in using the title. However, since 1939 Bishops of Norwich have once again used the title of Abbot of St Benet's reaffirming their historic role. The Bishop in their role as Abbot appoints a local vicar as Prior of St Benet-at-Holme, who in turn appoints 12 lay monks to assist with his role. Every year on the first Sunday of August the Bishop of Norwich, in their role as Abbot, arrives at St Benet's standing in the bow of a wherry, to meet pilgrims, and preach an annual service amongst the ruins of the abbey. The service takes place at the altar beneath the cross. The service follows an Anglican interpretation of the rule of Saint Benedict.

== The Abbey today ==
Today, the site at St Benet's Abbey is managed by the Norfolk Archaeological Trust. The grounds are accessible by the public and are a popular spot for walkers, ramblers and photographers to visit, with information signs present detailing the history of the Abbey. There is good foot access at the site, including around the original arched ruins, windpump tower and over to the 'Cross of Peace' located at the high altar. Vehicular and foot access is possible from St Benet's Road, with a small free car-park available for visitors to use.

The Abbey also has free moorings nearby, allowing access by boat and providing a popular location for anglers to fish from the banks.

St Benet's is still in-use today, with an annual service by the Bishop of Norwich - who arrives by boat - taking place each August.

== See also ==
- Chronica Johannis de Oxenedes, written at the abbey c. 1290
