= Adela of Champagne =

Queen of the Franks from 1160 to 1180

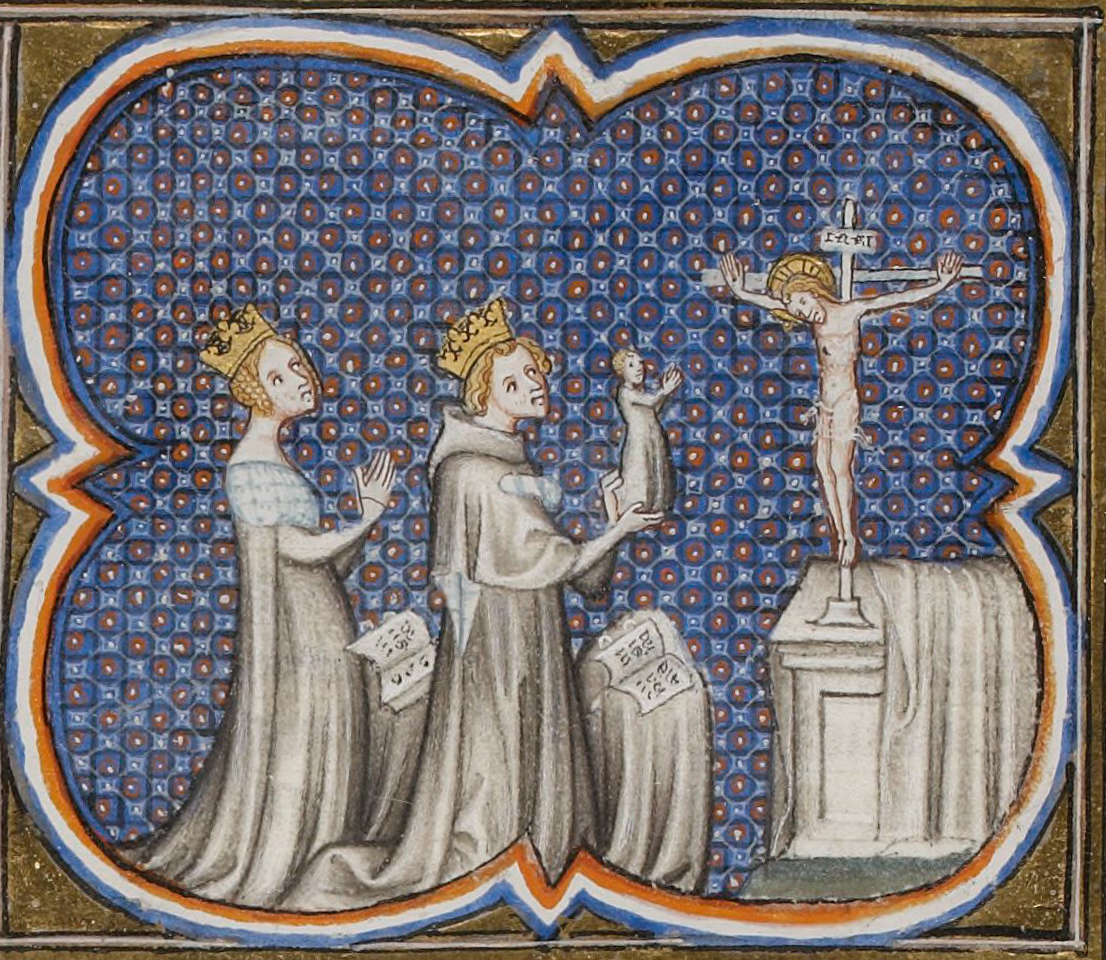
- Adela with Louis VII and Philip II

Queen consort of the Franks
- Tenure: 13 November 1160 – 18 September 1180

Regent of France
- Regency: 1190–1191
- Monarch: Philip II
- Co-regent: William of the White Hands
- Born: c. 1140; Blois, France
- Died: 4 June 1206 (aged 65–66); Paris, France
- Spouse: Louis VII of France (m. 1160; died 1180)
- Issue: Philip II of France; Agnes, Byzantine Empress
- House: House of Blois; House of Blois-Champagne
- Father: Theobald II, Count of Champagne
- Mother: Matilda of Carinthia

Adela of Champagne (French: Adèle; c. 1140 – 4 June 1206), also known as Adelaide, Alix and Adela of Blois, was Queen of France as the third wife of Louis VII. She was regent of France from 1190 to 1191 while her son Philip II participated in the Third Crusade.

== Early life ==
Adela was the third child and first daughter of Theobald II, Count of Champagne and Matilda of Carinthia, and had nine brothers and sisters. She was named after her paternal grandmother Adela of Normandy. When Louis VII's second wife, Constance of Castile, died in childbirth in 1160, he was devastated and became convinced that he would die young as well, fearing that the country would fall into chaos as he had no male heir. As he was desperate for a son, King Louis married 20-year-old Adela of Champagne five weeks later, on 13 November 1160. Adela's coronation was held the same day. She went on to give birth to Louis VII's only son, Philip II, and to the future Byzantine empress Agnes.

== Queenship ==
The marriage between Adela and Louis VII served as a peace treaty between King Louis and one of his most rebellious vassals, Theobald II of Champagne, a powerful feudal lord who died in 1152. At the time of the marriage, the king was still mourning the death of his Spanish wife. This grief was very public on the part of the king, but Adela was praised greatly for conquering his heart "bit by bit". It took five years for Adela to give birth to Louis VII's only son, the future Philip Augustus, also called Philip "Dieu-Donne" or "God-given" because his birth was long-awaited by a kingdom that had enjoyed a long unbroken lineage of undisputed male heirs to the throne. Philip's birth meant the continuing rule of Capetian monarchs in France.

Adela was active in the political life of the kingdom, along with her brothers Henry I, Theobald V, and William of the White Hands. Henry and Theobald were married to daughters of Louis VII and his first wife, Eleanor of Aquitaine. Adela and her brothers kept their political power base after the succession of her son to the throne in September 1180. She initially attempted to assume regency in a potential minor regency, as her son the king was only fifteen years old, but as he was deemed to be old enough to rule on his own, she did not succeed.

== Widowhood ==
Adela and her brothers, Henry I of Champagne, Theobald V of Blois, Stephen I of Sancerre, and William White Hands, felt their position threatened when the heiress of Artois, Isabella of Hainault, married Adela's son Philip in April 1180. Adela formed an alliance with Hugh III of Burgundy and Philip I of Flanders, and even tried to interest Emperor Frederick Barbarossa. War broke out in 1181, and relations became so bad that Philip attempted to divorce Isabella in 1184. He called a council at Sens for the purpose of repudiating her. According to Gislebert of Mons, Isabella then appeared barefooted and dressed as a penitent in the town's churches to gain public support, which convinced Philip to change his mind. He gradually developed genuine respect and love for Isabella and was devastated by her early death in March 1190.

Philip appointed Adela as regent of France several months later before he left the country on the Third Crusade. She acted as regent for her son together with the arch bishop of Reims from the departure of her son in 1190 until his return in 1191. She participated in the founding of many abbeys.

Queen Adela died on 4 June 1206 in Paris and was buried in the church of Pontigny Abbey near Auxerre. Upon learning of her death, Philip reportedly refused to speak to anyone for two days afterwards.

== Sources ==
- Bradbury, Jim (2007). The Capetians: Kings of France, 987–1328. Hambledon Continuum.
- Gaposchkin, M. Cecilia; Field, Sean L., eds. (2022). The Deeds of Philip Augustus: An English Translation of Rigord's Gesta Philippi Augusti. Translated by Field, Larry F. Cornell University Press.
- Setton, Kenneth M., ed. (1969). A History of the Crusades. Vol. II: The Later Crusades, 1189–1311. The University of Wisconsin Press.
- Thompson, Kathleen (2002). Power and Border Lordship in Medieval France: The County of the Perche, 1000–1226. The Boydell Press.
- Henry Gardiner Adams, ed. (1857). "Alice". A Cyclopaedia of Female Biography. Groomsbridge and Sons. p. 30.

French royalty
Preceded by Constance of Castile	Queen consort of France; 1164–1180	Succeeded by Isabella of Hainault
