= Marie of Blois =

Marie of Blois may refer to:

- Marie of Blois, Duchess of Burgundy (1128–1190)
- Marie I, Countess of Boulogne (1136–1182)
- Mary, Countess of Blois (1200–1241)
- Marie of Blois, Duchess of Anjou (1345–1404)

== See also ==
- Marie of Champagne
