= Theobald IV =

Theobald IV may refer to:

- Theobald IV of Blois (1090–1152)
- Theobald IV of Champagne (1201–1253)
