= Stephen I of Sancerre =

Count of Sancerre from 1151 to 1190

Stephen I (1133–1190), Count of Sancerre (1151–1190), inherited Sancerre on his father's death. His elder brothers Henry Ι and Theobald V received Champagne and Blois. His holdings were the smallest among the brothers (although William, the youngest, received no land and entered the church instead).

== Biography ==
Born in 1133, Stephen was the third son of Count Theobald II of Champagne and Matilda of Carinthia.

=== Travel to Jerusalem ===
In 1169, a delegation led by Archbishop Frederick de la Roche arrived in France to seek a husband for Sibylla, the daughter of King Amalric of Jerusalem. Stephen accepted the offer and traveled east with Duke Hugh III of Burgundy in 1170. He brought with him the monies raised by King Louis VII's tax of 1166, which had been levied for four or five years.

Since it was anticipated that Stephen might someday be king in right of his wife—Amalric's only son, Baldwin, was suspected of having leprosy—the High Court of Jerusalem invited Stephen to decide the case of the division of the estate of the sonless Henry the Buffalo among his three daughters. Stephen divided it up equally, but ordered the younger two to do homage to the eldest. After several months in the Holy Land, Stephen refused to marry Sibylla and returned home.

=== Return to France ===
Stephen built a six-towered castle on the local hill and strengthened the fortifications of the town of Sancerre itself. In 1153, he married the daughter of Godfrey of Donzy, named Alice. By 1155, Stephen granted the Customs of Lorris to the merchants of the town and probably seven others. He was the de facto leader of a group of powerful baronial rebels against King Philip II between 1181 and 1185. In 1184, Stephen and a band of Brabançon mercenaries were defeated by the Philip and his Confrères de la Paix, an organisation of warriors formed in 1182 in Le Puy dedicated to curbing feudal warfare. Stephen abolished serfdom in his domains by 1190.

=== Crusade ===
Stephen and his brother, Theobald, joined the Third Crusade in 1190. He died on 21 October 1190 at the Siege of Acre, and Theobald died there a few months later in January 1191.

== Issue ==
Stephen and Alice had:

- William I, who succeeded him as Count of Sancerre.
- Jean
- Stephen, lord of Saint-Brisson

== Sources ==
- Baldwin, John W. (1991). The Government of Philip Augustus: Foundations of French Royal Power in the Middle Ages. University of California Press. ISBN 0520073916.
- Bennett, Stephen (2021). Elite Participation in the Third Crusade. The Boydell Press.
- Cline, Ruth Harwood (2007). "Abbot Hugh: An Overlooked Brother of Henry I, Count of Champagne". The Catholic Historical Review. 93 (3 (July)). Catholic University of America Press: 501–516. doi:10.1353/cat.2007.0240. S2CID 159951701.
- Devailly, Guy (1973). Le Berry, du X siecle au milieu du XIII. Mouton & Co.
- Edbury, Peter W.; Rowe, John Gordon (1988). William of Tyre: Historian of the Latin East. Cambridge University Press.
- Evergates, Theodore (2016). Henry the Liberal: Count of Champagne, 1127-1181. University of Pennsylvania Press.
- Hamilton, Bernard (2000). The Leper King and his Heirs: Baldwin IV and the Crusader Kingdom of Jerusalem. Cambridge University Press.
- Kedar, Benjamin Z. (1974). "The General Tax of 1183 in the Crusading Kingdom of Jerusalem: Innovation or Adaptation?". The English Historical Review. 89 (351). Oxford University Press: 339–345. doi:10.1093/ehr/LXXXIX.CCCLI.339.
- Richard, Jean (1992). Lloyd, Simon (ed.). Saint Louis, Crusader King of France. Translated by Birrell, Jean. Cambridge University Press.
