= Lagny Abbey =

Abbey in Seine-et-Marne, France

Coordinates: 48.8776°N 2.7058°E

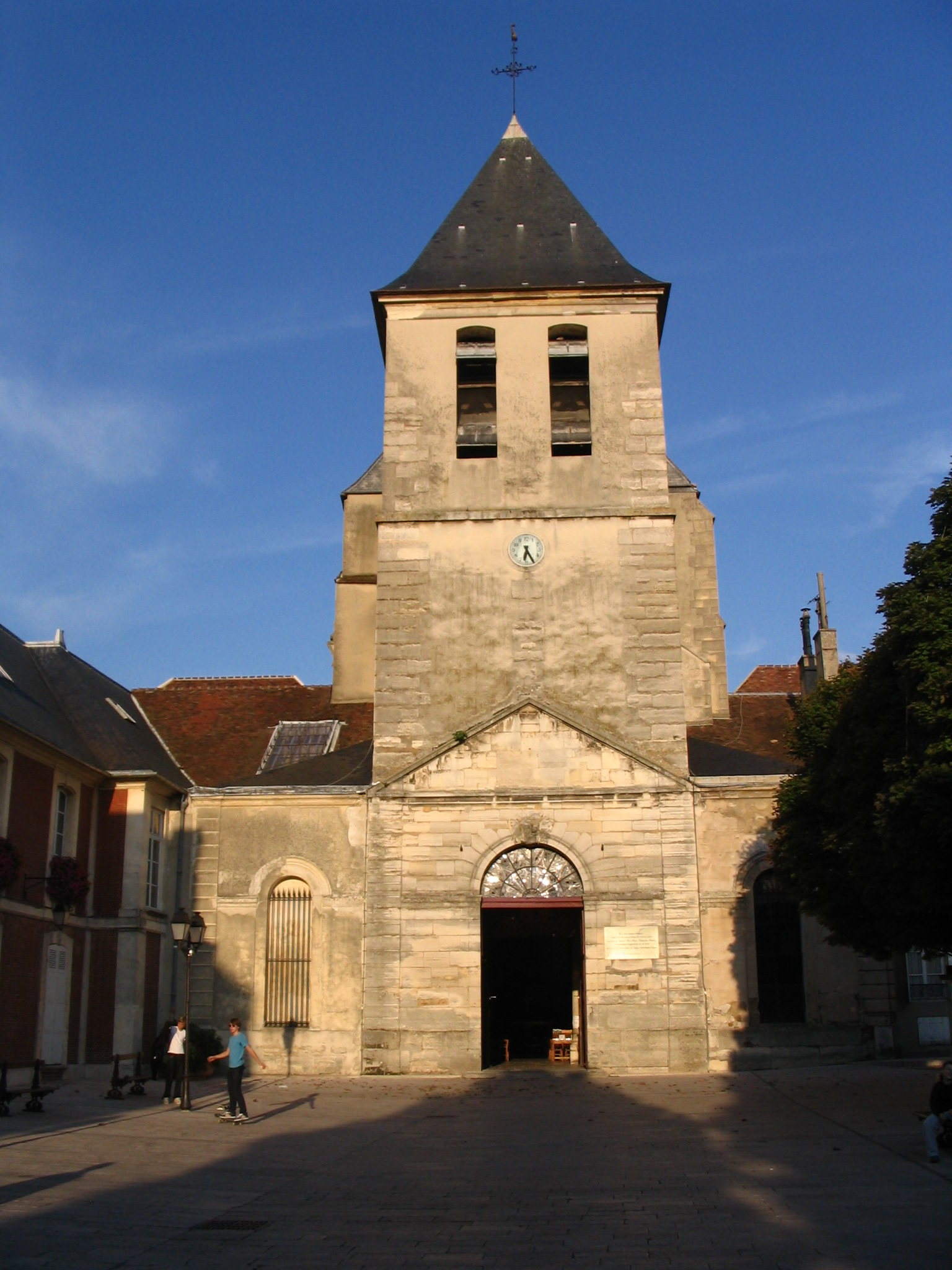
- Former abbey church
- Interactive map of Lagny Abbey

Monastery information
- Full name: St Peter’s Abbey, Lagny
- Other name: Abbaye Saint-Pierre de Lagny
- Order: Benedictine
- Established: 644
- Dedication: St Peter

People
- Founder: Saint Fursey

Site
- Location: Lagny-sur-Marne, Seine-et-Marne, France
- Visible remains: most of the main buildings
- Public access: yes

Lagny Abbey (St Peter’s Abbey, Lagny) was a monastery in the present-day commune of Lagny-sur-Marne in the department of Seine-et-Marne in France, in the eastern suburbs of Paris. It was founded in 644, refounded in about 990 and after well over a millennium of existence (almost 1,150 years) was seized by the state during the French Revolution.

== History ==
The original foundation was made about 644 by Saint Fursey, at the request of Erchinoald, then mayor of the palace of Burgundy, who also provided land for it. The new house quickly attracted gifts from Clovis II, king of Neustria and his wife, the Anglo-Saxon Queen Bathild (later canonised), and this ensured it a certain prestige.

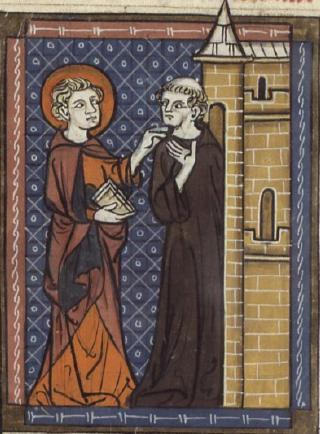
Saint Fursey (14th-cent. manuscript)

The earlier monastery was reduced to ruins by the Normans in the 9th century. Herbert II and Stephen I, Counts of Meaux, had the abbey rebuilt between 990 and 1018. In 1019 the newly rebuilt church was consecrated by Leotheric, Archbishop of Sens, and dedicated to Saint Peter, Saint Paul and the Holy Innocents. On that occasion, King Robert II of France made two gifts to the house from the treasure collected by the Emperor Charlemagne at Aix-la-Chapelle. One was considered to be a thorn from the Crown of Thorns of Jesus and the other a Holy Nail from his Crucifixion. Both were lost in 1567 when the Abbey was pillaged by Calvinists during the French Wars of Religion.

The Abbey of Saint-Père-en-Vallée just outside the medieval walls of Chartres had been founded by Queen Balthild in the 7th century. When in 1002 Abbot Magenard was imposed on the monks without an election by Count Theobald II of Blois, the monks fled to Lagny Abbey, returning only after two or three years following a reconciliation.

- In 1107 Pope Paschal II visited the abbey, and in 1131 Pope Innocent II.
- Prior to his election as Abbot of Gembloux (1115), Anselm of Gembloux had been scholaster or headmaster of the ecclesiastical school at Lagny Abbey.
- In 1163/1164 Pope Alexander III wrote to the abbot of Lagny requesting an annual payment of one ounce of gold, which was owed according to "a certain work among the books of the apostolic see", evidently the Liber Censuum, a large-scale record of revenues of the papacy covering the years 492-1192.

== Abbots ==
The early abbots seem to have been Irish missionaries and it is a difficult specialist task to piece together reliable details about their names, origins, and activity. It is also difficult to disentangle men with similar or identical names. An early figure who features in some accounts is Saint Eloquius (died 666), an Irish monk who may have been the successor of the founder, Saint Fursey, as Abbot.

It is said that in the 10th century Saint Forannan, an Irish Bishop-Abbot who had been originally Bishop of Donoughmore, had St Eloquius’ relics taken to Waulsort Abbey in modern Belgium where he had become abbot.

Another early abbot, though apparently only for a time, was Saint Mombulus, also an Irishman, who left the abbey to evangelize in Picardy around Chauny before dying and being buried at Condren.

In the period after the Normans had launched their conquest of England, we know of two abbots of Lagny intimately linked with the Counts of Champagne and their kin.

One was Arnold of Champagne, Abbot of Lagny from 1066 to 1106. He was the brother of Saint Theobald of Provins and a relative of the Counts of Champagne Odo II, Theobald III et Theobald IV, their common ancestor being Saint Theobald of Vienne (927-1001).

In 1075 Abbot Arnold brought to the abbey on horseback from Italy important relics of his younger brother Theobald, who had been canonized by Pope Alexander II not long before (1073). It is from this relic that the neighbouring locality of Saint-Thibault-des-Vignes took its name in 1081, and that there developed and spread in France the cult of the Saint, who been a hermit and a pilgrim and on his deathbed had taken the vows of a Camaldolese monk.

Another member of the same family was Hugh, abbot of Lagny from 1163 to 1171, the illegitimate son of Theobald II, Count of Champagne (1090-1152), mentioned above, who was Count of Blois and of Chartres as Theobald IV from 1102; and Count of Champagne and of Brie as Theobald II from 1125. Hugh, having been first a knight and then a monk at Tiron Abbey, was appointed through the influence of his uncles Stephen, King of England and Henry of Blois, Bishop of Winchester successively abbot of two English monasteries, St Benet's Abbey, Holme, in Norfolk and Chertsey Abbey in Surrey. Having returned briefly as a simple monk to Tiron, he was made Abbot of Lagny (1163-1171), which housed the tomb of his father (see below) and probably of other family members.

When the trial against the Templars began in England on 20 October 1309, among the judges were two papal inquisitors, one of whom was Sicard de Vaur, a canon of Narbonne and judge at Avignon, but the other inquisitor was Deodatus (Dieudonné), Abbot of Lagny.

== A Miracle by Joan of Arc ==
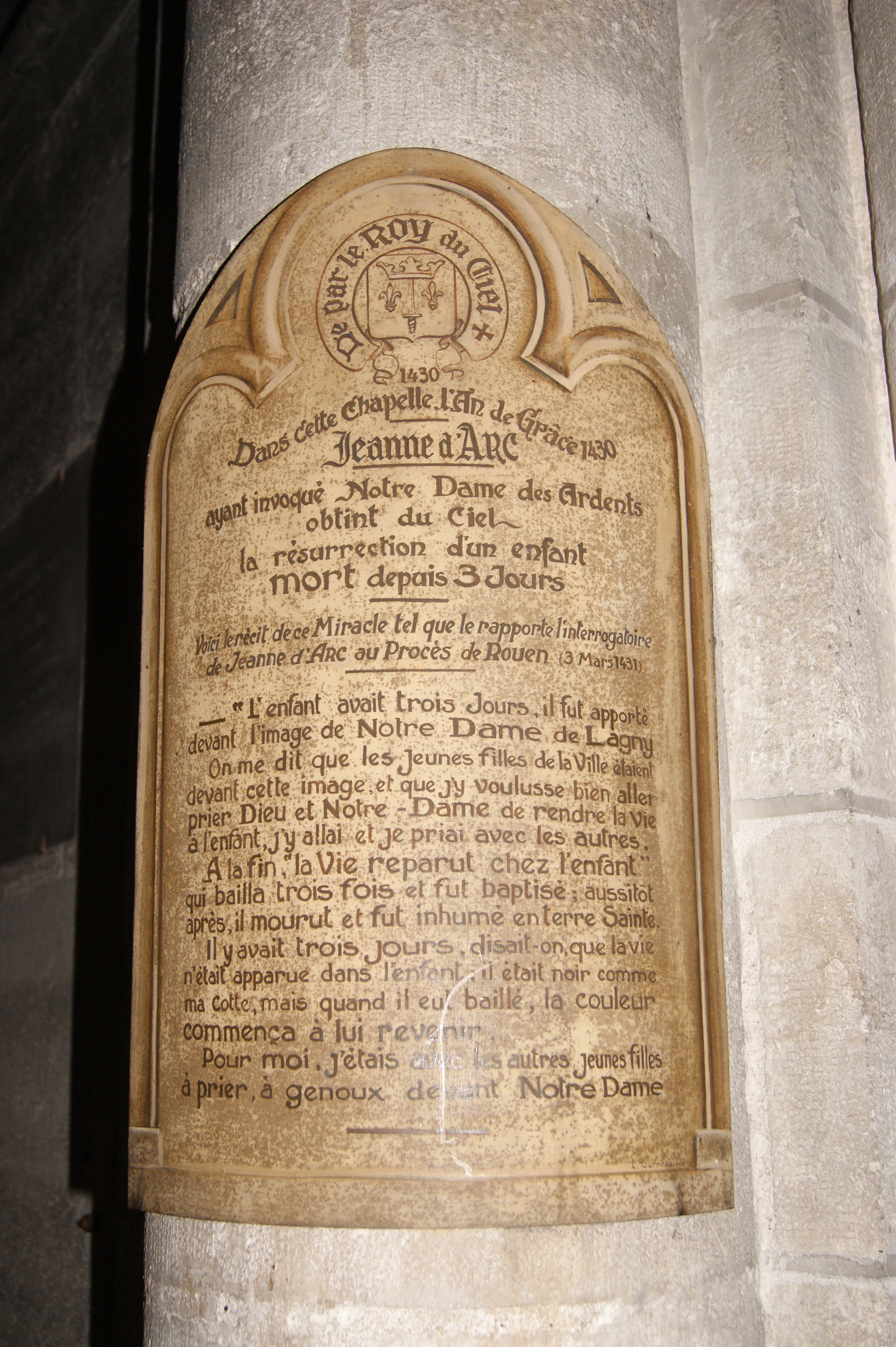
Plaque with extracts from records of the Rouen trial that recount the miracle.

Joan of Arc visited the village twice. The second time, in 1430, she is said to have raised from the dead a child who had died three days before. This episode was taken into account in the cause for her canonization. Joan herself had recounted the event in the course of the trial she underwent at Rouen on 3 March 1431:

"The child was three days old. He was carried before the statue of Our Lady of Lagny. They told me the girls of the village were in front of the statue and that I should be so good as to go and pray God and Our Lady to give life back to the child, and I went there and prayed with the others. At the end, life reappeared in the child, who yawned three times and was baptized. Immediately afterwards he died and was buried in consecrated ground. They said there had been no sign of life in the child for three days. He was as black as my chain mail but after he had yawned his colour started to return. As for me, I was with the other young girls, kneeling, praying in front of Our Lady."

When she was about to set off from Lagny for Senlis on 5 May 1430, it is said that Joan entrusted the abbey with six swords, of which one had been used by Charles Martel at the Battle of Poitiers in 732, but these later disappeared.

== Burials ==
- Herbert II of Troyes, born c. 950, died 995.
- Theobald II, Count of Champagne, born 1090/1095, died 10 January 1152. The tomb, in porphyry, was at least two-tiered, some 7–8 feet long and 4 feet wide.

== Abbey Church ==
In 1033 and especially in 1127 there was a severe outbreak among the population of Lagny of ergotism or "Saint Anthony's Fire", caused by a fungal infection of cereals. The people prayed to the Blessed Virgin Mary for help, and from that time one of the names of the abbey church has been Notre-Dame des Ardents, "Our Lady of the Ardents", the latter being those afflicted by this condition.

The abbey church was damaged by fires in 1134, 1157, 1176, 1184 and 1205. After the last named the abbot of the time, Jean Britel, decided a reconstruction was necessary and extensive works were undertaken. Radical works were undertaken in 1686, shortening the church and erecting a new but flimsy facade, after which the church was reconsecrated. The unsafe condition of the building in 1750 forced further works which demolished the 12th century nave and bell tower, a new bell tower being erected. The revolutionary regime passed a law that each commune was to have only one church. Lagny then had four for its 1,723 inhabitants. Its choice fell upon adopting the abbey church as the new parish church and on 12 August 1792 the other churches were closed. At this period the abbey church was briefly named after Saint Fursey (the dedication of one of the former churches) but when the regime disavowed Christianity, the church as elsewhere became for a time a Temple of Reason.

Further restoration and refurbishment took place in 1860. The Franco-Prussian war brought serious damage when the church was occupied by German troops and French prisoners of war and all the wood in the church was stripped for firewood. At that period the King of Prussia, William I, happened to pass through the village and seeing the condition of the church, left a donation of 400 francs for repairs. The money was used to pay for a new organ, installed in 1874. German shellfire damaged the church again in 1944. In 1950 the church assumed the present name Notre Dame des Ardents-et-Saint Pierre to commemorate Lagny's deliverance from "Saint Anthony's Fire".

== Fate of the Abbey Property ==
The Abbey's buildings were seized as state property during the French Revolution and in 1796 sold off. Some of the monastery buildings were used as a military hospital and, from 1842, served as the Hôtel de Ville.

The church, known now in French as the "Abbatiale Notre-Dame-des-Ardents et Saint-Pierre", has been classed as a national monument since 1886 and the rest of the monastery buildings since 1969.

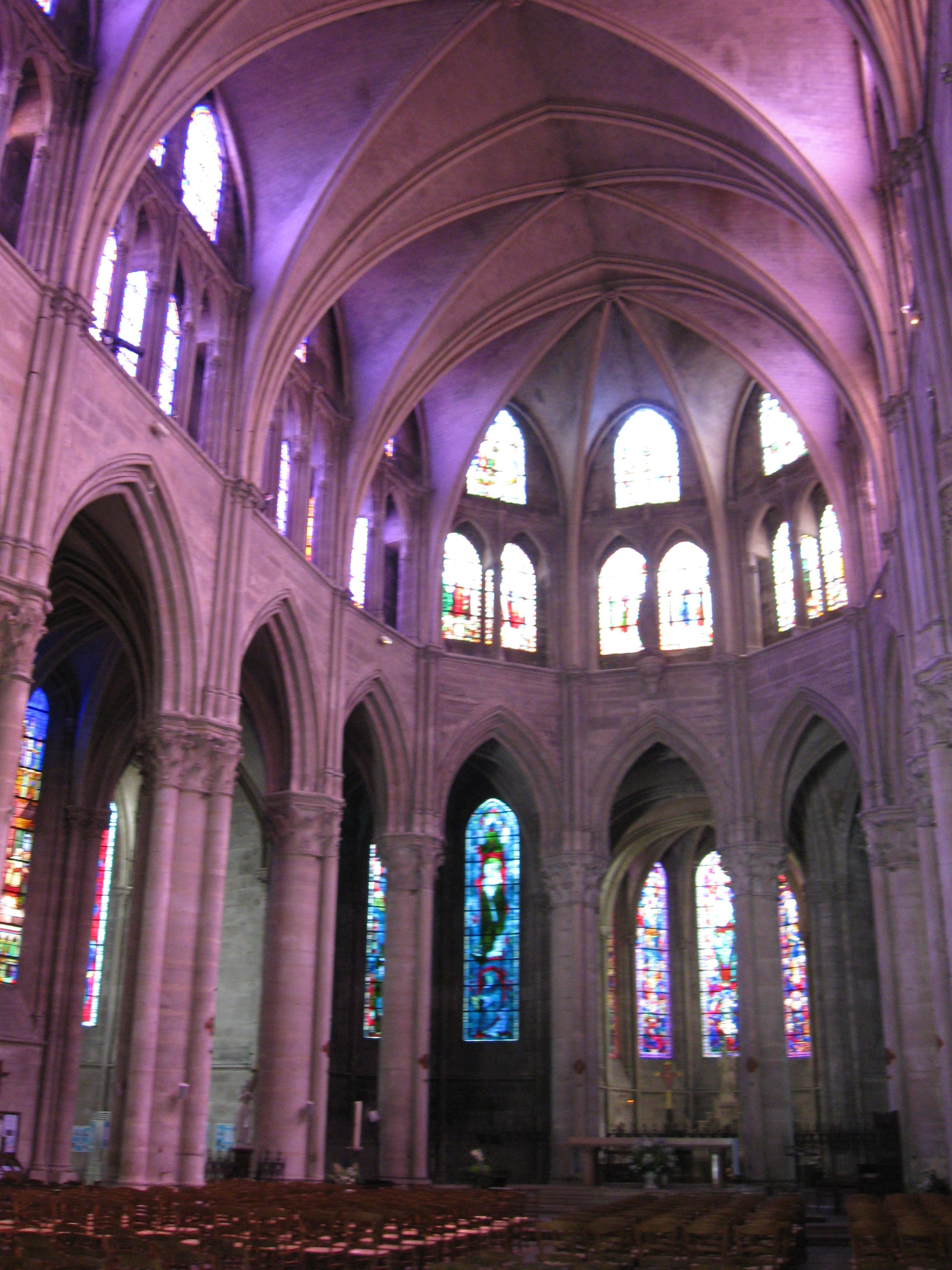
Choir of former abbey church

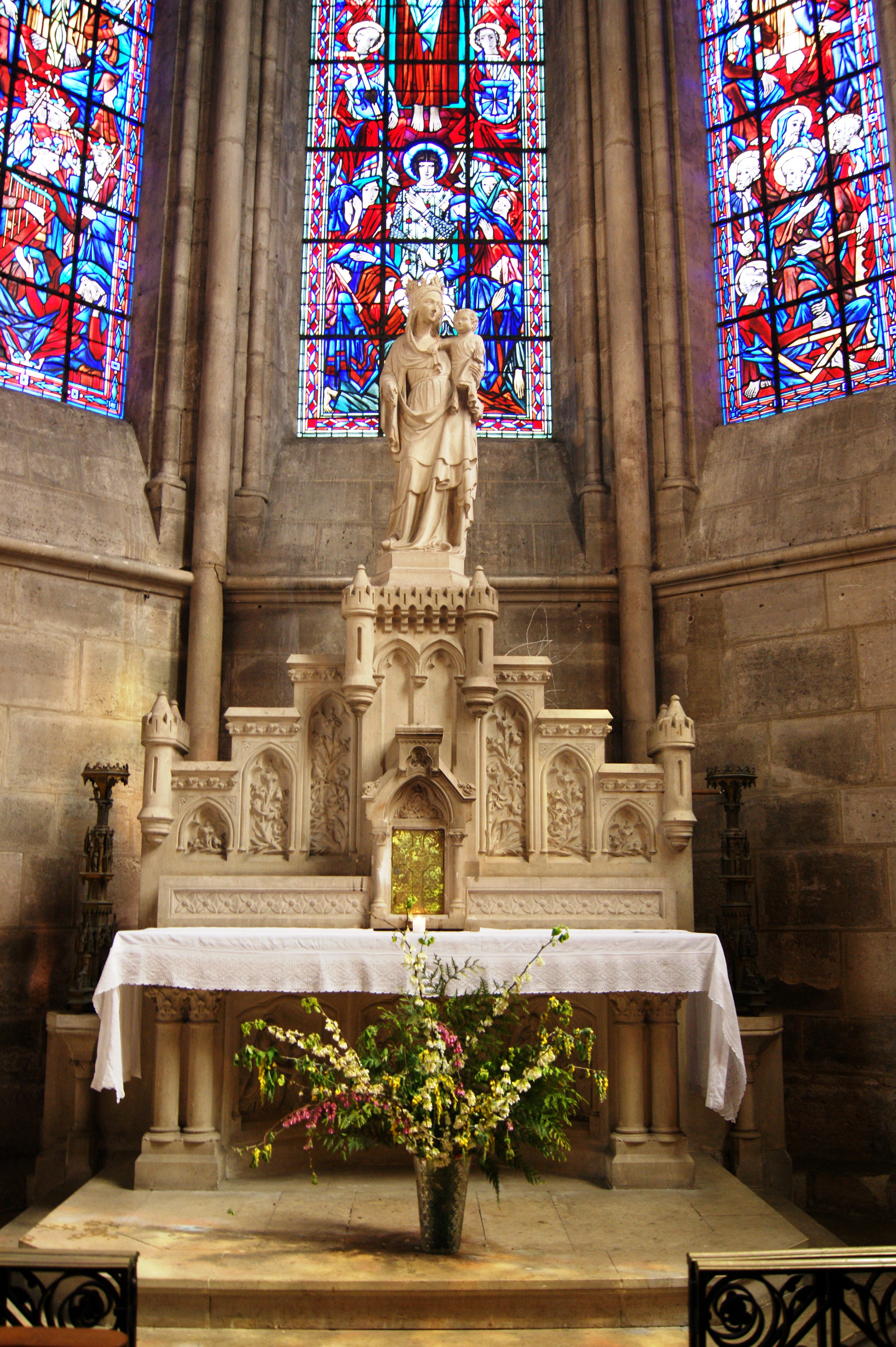
Lady Chapel

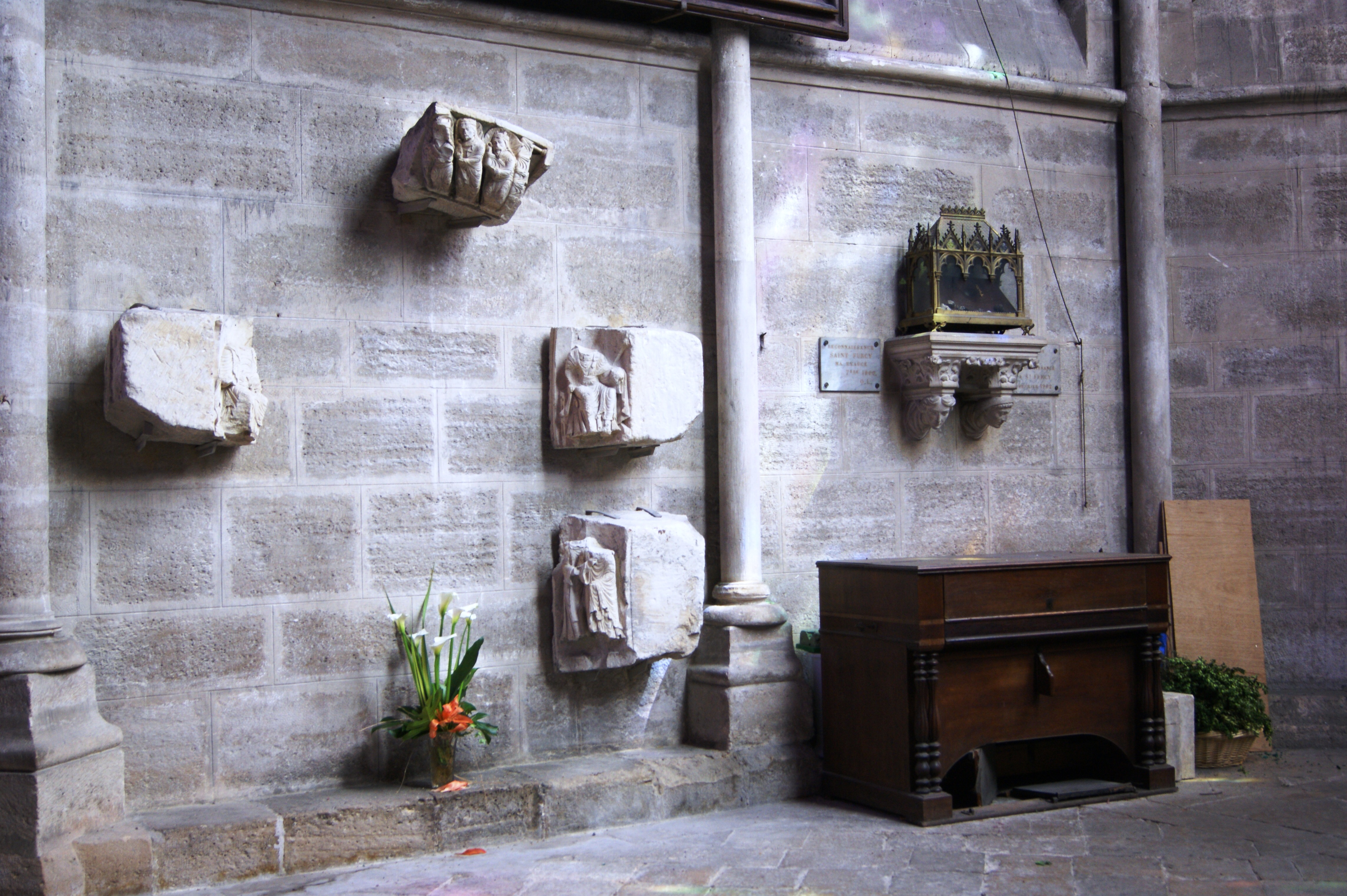
Chapel of Saint Fursey

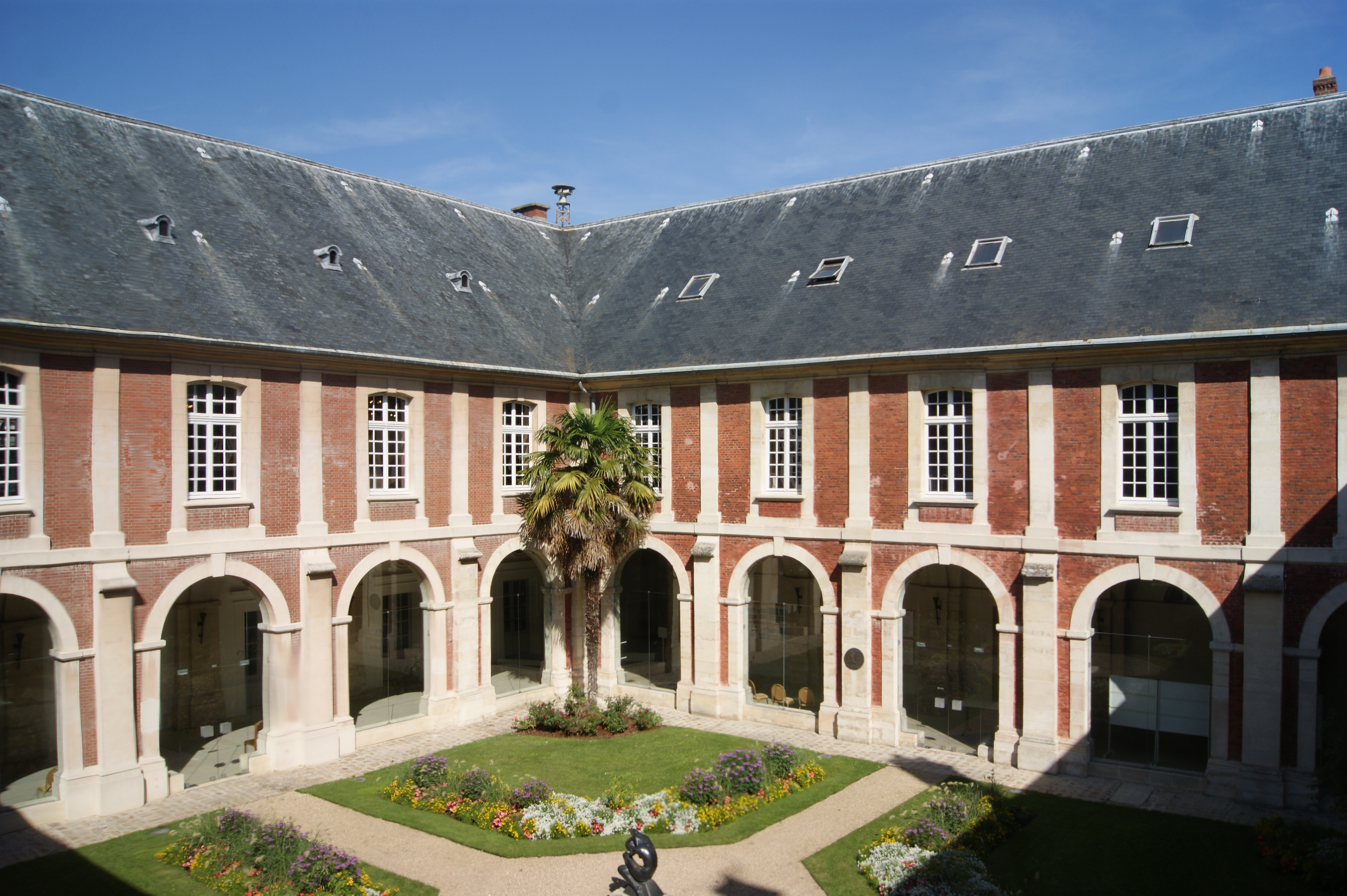
Former abbey cloister, now municipal offices

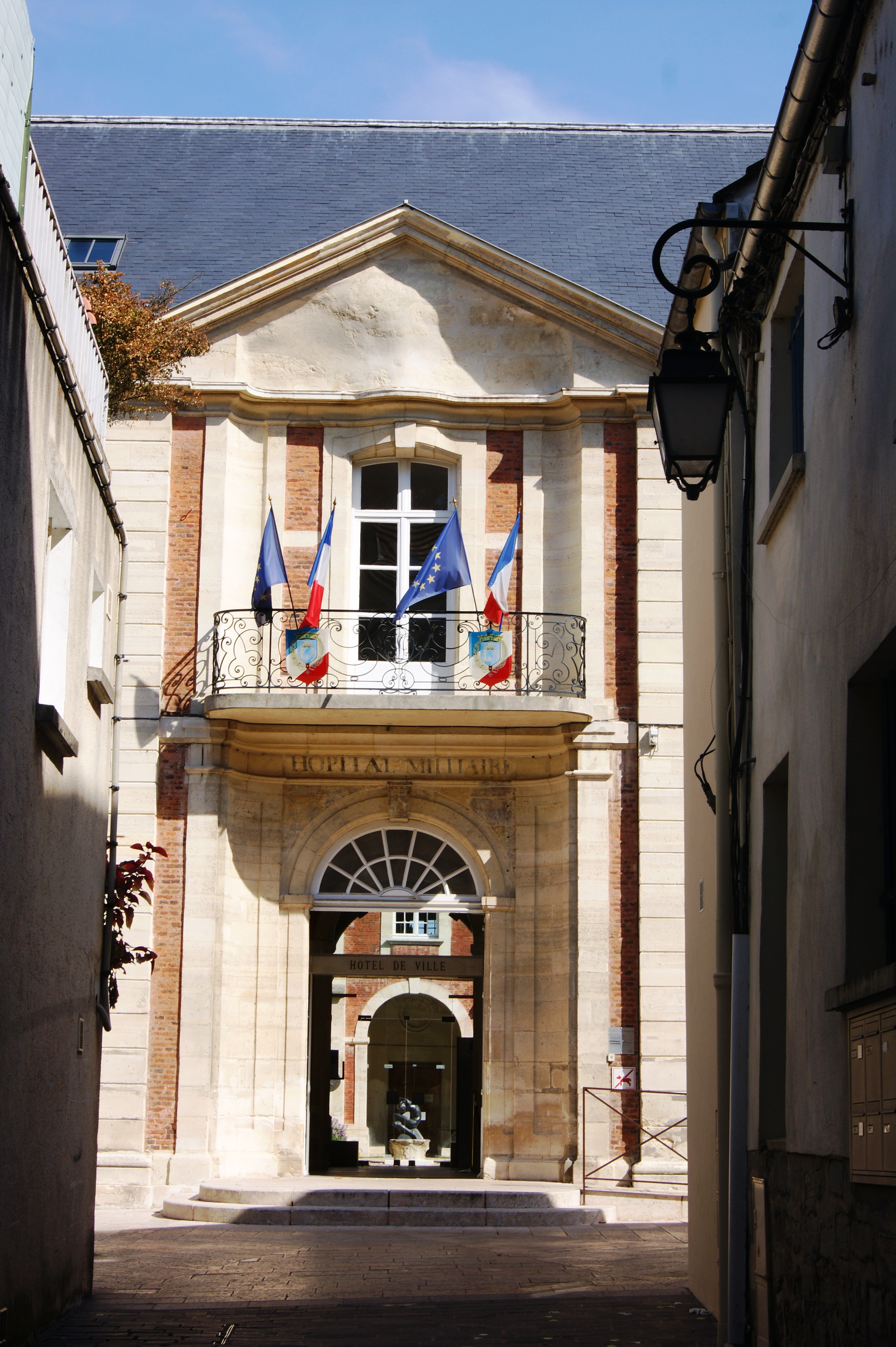
Entrance to the municipal offices

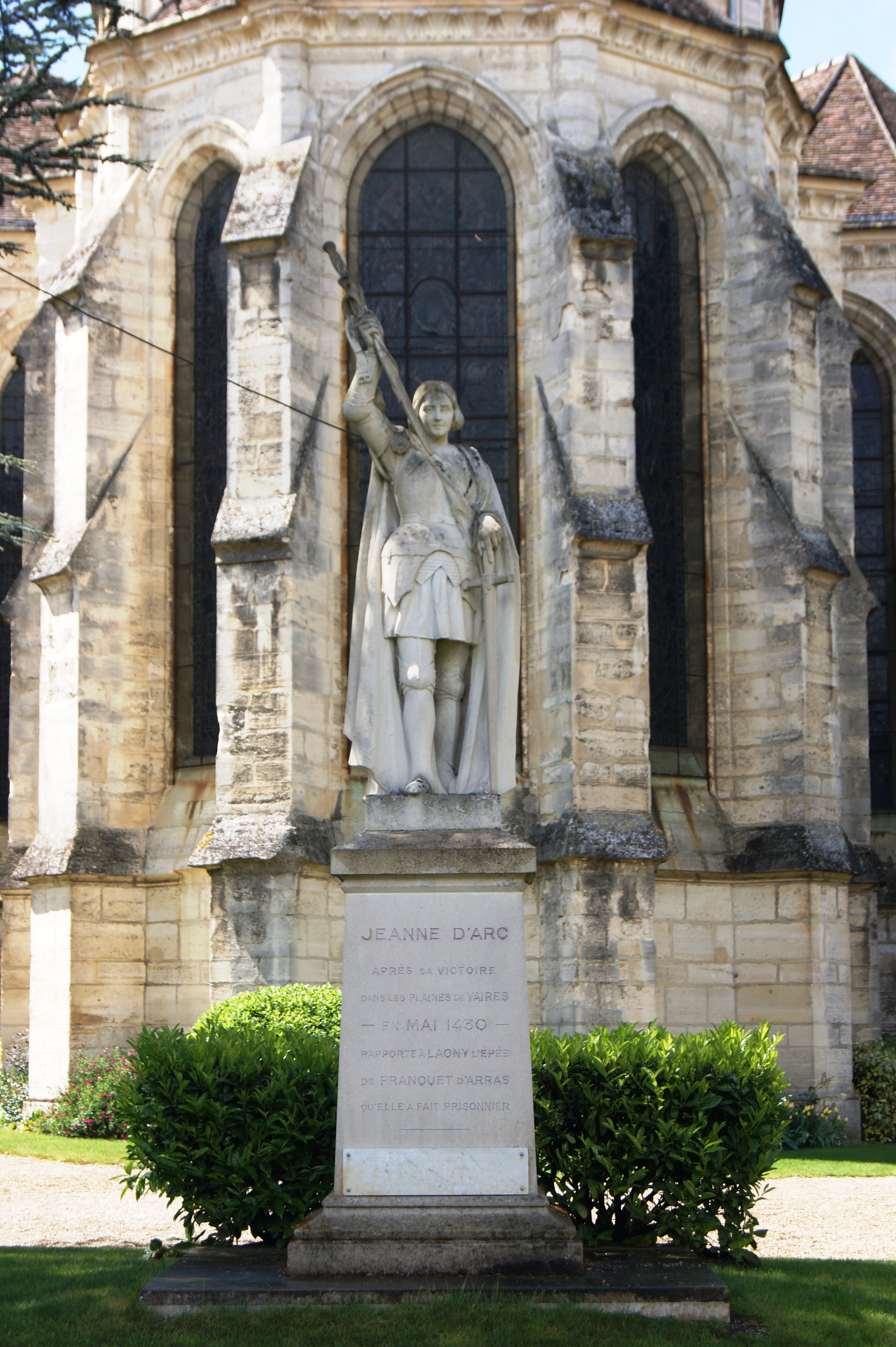
Joan of Arc, statue outside apse

== See also ==
- Communes of the Seine-et-Marne department
- List of Benedictine monasteries in France
