= Odo II of Burgundy =

Duke of Burgundy from 1143 to 1162

Odo II
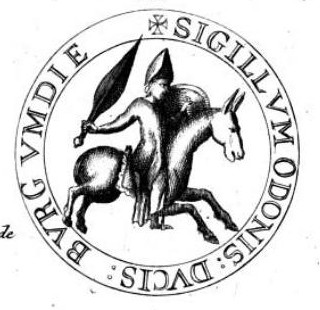
- Seal of Duke Odo

Duke of Burgundy
- Reign: 1143 – 1162
- Predecessor: Hugh II
- Successor: Hugh III
- Born: 1118
- Died: 27 June (or 27 September) 1162
- Spouse: Marie of Blois-Champagne
- Issue detail: Hugh III, Duke of Burgundy; Mahaut of Burgundy; Alix of Burgundy
- House: Burgundy
- Father: Hugh II, Duke of Burgundy
- Mother: Matilda of Turenne

Odo II (1118 – 27 June (or 27 September) 1162) was Duke of Burgundy between 1143 and 1162.

== Family ==
Odo was the eldest son of Hugh II, Duke of Burgundy and Matilda of Mayenne, daughter of Gauthier, Count of Mayenne and Adelina de Presles. Odo married Marie, daughter of Theobald II, Count of Champagne and Matilda of Carinthia.

Odo and Marie had:

- Alix (1146–1192), married in 1164 to Archambaud (died 1169), son of Archambaud VII (died 1171), Lord of Bourbon
- Hugh III, Duke of Burgundy, his successor in the duchy
- Mahaut (died 1202), married Robert IV, Count of Auvergne

== Sources ==
- Bouchard, Constance Brittain (1987). Sword, Miter, and Cloister: Nobility and the Church of Burgundy, 980-1198. Cornell University Press.
- Fassler, Margot Elsbeth (2010). The Virgin of Chartres: Making History Through Liturgy and the Arts. Yale University Press.
- Thompson, Kathleen (2002). Power and Border Lordship in Medieval France: The County of the Perche, 1000-1226. The Boydell Press.95

Odo II of Burgundy House of Burgundy Cadet branch of the Capetian dynasty Born: 1120-26 Died: 27 June or 27 September 1162
Regnal titles
| Preceded by Hugh II | Duke of Burgundy; 1143–1162 | Succeeded by Hugh III |
