= Capuciati =

Catholic confraternity

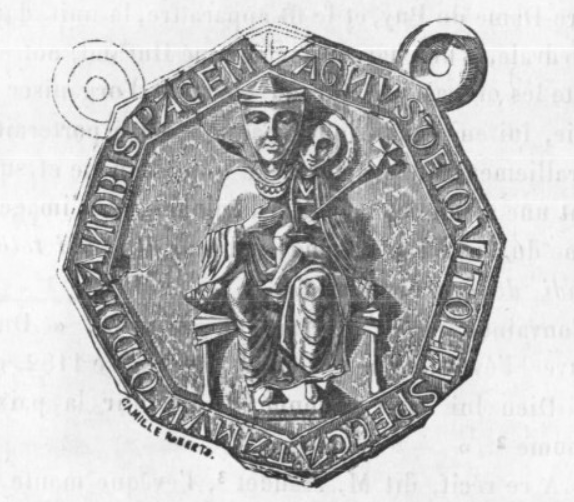
Capuciati Medal

Capuciati is the name (from caputium, hood, the headgear which was one of their distinctive marks) of a short-lived Catholic confraternity also named Confrères de la Paix ("Confraternity of Peace"). They formed an organisation of warriors dedicated to maintaining peace and order in France in the late twelfth century. They were first organised at Le Puy in 1182 and participated conspicuously in support of Philip Augustus against Stephen I of Sancerre and his Brabançon mercenaries then ravaging the Orléanais in 1184.

== History ==
The Capuciati were founded in 1182 or 1183 in France for the restoration and maintenance of peace. It was one of the various attempts to put an end to the incessant wars and feuds which were spreading ruin and desolation throughout that country during the twelfth century. The origin of the Capuciati is traced to a poor carpenter of Le Puy, named Durand, who claimed to have had an apparition of the Blessed Virgin Mary in 1182. In this vision he received a paper on which there was a representation of the Blessed Virgin seated on a throne with a figure of the child Jesus in her hands, and bearing the inscription, "Lamb of God who takest away the sins of the world give us peace". An association was to be formed whose members should bind themselves to keep and procure peace and, as distinctive signs, wear a white hood and a medal bearing a reproduction of the picture and inscription. Durand met with astounding success in the execution of these instructions. A confraternity was organized under the direction of the clergy exactly on the lines of Catholic confraternities of the present day. The Church of Our Lady of Le Puy became the centre of the movement, which spread with extraordinary rapidity over the province of France, south of the Loire.

The Capuciati, in addition to pledging themselves not to swear falsely, not to blaspheme, not to play dice, enter taverns, or wear costly garments, also promised to do all in their power to restore and maintain peace. Their endeavours in this line were not ineffectual, an overwhelming defeat which the "Routiers", or undisciplined bands of soldiery of the period, sustained in 1183 must be largely ascribed to the co-operation of the Capuciati with the French royal army.

The existence of the confraternity was of short duration. Its disappearance is involved in obscurity; but it seems to have directed its efforts against the members of the nobility, and to have been wiped out of existence by them, aided by the "Routiers". Its advocacy of heretical principles is not clearly and trustworthily indicated in historical records. The accusation that it respected neither ecclesiastical nor civil authority may perhaps be explained by its resistance to real or imagined abuses of power.

Medievalist Richard Landes notes that a later and hostile ecclesiastical chronicler expressed a harsh "augustinian" attitude towards the behavior of the peasants because they challenged seigneurial dominance in their short lived attempt at reform.

The league of the sworn of Le Puy was only a diabolic and pernicious invention. There was no longer fear or respect for superiors. All strove to acquire liberty, saying that it belonged to them from the time of Adam and Eve, from the very day of creation. They did not understand that serfdom is the punishment of sin! The result was that there was no longer any distinction between the great and the small, but a fatal confusion tending to ruin the institutions which rule us all, through the will of God and the agency of the powerful of this earth.

== Other use ==
Capcuceati was also a designation applied to that special class of English Lollards who profited by the preaching and denunciations of the former Augustinian friar Peter Pateshull (c. 1387) to indulge in deeds of iconoclasm. They owed their name to their practice of keeping the hoods on their heads in presence of the Blessed Sacrament.
