= Hugh III of Burgundy =

Duke of Burgundy from 1162 to 1192

Hugh III
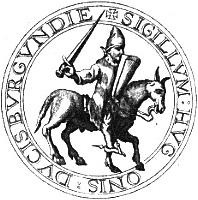
- Seal of Hugh III of Burgundy

Duke of Burgundy
- Reign: 1162–1192
- Predecessor: Odo II
- Successor: Odo III
- Born: 1142
- Died: 25 August 1192 (aged 49–50); Acre
- Spouse: Alice of Lorraine (m. 1165; div. 1183) Beatrice of Albon (m. 1183)
- Issue Detail: Odo III, Duke of Burgundy; Guy VI of Viennois; Margaret of Burgundy
- House: Burgundy
- Father: Odo II, Duke of Burgundy
- Mother: Marie of Blois-Champagne

Hugh III (1142 – 25 August 1192) was Duke of Burgundy between 1162 and 1192. As duke, Burgundy was invaded by King Philip II and Hugh was forced to sue for peace. Hugh then joined the Third Crusade, distinguishing himself at Arsuf and Acre, where he died in 1192.

== Life ==
Hugh was the eldest son of Duke Odo II and Marie of Blois-Champagne, daughter of Theobald II, Count of Champagne. Hugh was fourteen when he became duke, and was under the guardianship and regency of his mother for three years.

The rule of Hugh III marked the ending of a period of relative peace in the duchy of Burgundy. Hugh was a belligerent man and soon was involved in conflicts against King Louis VII of France over their borders. When Philip Augustus succeeded Louis in 1180, Hugh seized the opportunity and forced several men to change their allegiance to Burgundy. Philip II was not happy with the loss of his vassals and invaded the duchy, besieging Châtillon in 1186. The town fell and with it, its garrison, commanded by Odo, Hugh's heir. A peace was negotiated and Hugh had to pay a high ransom for his son and give up ambitions over French territory.

In 1187, Hugh transferred the capital of Burgundy to Dijon, and endeavoured to turn the city into a major commercial centre.

== Joins crusade ==
Hugh then turned his energies to the Holy Land, embarking in the Third Crusade in the retinue of Philip II. Hugh played a major role in the victory of the Battle of Arsuf (7 September 1191) and at the Siege of Acre. When Philip returned to France in July 1191, he left Hugh in charge of the French troops. In January 1192, Hugh traveled to Ascalon and argued with Richard I of England over pay for his troops. He died 25 August 1192 at Acre.

== Marriage and issue ==
He was married twice:

Firstly, in 1165, to Alice (1145–1200), daughter of Matthias I, Duke of Lorraine; he repudiated her in 1183. With his first wife he had:

- Odo III (1166–1218), his successor in the Duchy
- Alexander (1170–1206), Lord of Montaigu, married Beatrix of Montaigu
- Douce (1175 – c. 1219), married in 1196 Simon of Semur (d. 1219), Lord of Luzy
- Alice (1177–1266), married Béraud VII, Lord of Mercœur and Robert VI, Dauphin d'Auvergne (d. 1252)

Secondly, in 1183, to Beatrice (1161–1228), Countess of Albon and Dauphine of Viennois. With his second wife, he had:

- Guigues VI (1184–1237), Dauphin of Viennois
- Mahaut (1190–1242), married in 1214 John I, Count of Châlon and Auxonne (1190–1267)
- Margaret (1192–1243), married in 1222 Amadeus IV (1197–1253), Count of Savoy

== Sources ==
- Bouchard, Constance Brittain (1987). Sword, Miter, and Cloister: Nobility and the Church in Burgundy, 980–1198. Cornell University Press.
- Cox, Eugene L (1974). The Eagles of Savoy. Princeton University Press. ISBN 0691052166.
- Fawtier, Robert (1960). Capetian Kings of France: Monarchy and Nation, 987-1328. Translated by Butler, Lionel; Adam, R.J. Macmillan.
- Gillingham, John (1999). Richard I. Yale University Press.
- Lock, Peter (2006). The Routledge Companion to the Crusades. Routledge.
- Painter, Sidney (1969). "The Third Crusade: Richard the Lionhearted and Philip Augustus". In Setton, Kenneth M.; Wolff, Robert Lee; Hazard, Harry W. (eds.). The Later Crusades, 1189-1311. University of Wisconsin Press.
- Rigord (2022). Gaposchkin, M. Cecilia; Field, Sean L. (eds.). The Deeds of Philip Augustus: An English Translation of Rigord's "Gesta Philippi Augusti". Translated by Field, Larry F. Cornell University Press.
- Suger (2018). Selected Works of Abbot Suger of Saint Denis. Translated by Cusamano, Richard; Whitmore, Eric. Catholic University of America Press.

Hugh III of Burgundy House of Burgundy Cadet branch of the Capetian dynasty Born: 1142 Died: 25 August 1192
Preceded by Odo II	Duke of Burgundy; 1162–1192	Succeeded by Odo III
