= Rumburgh Priory =

Benedictine priory in Suffolk, England

Coordinates: 52.3846°N 1.4466°E

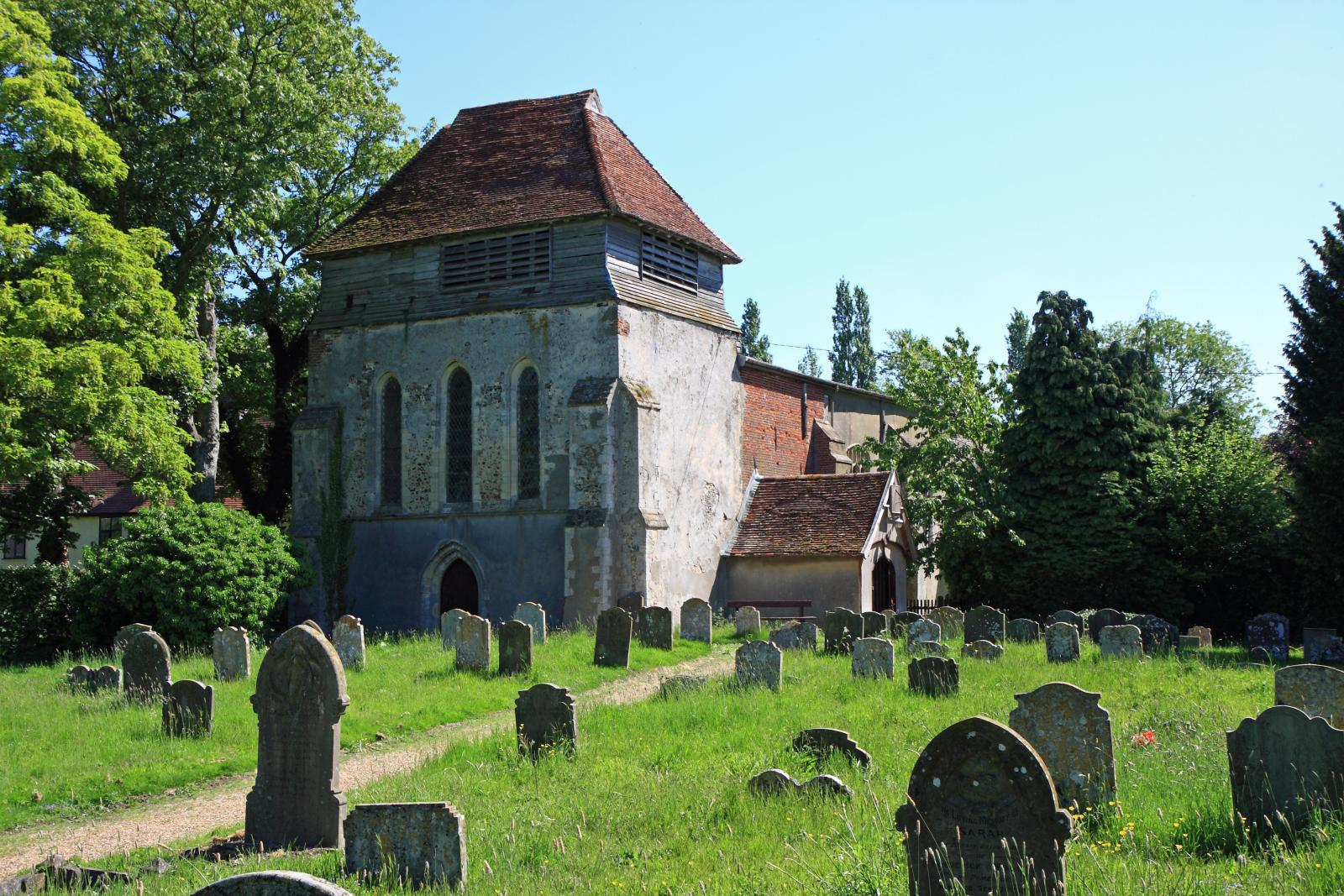
St Michael's Church in Rumburgh, Suffolk

Rumburgh Priory was a Benedictine priory located in the village of Rumburgh in the English county of Suffolk. The priory was founded in about 1065 as a cell of St Benet's Abbey at Hulme in Norfolk. At the time of the Domesday Book in 1086 it had 12 monks. The ownership of the priory was transferred to St Mary's Abbey in York towards the end of the 12th century. The monks of Rumburgh were particularly devoted to St. Bee, whom they commemorated at Michaelmas.

The priory had chapels at Wissett and Spexhall in Suffolk, but was "suppressed" in 1528 by Cardinal Wolsey and used to provide funds for the building of his Cardinal College in Ipswich. The monks were directed to join other monasteries of the same order.

The priory church survives as the parish church of Rumburgh, dedicated to St Michael and St Felix, and is a Grade I listed building. It has a number of features dating to the 13th and 15th centuries, including an unusual 13th-century tower.
