= Marie of Blois, Duchess of Burgundy =

French noblewoman and abbess (1128–1190)

Marie
- Duchess of Burgundy; Abbess of Fontevraud
- Born: 1128
- Died: 1190 (aged 61–62)
- Noble family: House of Champagne
- Spouse: Odo II, Duke of Burgundy
- Issue Detail: Hugh III, Duke of Burgundy
- Father: Theobald II, Count of Champagne
- Mother: Matilda of Carinthia

Marie of Blois or Marie of Champagne (1128–1190) was duchess of Burgundy by marriage to Odo II, Duke of Burgundy, and then abbess of Fontevraud. She served as regent of the Duchy of Burgundy during the minority of her son Hugh III, Duke of Burgundy in 1162-1165.

She was the daughter of Theobald II, Count of Champagne and Matilda of Carinthia, who was the daughter of Engelbert, Duke of Carinthia.

== Biography ==
Marie of Blois was the daughter of Count Theobald of Champagne and Matilda of Carinthia. She became duchess of Burgundy by her marriage to Odo II of Burgundy in 1145.

After the death of her husband in 1162, she became the guardian and thus regent of her son, Hugh, who became the duke of Burgundy when he was fourteen years old. She tried to marry her son to Eleanor of Vermandois, the daughter of Ralph I of Vermandois and Petronilla of Aquitaine. The match fell through for unknown reasons even though Marie had the support of Louis VII of France.

As Hugh grew older and fell under the influence of the noblemen Odo I of Grancey and Guy of Vergy, his relationship with his mother deteriorated and he wanted to free himself from her guardianship. In April 1165, Marie was driven from the court and deprived of her dowry. She was thus forced to ask for help from Louis VII of France, who summoned both Marie and Hugh to court, but Hugh ignored his summons. After several warnings that remained unanswered, the king began to make preparations for war. Hugh made an alliance with the Holy Roman Emperor Frederick Barbarossa, who then sent Henry I of Champagne to serve as a mediator between the king and the duke. Henry seems to have succeeded in restoring peace between Marie and Hugh without the need of armed battle between the King of France and the Holy Roman Emperor.

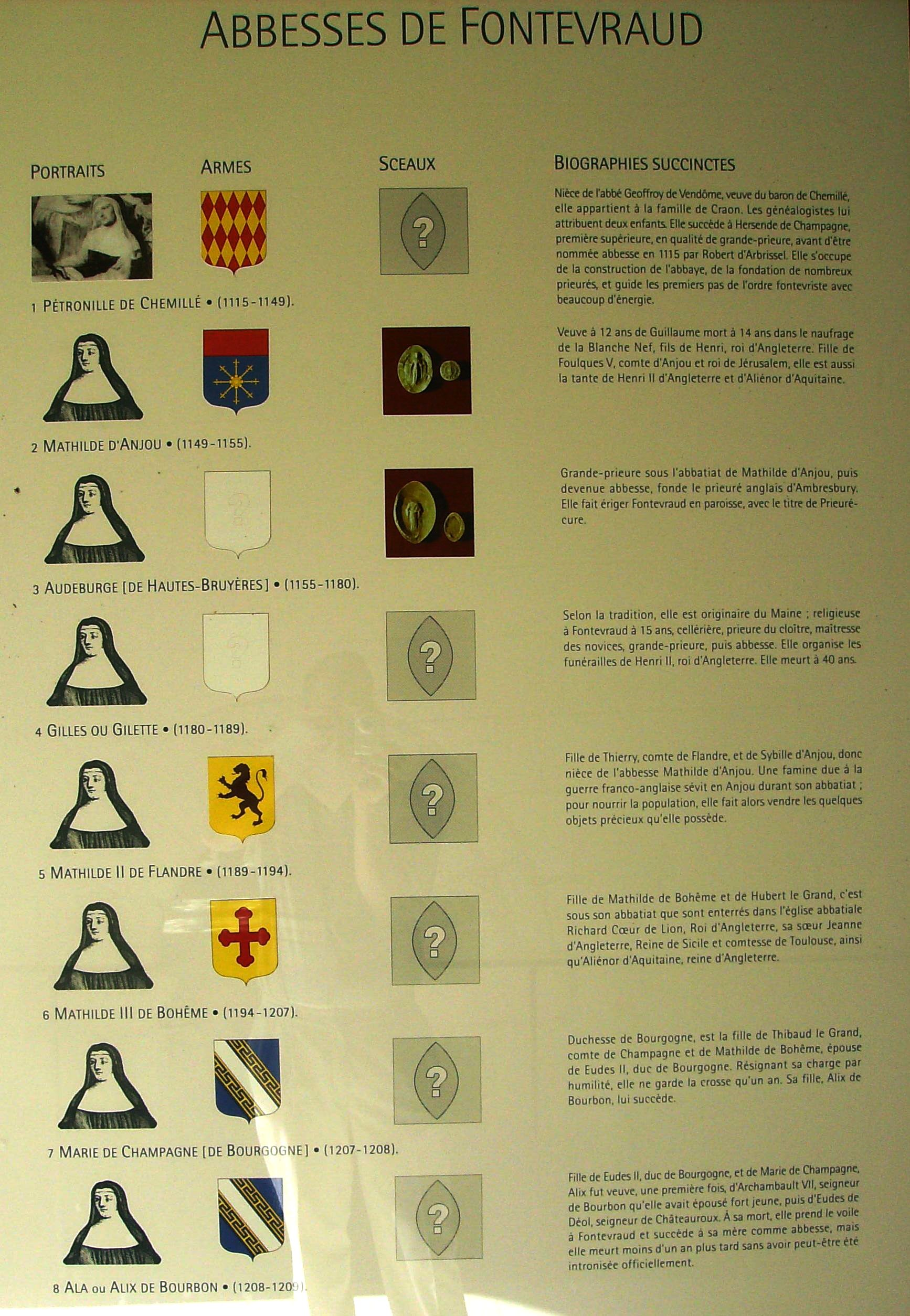
List of abbesses displayed in the abbey of Fontevraud.

Marie chose to retire to the abbey of Fontevraud, where she became abbess in 1174. Marie died in 1190; the list of abbesses inside of the abbey lists that she died in 1207 or 1208, but this is likely thanks to confusion with her sister Marguerite, who was also at the abbey.

== Marriage and issue ==
In 1145, Marie married Odo II, Duke of Burgundy, the son of Hugh II of Burgundy and Matilda of Turenne. They had four children:

- Alix (1146 - 1209), married in 1164 to Archambaud of Bourbon, son of Archambaud VII de Bourbon, then to Odo of Déols, Lord of Châteauroux. Once widowed, like her mother, she became abbess of Fontevraud.
- Hugh III, Duke of Burgundy (1148 - 1192), the successor to the duchy.
- Mahaut (died 1202), married Robert IV of Auvergne, the son of William VIII of Auvergne and Anne of Nevers.
- An unknown daughter, married to Robert, Lord de Boisleux.

== Sources ==
- Marie Henry d'Arbois de Jubainville, Histoire des Ducs et Comtes de Champagne, 1865.
- Ernest Petit, Histoire des ducs de Bourgogne de la race capétienne, 1888.
