= Matilda of Carinthia =

12th-century Countess of Champagne

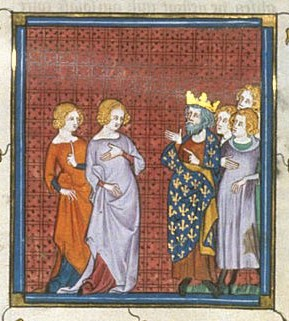
- Countess of Chartres appealing to Louis the Fat
- Died: 13 December 1160 or 1161
- Noble family: House of Sponheim
- Spouse: Theobald II, Count of Champagne
- Issue Detail: Henry I, Count of Champagne; Theobald V, Count of Blois; Adela, Queen of France; Stephen I of Sancerre; William White Hands
- Father: Engelbert, Duke of Carinthia
- Mother: Uta of Passau

Matilda of Carinthia (Mathilde of Sponheim; died 13 December 1160 or 1161) was the daughter of Engelbert, Duke of Carinthia and Uta of Passau. She married Theobald II, Count of Champagne in 1123.

== Issue ==
Her children with Theobald were:

- Henry I, Count of Champagne
- Theobald V, Count of Blois
- Adela of Champagne
- Elizabeth, wife of Roger III, Duke of Apulia and William Gouet IV
- Marie, wife of Odo II, Duke of Burgundy
- William White Hands
- Stephen I of Sancerre
- Agnes, wife of Reginald II, Count of Bar
- Margaret, nun at Fontevrault
- Matilda, wife of Rotrou IV, Count of Perche

== Sources ==
- Baldwin, John W. (2002). Aristocratic Life in Medieval France. Johns Hopkins University.
- Chibnall, Marjorie, ed. (2002). The Ecclesiastical History of Orderic Vitalis. Vol. VI Book XI. Clarendon Press Texts.
- Cline, Ruth Harwood (2007). "Abbot Hugh: An Overlooked Brother of Henry I, Count of Champagne". The Catholic Historical Review. 93, No. 3 July. Catholic University of America Press.
- Evergates, Theodore (2016). Henry the Liberal: Count of Champagne, 1127-1181. University of Pennsylvania Press.
- Fassler, Margot Elsbeth (2010). The Virgin of Chartres: Making History Through Liturgy and the Arts. Yale University Press.
