= Theobald II of Champagne =

Count of Blois (1102–1152) and Champagne (1125–1152)

Theobald II
- Count of Champagne
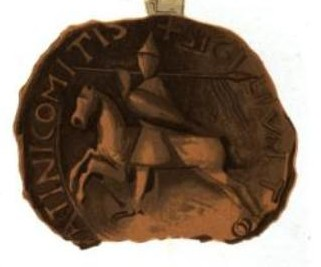
- Theobald's seal
- Predecessor: Hugh
- Successor: Henry I
- Born: 1090
- Died: 10 January 1152
- Noble family: House of Blois; House of Blois-Champagne (founder)
- Spouse: Matilda of Carinthia
- Issue: Henry I, Count of Champagne; Theobald V, Count of Blois; Adela, Queen of France; Stephen I of Sancerre; William White Hands; Agnes; Margaret; Matilda illegitimate Hugh
- Father: Stephen, Count of Blois
- Mother: Adela of Normandy

Theobald the Great (1090 – 10 January 1152) was count of Blois and of Chartres as Theobald IV from 1102 and was Count of Champagne and of Brie as Theobald II from 1125. Theobald held Auxerre, Maligny, Ervy, Troyes and Châteauvillain as fiefs from Odo II, Duke of Burgundy.

== Career ==
Theobald was the son of Count Stephen II of Blois and his wife Adela of Normandy (daughter of William the Conqueror), and he was the elder brother of King Stephen of England.

Although he was the second son, Theobald was appointed above his older brother William. Theobald accompanied his mother throughout their domain on hundreds of occasions and, after her retirement to Marcigney in 1125, he administered the family properties with great skill. Adela died in her beloved convent on 8 March 1137, the year after her son Stephen was crowned king of England.

King Louis VII of France became involved in a war with Theobald by permitting Count Raoul I of Vermandois, seneschal of France, to repudiate his wife Eleanor, sister of Theobald and of King Stephen, in order to marry Petronilla of Aquitaine, sister of Louis VII's own wife, Eleanor. The war, which lasted two years (1142–1144), was marked by the occupation of Champagne by the royal army and the capture of Vitry-le-François, where 1500 people perished in the deliberate burning of the church by Louis.

The scholastic Pierre Abélard, famous for his love affair with and subsequent marriage to his student Héloïse d'Argenteuil, sought asylum in Champagne during Theobald II's reign. Abelard died at Cluny Abbey in Burgundy, a monastery supported by the Thebaudians for many centuries.

== Marriage and issue ==
In 1123 he married Matilda, daughter of Duke Engelbert of Carinthia. Their children were:

- Henry I of Champagne, count of Champagne
- Theobald V of Blois, count of Blois and seneschal of France
- Adela, queen of France as the wife of King Louis VII of France
- Isabella, married 1. Duke Roger III of Apulia d. 1148, 2. William Gouet IV d. 1170
- Marie, married Duke Odo II of Burgundy, became abbess of Fontevrault later in life.
- Stephen I of Sancerre 1133–1191, count of Sancerre and crusader, died at the Siege of Acre
- William White Hands, 1135–1202, archbishop of Reims 1176–1202, Cardinal 1179
- Agnes (d. 1207), dame de Ligny, married Reginald II of Bar (d. 1170).
- Margaret, nun at Fontevrault
- Matilda, married Rotrou IV of Perche

Theobald had an illegitimate son, Hugh (d. 1171), abbot of Lagny near Paris.

== See also ==
- Peace with Honor

== Sources ==
- Baldwin, John W. (2002). Aristocratic Life in Medieval France. Johns Hopkins University.
- Cline, Ruth Harwood (2007). "Abbot Hugh: An Overlooked Brother of Henry I, Count of Champagne". The Catholic Historical Review. 93, No. 3 (July) (3). Catholic University of America Press: 501–516. doi:10.1353/cat.2007.0240. S2CID 159951701.
- Davis, R.H.C. (1967). King Stephen, 1135-1154. University of California Press.
- Dunbabin, Jean (1985). France in the Making, 943-1180. Oxford University Press.
- Fassler, Margot Elsbeth (2010). The Virgin of Chartres: Making History Through Liturgy and the Arts. Yale University Press.
- Kaeuper, Richard W. (2016). Medieval Chivalry. Cambridge University Press.
- LoPrete, Kimberly (2007). Adela, Countess and Lord. Fourcourts Press.

Theobald II of Champagne House of Blois Born: 1090 Died: 10 January 1152
Preceded by Stephen-Henry	Count of Blois, Dunois, and Chartres; 1102–1152	Succeeded by Theobald V
Preceded by Stephen-Henry	Lord of Sancerre; 1102–1152	Succeeded by Stephen I
Preceded by Stephen-Henry	Count of Meaux; 1102–1152	Succeeded by Henry I
Preceded by Hugh	Count of Champagne; 1125–1152	Succeeded by Henry I
