= William of the White Hands =

French cardinal (1135–1202)

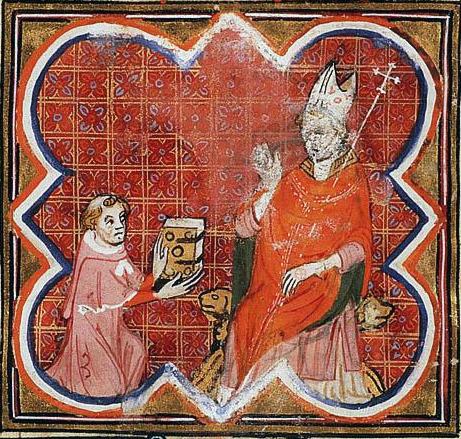
- Petrus Comestor (d. c. 1178) presents his Historia scholastica to Archbishop William of the White Hands.
- Church: Roman Catholic
- Archdiocese: Sens
- Diocese: Chartres

Personal details
- Born: 1135 Brosses
- Died: 7 September 1202 (aged 66–67)

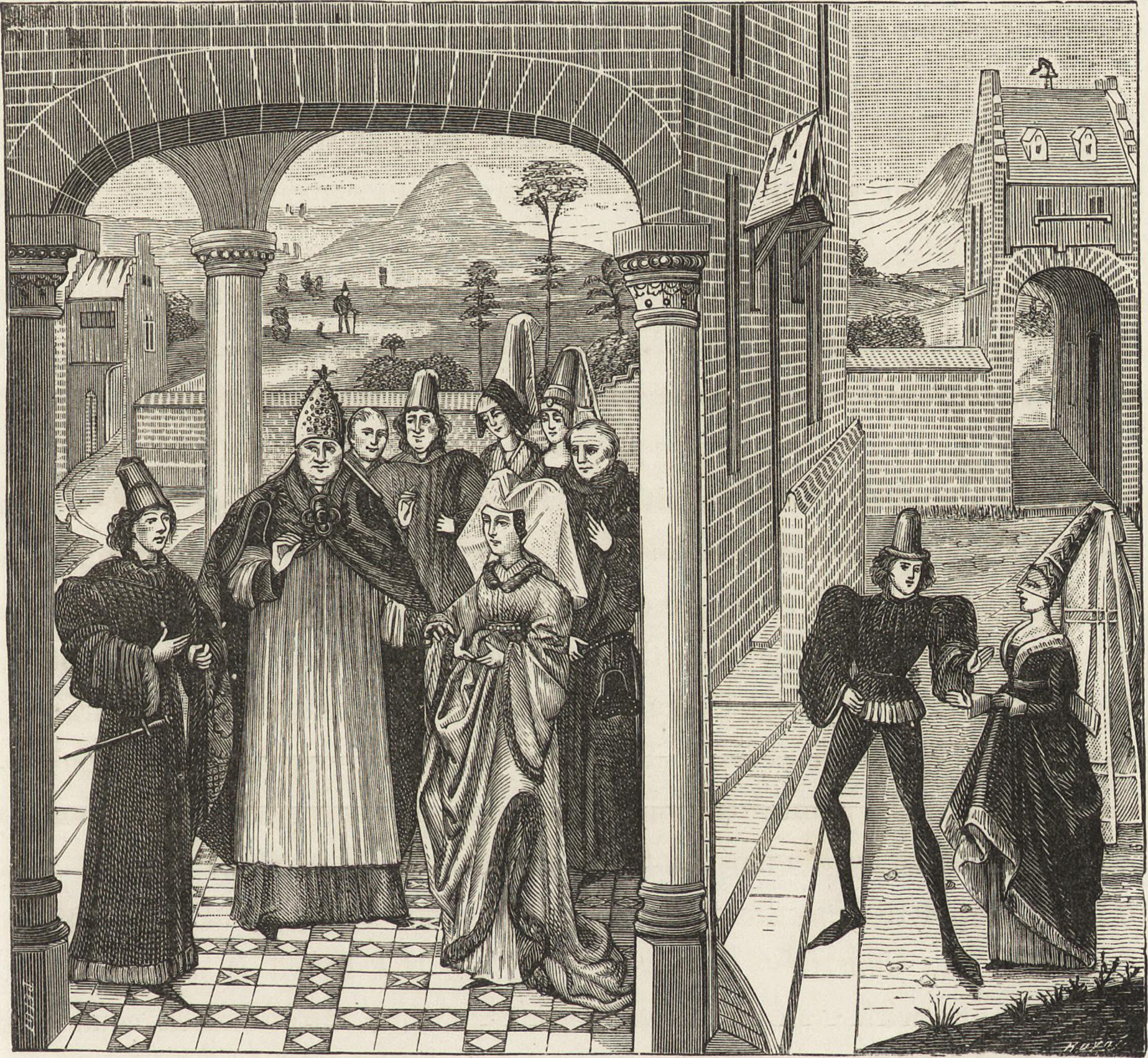
William of the White Hands interposing at the Treaty of Arras, concluded in 1191, between Baldwin V., Count of Hainault, and Matilda of Portugal, Widow of Philip, Count of Flanders.

William of the White Hands (French: Guillaume aux Blanches Mains; 1135–1202), also called William White Hands, was a French cardinal.

William was born in Brosse, Île-de-France, France. He was a son of Theobald the Great, Count of Blois and Count of Champagne, and Matilda of Carinthia.

William served as Bishop of Chartres in 1165, Archbishop of Sens (1169–1176), Archbishop of Reims (1175–1202), and the first Peer of France to bear that title. He anointed his nephew, Philip II of France, as co-king on 1 November 1179 in Rheims. Pope Alexander III created him Cardinal Priest of Santa Sabina in March 1179; as such, he signed the papal bulls between 8 April 1179 and 23 December 1201. He died on 7 September 1202.

William was portrayed by actor Liam O'Callaghan in the 1978 BBC TV drama series The Devil's Crown.

== Sources ==
- Cline, Ruth Harwood (2007). "Abbot Hugh: An Overlooked Brother of Henry I, Count of Champagne". The Catholic Historical Review. 93 (3 (July)). Catholic University of America Press: 501–516. doi:10.1353/cat.2007.0240. S2CID 159951701.
- Crosby, E. (2013). The King's Bishops The Politics of Patronage in England and Normandy, 1066-1216. Palgrave Macmillan.

Catholic Church titles
Preceded by Henry of France	Archbishop of Reims; 1176–1202	Succeeded by Guy Paré
