= Matilda II of Nevers =

Medieval French Countess

Matilda II
- Countess of Nevers, Auxerre anf Tonnerre; Lady of Bourbon
- Born: 1234/5
- Died: 1262 (aged 27–28)
- Noble family: House of Bourbon-Dampierre
- Spouse: Odo, Count of Nevers
- Issue: Yolande II, Countess of Nevers; Margaret, Countess of Tonnerre; Adelaide, Countess of Auxerre
- Father: Archambaud IX of Bourbon
- Mother: Yolande of Chatillon

Matilda II, Countess of Nevers (1234/35–1262), also known as Maud of Dampierre or Mathilda II of Bourbon, was a sovereign Countess of Nevers, Countess of Auxerre, Countess of Tonnerre.

Matilda was a daughter of Archambaud IX of Bourbon and Yolande de Châtillon, Countess of Nevers. As heiress to the counties of Nevers, Auxerre and Tonnerre, she was married off to Odo, the eldest son of Hugh IV, Duke of Burgundy. This marriage was meant to reunite two important counties with the Duchy of Burgundy, but he predeceased his father, and so the duchy passed to his brother Robert II. The county of Nevers was partitioned (Nevers, Tonnerre, Auxerre) among her daughters over the period of ten years.

With Odo, Matilda had four daughters:

- Yolande, Countess of Nevers (1247–1280), married (1) John Tristan, Count of Valois, and (2) Count Robert III of Flanders
- Margaret, Countess of Tonnerre (1250–1308), married King Charles I of Naples
- Adelaide, Countess of Auxerre (1251–1290), married John I of Chalon, Lord of Rochefort
- Joan (1253–1271), died young

== Bibliography ==
- Berman, Constance Hoffman (2018). The White Nuns: Cistercian Abbeys for Women in Medieval France. University of Pennsylvania Press.
- Bubenicek, Michelle (2002). Quand les femmes gouvernent: droit et politique au XIVe siècle:Yolande de Flandre, Droit et politique au XIV siecle. Ecole des Chartes.
- Jamison, Evelyn Mary; Clementi, Dione (1992). Studies on the History of Medieval Sicily and South Italy. Scientia Verlag.
- Le Clech, Sylvie, ed. (2010). Les établissements hospitaliers en France du Moyen Âge au XIXe siècle espaces, objets et populations. Éditions Universitaires de Dijon.

Regnal titles
Preceded by Yolande I	Countess of Nevers; 1254–1262 with Odo	Succeeded by Yolande II
Preceded by Yolande I	Count of Tonnerre; 1254–1262 with Odo	Succeeded by Margaret
Preceded by Yolande I	Count of Auxerre; 1254–1262 with Odo	Succeeded by Adelaide
Preceded by Archambaud IX	Lady of Bourbon; 1249–1262 with Odo	Succeeded by Agnes
