= List of Navarrese royal consorts =

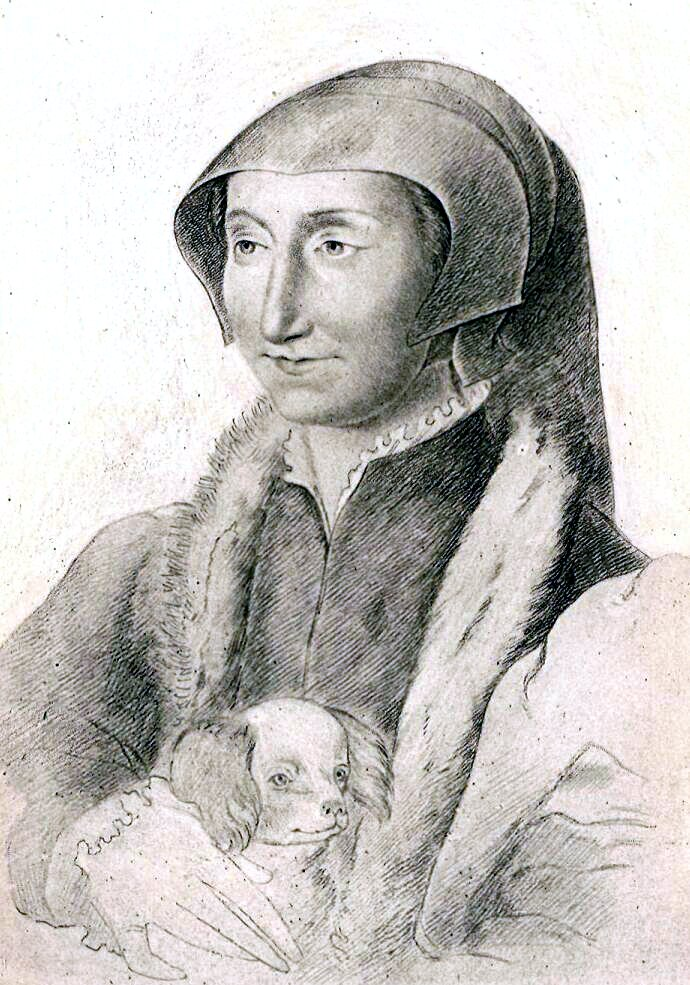
Margaret of Angoulême (1492–1549), Queen of Navarre and Duchess of Alençon

This is a list of those men and women who have been royal consorts of the Kingdom of Navarre. Because the laws of Navarre did not prohibit women from inheriting the crown, on a number of occasions, the Kingdom was inherited or transmitted via heiresses. Thus, whilst most of the royal consorts were women, who held the title of queen consort, several were men, who by their marriages held the title of king, and who are given regnal designations in the lists of Navarrese kings and queens regnant.

Most of these men, although granted power through marriage rather than through inheritance, nonetheless were significant or dominant in their marriages and the rule of the country; indeed, one king by marriage, John II of Navarre (who would late in life also become John II of Aragon by rightful inheritance), husband of Blanche I of Navarre, refused to surrender the crown following her death to their son, Charles of Viana, the rightful heir to the Kingdom, instead retaining the power for himself.

== Vicissitudes of the crown ==
From 1285 to 1328, the crowns of Navarre and France were united by virtue of the marriage of Joan I of Navarre, queen regnant of Navarre and queen consort of France, to King Philip IV of France (who became king-by-marriage of Navarre), and by the succession of their three sons, Louis I/X, Philip II/V, and Charles I/IV. Thus, the wives of these three Kings were Queen-consort of both France and Navarre. However, the inheritance of Navarre by Philip II/V and Charles I/IV following the death of Louis I/X, and his son John I, was, strictly speaking, against the laws of Navarre: that realm did not employ salic law, meaning that the Kingdom should have passed to Jeanne, heiress of Louis, rather than to Philip, the next male heir of Joan I. However, Jeanne being a young child still, and her uncles being of Navarrese blood, she was denied her rights until the death of Charles in 1328, at which point the male line of Joan I died out, and Jeanne was allowed to inherit Navarre. Her husband, Philip of Évreux, became King Philip III of Navarre with his wife due to this.

Thereafter, Navarre on several occasions experienced an extinction of its ruling male line, and consequent absorption or inclusion in the lands of other families. In most cases, the beginning of a new dynasty in Navarre was preceded by the father of the new monarch serving as royal consort—the exception being the De Foix family, none of whom ever served as Navarrese consorts (due to the death of Gaston IV, Count of Foix prior to the inheritance of his wife).

In 1512–13, Upper Navarre, the portion of the Kingdom below the Pyrenees and the independent portion of the Kingdom from which the crown derived, was occupied by Spanish forces under Ferdinand the Catholic, the son of John II, and husband of Germaine de Foix (an heiress of Navarre), driving out the king and queen, John III and Catherine I. Ferdinand was proclaimed King of Navarre by the cortes there; his wife became queen consort of the realm, and thereafter the de facto queens consort of Navarre are identical with the queens consort of Spain. John and Catherine maintained claims to Navarre, which were inherited by their heirs, and their line continued to use the titles of King and Queen of Navarre; however, all that remained to them were the feudal lands they held from the French crown, and they ceased to be monarchs other than by right.

The final dynastic change was the marriage of Jeanne III to Antoine de Bourbon, an heir to the French throne, and the subsequent succession to the throne of their son, Henry III. He later became King of France as Henry IV, and French and Navarrese queens consort once again become one and the same. However, the Navarrese crown and lands were merged into the French crown in 1620, and thereafter the French queens consort, though honorifically still queens consort of Navarre, ceased to be so in any real sense.

== House of Íñiguez (c. 824 – 905) ==
Name	House	Birth	Marriage	Became Consort	Coronation	Ceased to be Consort	Death	Spouse
perhaps Urraca								García Íñiguez
Auria				880				Fortún Garcés the One-Eyed
Name	House	Birth	Marriage	Became consort	Coronation	Ceased to be consort	Death	Spouse

== House of Jiménez (905–1234) ==
Picture	Name	Father	Birth	Marriage	Became Consort	Coronation	Ceased to be Consort	Death	Spouse
	Toda Aznárez	Aznar Sánchez, Lord of Larraún (Íñiguez)	885	-	905 husband's accession	-	11 December 925 husband's death	after 970	Sancho I Garcés
	Sancha Aznárez (uncertain)	Aznar Sánchez, Lord of Larraún (Íñiguez)	-	-		-		-	Jimeno Garcés
	Andregoto Galíndez	Galindo Aznárez II, Count of Aragon (Aragon)	900s	after 9 March 933		-	940 repudiated	972	García Sánchez I
	Theresa of León	Ramiro II of León (Astur-Leonese)	928	943, or before		-	22 February 970 husband's death	after September 957	García Sánchez I
	Urraca Fernández	Fernán González, Count of Castile (Castile)	920/35	962	22 February 970 husband's accession	-	December 994 husband's death	after 1007	Sancho II Garcés Abarca
	Jimena Fernández	Fernando Bermúdez de Cea	970s	by August 981	December 994 husband's accession	-	1004 husband's death	after 1035	García Sánchez II
	Muniadona	García Sánchez, Count of Castile (Castile)	990/5	before 27 June 1011		-	18 October 1035 husband's death	after 13 July 1066	Sancho III Garcés
	Stephanie	Ramon Borrell, Count of Barcelona or Bernard-Roger, Count of Bigorre	-	1038		-	1 September 1054 husband's death	after 1066	García Sánchez III
	Placentia	of French or Norman origins	-	after 1068		-	4 June 1076 husband's death	after 14 April 1088	Sancho IV Garcés
	Felicia of Roucy	Hilduin IV, Count of Roucy (Montdidier)	1060	1076		-	4 June 1094 husband's death	3 May 1123	Sancho V Ramírez
	Agnes of Aquitaine	William VIII, Duke of Aquitaine (Ramnulfids)	end 1072	January 1086	4 June 1094 husband's accession	-	6 June 1097		Peter I
	Bertha of Aragon	of Italian origins	1075	16 August 1097		-	28 September 1104 husband's death	before 1111	Peter I
	Urraca of León and Castile	Alfonso VI of León and Castile (Jiménez)	April 1079	October 1109		-	1115 marriage annulled	8 March 1126	Alfonso I
	Margaret of L'Aigle	Gilbert of L'Aigle	1104	after 1130	1134 husband's accession	-	25 May 1141		García Ramírez
	Urraca the Asturian	Alfonso VII of León and Castile (Ivrea)	1132	24 June 1144		-	21 November 1150 husband's death	26 October 1164	García Ramírez
	Sancha of Castile	Alfonso VII of León and Castile (Ivrea)	1139	20 July 1153		-	5 August 1177		Sancho VI Garcés
	Constance of Toulouse	Raymond VI, Count of Toulouse (Rouergue)	1180	1195		-	1200 marriage annulled	after 12 May 1260	Sancho VII Sánchez

== House of Champagne (1234–1284) ==
Picture	Arms	Name	Father	Birth	Marriage	Became Consort	Coronation	Ceased to be Consort	Death	Spouse
		Margaret of Bourbon	Archambaud VIII of Bourbon (Bourbon-Dampierre)	1211	22 September 1232	7 April 1234 husband's accession	-	8 July 1253 husband's death	12 April 1256	Theobald I
		Isabella of France	Louis IX of France (Capet)	2 March 1241	6 April 1255		-	4 December 1270 husband's death	17 April 1271	Theobald II
		Blanche of Artois	Robert I, Count of Artois (Artois)	1248	1269	4 December 1270 husband's accession	-	22 July 1274 husband's death	2 May 1302	Henry I

== House of Capet (1284–1349) ==
Picture	Arms	Name	Father	Birth	Marriage	Became Consort	Coronation	Ceased to be Consort	Death	Spouse
		Margaret of Burgundy	Robert II, Duke of Burgundy (Burgundy)	1290	23 September 1305		-	14 August 1315		Louis I
		Clementia of Hungary	Charles Martel of Anjou (Anjou)	February 1293	19 August 1315		24 August 1315	5 June 1316 husband's death	12 October 1328	Louis I
		Joan II, Countess of Burgundy	Otto IV, Count of Burgundy (Chalon)	15 January 1292	January 1307	20 November 1316 husband's accession	9 January 1317	3 January 1322 husband's death	21 January 1330	Philip II
		Blanche of Burgundy	Otto IV, Count of Burgundy (Chalon)	1296	20 May 1308	3 January 1322 husband's accession	Never crowned	19 May 1322 marriage annulled by the Pope	29 April 1326	Charles I
		Marie of Luxembourg	Henry VII, Holy Roman Emperor (Luxembourg)	1304	21 September 1322		15 May 1323	26 March 1324		Charles I
		Jeanne d'Évreux	Louis, Count of Évreux (Évreux)	1310	5 July 1325		11 May 1326	1 February 1328 husband's death	4 March 1371	Charles I

== House of Évreux (1328–1441) ==
Picture	Arms	Name	Father	Birth	Marriage	Became Consort	Coronation	Ceased to be Consort	Death	Spouse
		Joan of Valois	John II of France (Valois)	24 June 1343	12 February 1352		-	3 November 1373		Charles II
		Eleanor of Castile	Henry II of Castile (Trastámara)	after 1363	27 May 1375	1 January 1387 husband's accession	-	27 February 1416		Charles III
		John II of Navarre	Ferdinand I of Antequera (Trastámara)	29 June 1398	1419	8 September 1425 wife's accession	-	20 January 1479		Blanche I

== House of Trastámara (1425–1479) ==
Picture	Arms	Name	Father	Birth	Marriage	Became Consort	Coronation	Ceased to be Consort	Death	Spouse
		Agnes of Cleves de jure	Adolph I, Duke of Cleves (La Marck)	24 March 1422	30 September 1439	1 April 1441 husband's accession	-	6 April 1448		Charles IV de jure
		Juana Enríquez de facto	Fadrique Enríquez, Count of Melba and Rueda (Enríquez)	1425	1 April 1444		-	13 February 1468		John II de facto

== House of Foix (1483–1516) ==
Picture	Arms	Name	Father	Birth	Marriage	Became Consort	Coronation	Ceased to be Consort	Death	Spouse
		John III of Albret	Alain I of Albret (Albret)	1469	14 June 1484		-	17 June 1516		Catherine I

In 1512, Ferdinand II of Aragon, the Catholic, militarily conquered the Kingdom of Navarre, incorporating it in 1516 into the Crown of Castile and expelling Queen Catherine and King John. The House of Albret (1516–1572) and the House of Bourbon (1572–1620) kept using the title of King of Navarre, but ruled only a small territory north of the Pyrenees mountains. The rest of the country was ruled by the Spanish Habsburg Kings.

== House of Albret (1516–1572) ==
Picture	Arms	Name	Father	Birth	Marriage	Became Consort	Coronation	Ceased to be Consort	Death	Spouse
		Margaret of Angoulême	Charles, Count of Angoulême (Valois-Angoulême)	11 April 1492	24 January 1527		-	21 December 1549		Henry II only the north

== House of Bourbon (1572–1620) ==
Picture	Arms	Name	Father	Birth	Marriage	Became Consort	Coronation	Ceased to be Consort	Death	Spouse
		Margaret of France	Henry II of France (Valois-Angoulême)	14 May 1553	18 August 1572		-	1599 marriage annulled	27 March 1615	Henry III only the north
		Marie de' Medici	Francesco I de' Medici, Grand Duke of Tuscany (Medici)	26 April 1575	5 October 1600		13 May 1610	14 May 1610 husband's death	3 July 1642	Henry III only the north
		Anne of Austria	Philip III of Spain (Habsburg)	22 September 1601	24 November 1615		-	20 October 1620; Navarre merged into France	20 January 1666	Louis II only the north

- For the later consorts, see the List of French royal consorts and List of Spanish royal consorts

== Monarchs of Navarre since 1620 ==
Henry III of Navarre became Henry IV of France and thereafter the crown of Navarre passed to the kings of France. In 1620, the Kingdom was merged into France, although the French kings continued to use the title King of Navarre until 1791. The title was revived from 1814 to 1830 during the Restoration. In Spain (which is the actual country to where most of the territories of historical Navarre belong), the monarch uses the title King of Navarre as part of his more extended titulary.

== See also ==
- List of Navarrese monarchs
- List of Aragonese royal consorts
- List of Asturian royal consorts
- List of Castilian royal consorts
- List of French royal consorts
- List of Galician royal consorts
- List of Leonese royal consorts
- List of Spanish royal consorts
- List of consorts of Champagne
- List of consorts of Foix

== Sources ==
- Marek, Miroslav. "Rulers of Navarre". Genealogy.EU.
