= Yolande of Nevers =

Yolande
- Countess of Nevers, suo jure
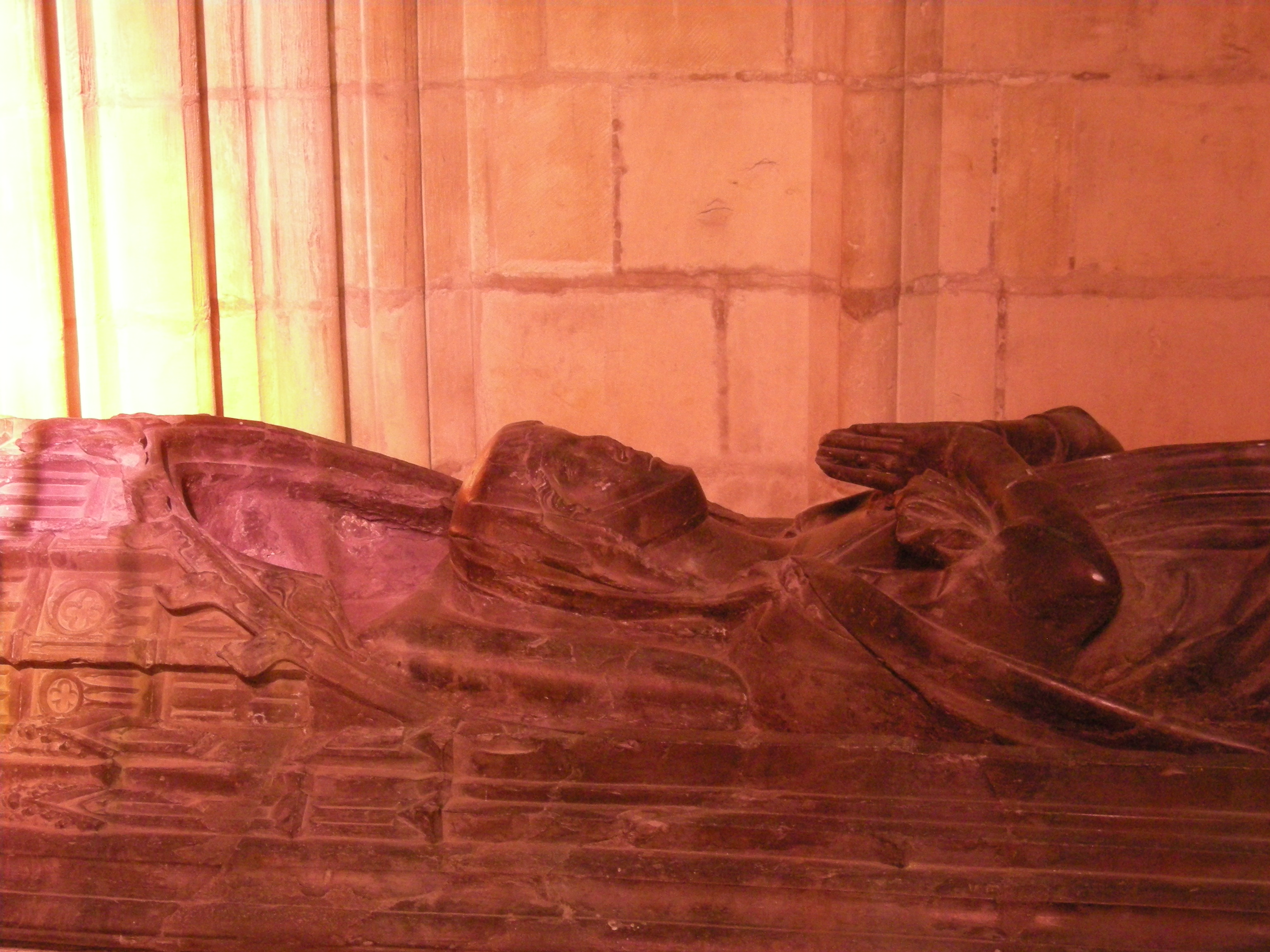
- Tomb effigy of Yolande II
- Born: December 1247; Nevers
- Died: 2 June 1280 (aged 32)
- Noble family: House of Burgundy
- Spouse: John Tristan, Count of Valois (m. 1266; died 1270) Robert III, Count of Flanders (m. 1271)
- Issue Detail: Louis I, Count of Nevers; Robert
- Father: Odo, Count of Nevers
- Mother: Matilda II, Countess of Nevers

Yolande (French: Yolande de Bourgogne), (December 1247 – 2 June 1280) was the countess of Nevers between 1262 and 1280.

== Life ==
Yolande was the daughter of Matilda II of Nevers and Odo of Burgundy.

On the death of her mother in 1262, Yolande, became the titular countess of Nevers, Tonnerre and Auxerre. However, in 1273 the arbitrators at the Parlement de Paris decided that the inheritance would be split among the sisters: Yolande got Nevers and the Château de Druyes, while her sisters Margaret and Adelaide inherited Tonnerre and Auxerre, respectively. Their aunt Agnes received the Bourbon fiefs.

Her first marriage was to Count John Tristan of Valois, son of King Louis IX of France and Margaret of Provence, in June 1265; they had no children, and he died of dysentery in 1270 at Tunis while on the Eighth Crusade.

Upon the death of her paternal grandfather, Duke Hugh IV of Burgundy, in 1272, after their marriage in Auxerre the same year, Yolande and her influential second husband, Count Robert III of Flanders, claimed the Duchy of Burgundy on the basis of primogeniture, Yolande being the firstborn child of Hugh's deceased eldest son. Hugh IV, however, in his will named his third son, Robert II, as heir to the duchy while giving other fiefs to his granddaughters. King Philip III of France, one of the arbitrators, decided in favor of Yolande's uncle.

== Issue ==
Yolande and Robert III, Count of Flanders had:

- Louis I (1272–1322), Count of Nevers and of Réthel.
- Robert (d. 1331), Seigneur of Marle and of Cassel, married (1323) Joan of Brittany (1294–1364), daughter of Arthur II of Brittany, and Yolande, countess of Montfort
- Joan (d. 1333), married in 1288 Enguerrand IV of Coucy (d. 1310), Seigneur of Coucy and Viscount of Meaux
- Yolande (d. 1313), married in about 1287 Wautier II of Enghien (d. 1309)
- Matilda, married in about 1314 to Matthieu of Lorraine (d. 1330), lord of Warsberg

Yolande of Nevers House of Burgundy Born: December 1247 Died: 2 June 1280
Regnal titles
Preceded by Matilda II and Odo	Countess of Nevers; 1262–1280	Succeeded by Louis I
