= Margaret of Bourbon, Queen of Navarre =

Queen of Navarre from 1234 to 1253

Margaret of Bourbon
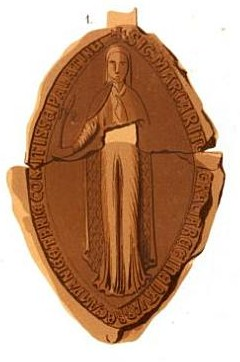

Queen consort of Navarre
- Tenure: 1234–1253
- Born: c. 1217
- Died: 12 April 1256 (aged 38–39)
- Spouse: Theobald I of Navarre
- Issue: Theobald II of Navarre; Beatrice of Navarre; Henry I of Navarre
- House: House of Bourbon-Dampierre
- Father: Archambaud VIII of Bourbon
- Mother: Alice of Forez

Margaret of Bourbon (French: Marguerite; c. 1217 – 12 April 1256) was Queen of Navarre and Countess of Champagne from 1234 until 1253 as the third wife of Theobald I of Navarre. After her husband's death, she ruled both the kingdom and the county as regent for three years in the name of their son, Theobald II of Navarre between 1253 and 1256.

== Early life ==
Margaret was born into the House of Dampierre, the eldest daughter of Archambaud VIII, Lord of Bourbon. Her mother was her father's first wife, Alice of Forez, daughter of Guigues III, Count of Forez. Archambaud was the constable of Count Theobald IV of Champagne.

== Queen ==
Margaret was 15 years old when, on 12 September 1232, she became the third wife of the 32-year-old recently widowed Count Theobald. His first wife, Gertrude of Dagsburg, had been repudiated and already deceased, while the second, Agnes of Beaujeu, died leaving only a daughter, Blanche. Their marriage was one of only two unions of the counts of Champagne with a significant age disparity between spouses, the other one being the marriage of Henry I of Champagne and Marie of France. Margaret brought a large dowry, but an unusual clause in her marriage contract stipulated that only a prorated part of it would be returned to her father in case of her death without issue within the first nine years of the marriage and nothing if she died after nine years had passed. Only if the union ended in annulment, as her parents' and Theobald's first marriage had, was the entire sum to be returned.

Margaret's marriage lasted twenty years, during which she delivered seven children. In 1234, she became Queen of Navarre when Theobald inherited the kingdom from his maternal uncle, Sancho VII. Little is known about Margaret's life as queen consort, which appears to have been spent in relative obscurity.

== Regency ==
Her husband's death in 1253, however, brought her into the spotlight: their son, Theobald II of Navarre, was 14, while the laws of the realm required the king to be 21 to take control of his inheritance. She immediately had to deal with a succession crisis in the kingdom. Although her husband, also Count of Champagne, had resided in Navarre much of the time after his accession to the royal throne, the nobility of the kingdom were unwilling to accept his son as their king. Margaret prevented the outbreak of an open rebellion by travelling with Theobald to the capital, Pamplona, and by allying with the neighbouring Kingdom of Aragon. She also inherited her husband's long-standing dispute with the Knights Templar, who had bought much feudal property in Champagne despite his disapproval. Margaret resolutely prohibited them from acquiring any more land within the county.

In 1254, Margaret was persuaded by her son to arrange a marriage for him with Isabella, daughter of King Louis IX of France. King Theobald II reached the age of majority in 1256. No longer regent, Queen Margaret retired to her large dower lands, consisting of seven castellanies (as much as a third of the comital revenues), where she spent the rest of her life. She died in Provins and was buried at the Saint Joseph de Clairval Abbey in Flavigny-sur-Ozerain.

== Issue ==
- Eleanor, died young
- Theobald II of Navarre
- Peter (died in 1265)
- Margaret, who in 1255 married Frederick III, Duke of Lorraine and bore him Theobald II of Lorraine
- Beatrice of Navarre, Duchess of Burgundy married Hugh IV Duke of Burgundy
- Henry I of Navarre married Blanche of Artois

== Sources ==
- Evergates, Theodore (2011). Aristocratic Women in Medieval France. University of Pennsylvania Press.
- Pippenger, Randall Todd, ed. (2022). Tales of a Minstrel of Reims in the Thirteenth Century. Translated by Rosenberg, Samuel N. Catholic University of America Press.

Margaret of Bourbon, Queen of Navarre House of Dampierre Born: 1211 Died: 12 April 1256
Royal titles
Preceded by Constance of Toulouse	Queen consort of Navarre; 1234–1253	Succeeded by Isabella of France
