= Countess of Champagne =

== House of Champagne, 1234–1285 ==
Picture	Name	Father	Birth	Marriage	Became Countess	Ceased to be Countess	Death	Spouse
	Constance of France	Philip I of France (Capet)	1078	1093/95		25 December 1104 annulled on grounds of consanguinity	14 September 1126	Hugh I
	Isabelle of Mâcon	Stephen I, Count of Burgundy (Ivrea)	1090/95	1110		- repudiated	after 1125	Hugh I
	Matilda of Carinthia	Engelbert, Duke of Carinthia (Sponheim)	1106/08	1123		1151 husband's death	13 December 1160/61	Theobald II
	Marie of France	Louis VII of France (Capet)	1145-3	1164		17 March 1181 husband's death	3/11 March 1198	Henry I
	Isabella I of Jerusalem	Amalric I of Jerusalem (Anjou)	1172	5 May 1192		10 September 1197 husband's death	5 April 1205	Henry II
	Blanche of Navarre	Sancho VI of Navarre (Jiménez)	after 1177	1 July 1199		24 May 1201 husband's death	12/14 March 1229	Theobald III
	Gertrude of Dagsburg	Albert II, Count of Dagsburg and Metz (Dagsburg)	1190 or May 1205	mid-May 1220		1222 repudiated	30 March 1225	Theobald IV
	Agnes of Beaujeu	Guichard IV, Sire of Beaujeu	1200	1222		11 July 1231		Theobald IV
	Margaret of Bourbon	Archambaud VIII of Bourbon (Bourbon-Dampierre)	1211	22 September 1232		8 July 1253 husband's death	12 April 1256	Theobald IV
	Isabella of France	Louis IX of France (Capet)	2 March 1241	6 April 1255		4 December 1270 husband's death	17 April 1271	Theobald V
	Blanche of Artois	Robert I, Count of Artois (Artois)	1248	1269	4 December 1270 husband's accession	22 July 1274 husband's death	2 May 1302	Henry III

== House of Capet, 1284-1349 ==
Picture	Name	Father	Birth	Marriage	Became Countess	Ceased to be Countess	Death	Spouse
	Margaret of Burgundy	Robert II, Duke of Burgundy (Burgundy)	1290	23 September 1305		14 August 1315		Louis I
	Clémence d'Anjou	Charles Martel of Anjou (Anjou)	February 1293	19 August 1315		5 June 1316 husband's death	12 October 1328	Louis I
	Joan II, Countess of Burgundy	Otto IV, Count of Burgundy (Chalon)	15 January 1292	January 1307	20 November 1316 husband's accession	3 January 1322 husband's death	21 January 1330	Philip II
	Blanche of Burgundy	Otto IV, Count of Burgundy (Chalon)	1296	20 May 1308	3 January 1322 husband's accession	3 January 1322 marriage annulled by the Pope	29 April 1326	Charles I
	Marie of Luxembourg	Henry VII, Holy Roman Emperor (Luxembourg)	1304	21 September 1322		26 March 1324		Charles I
	Jeanne d'Évreux	Louis, Count of Évreux (Évreux)	1310	5 July 1325		1 February 1328 husband's death	4 March 1371	Charles I
