= Yolande of Dreux, Duchess of Burgundy =

Duchess of Burgundy from 1229 to 1248

Yolande of Dreux

Duchess consort of Burgundy
- Tenure: 1229 – 30 October 1248
- Born: 1212
- Died: 1248 (aged 35–36)
- Spouse: Hugh IV of Burgundy
- Issue: Margaret, Lady of Molinot; Odo, Count of Nevers; John; Adelaide, Duchess of Brabant; Robert II, Duke of Burgundy
- House: Dreux
- Father: Robert III of Dreux
- Mother: Alianor de St. Valéry

Yolande of Dreux (1212–1248) was Duchess of Burgundy as the first wife of Hugh IV of Burgundy (duke of Burgundy between 1218 and 1271).

She was the daughter of Count Robert III "Gasteblé" of Dreux and of Braine, and Alianor de St. Valéry.

== Issue ==
Yolande's children with Hugh IV of Burgundy included:

- Margaret, Lady of Molinot (1229–1277), who married 1st(after 1239) William III (d. 1256), lord of Mont St Jean and 2nd Guy VI (d. 1263), viscount of Limoges
- Odo, count of Nevers and Auxerre (1230–1266)
- John (1231–1268), who married Agnes and had Beatrice of Burgundy, heiress of Bourbon
- Alice (1233–1273), who married Henry III, Duke of Brabant
- Robert II, Duke of Burgundy (1248–1306)

== Sources ==
- Bubenicek, Michelle (2002). Quand les femmes gouvernent: droit et politique au XIVe siècle:Yolande de Flandre, Droit et politique au XIV siecle (in French). Ecole des Chartes.
- Lower, Michael (2005). The Barons' Crusade: A Called to Arms and Its Consequences. University of Pennsylvania Press.
- Morvan, Frederic (2009). La Chevalerie bretonne et la formation de l'armee ducale, 1260-1341 (in French). Presses Universitaires de Rennes.

Yolande of Dreux, Duchess of Burgundy House of Dreux Cadet branch of the Capetian dynasty Born: 1212 Died: 1248
Royal titles
Preceded by Alice of Vergy	Duchess consort of Burgundy; 1218–1248	Succeeded by Beatrice of Navarre
