= Beatrice of Navarre, Duchess of Burgundy =

Duchess of Burgundy from 1258 to 1272

Beatrice of Navarre
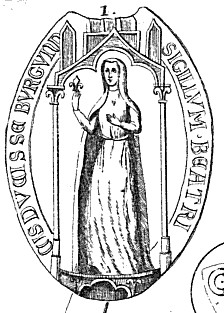
- Seal of Beatrice
- Born: 1242
- Died: 1295 (aged 52–53)
- Spouse: Hugh IV, Duke of Burgundy
- Issue: Hugh, Viscount of Avallon; Beatrice, Lady of Grignon; Isabella of Burgundy, Queen of Germany; Margaret, Dame de Vitteaux; Joan
- House: House of Blois; House of Blois-Champagne; House of Blois-Navarre
- Father: Theobald I of Navarre
- Mother: Margaret of Bourbon

Beatrice of Navarre (1242? – 1295), was Duchess of Burgundy, by marriage to Hugh IV, Duke of Burgundy. She was a daughter of Theobald I of Navarre and his third wife Margaret of Bourbon. Her siblings included Theobald II of Navarre and Henry I of Navarre. She is also known as Beatrix of Champagne.

== Life ==
Beatrice was married to Hugh IV, Duke of Burgundy. Upon the marriage, Beatrice became Duchess of Burgundy.

Beatrice’s son Hugh did not succeed his father because Hugh IV had another son, Robert, by his marriage to Yolande de Dreux. Hugh IV died in 1271 and was succeeded by Robert. After her husband died, Beatrice retired to the château de l'Isle-sur-Serein. She quarrelled with her stepson Robert, and asked for protection from Philip II of France. She also renounced any claim to the succession of her brother in 1273.

== Issue ==
Hugh and Beatrice had the following children:

- Hugh (died in 1288), viscount of Avallon, married Margaret de Salins
- Beatrice, Lady of Grignon, married Hugh XIII of Lusignan
- Isabella of Burgundy, Queen of Germany
- Margaret, Dame de Vitteaux (died after 1300), married John I of Chalon-Arlay
- Joan, a nun

Beatrice of Navarre, Duchess of Burgundy House of Champagne Born: 1242 Died: July 1295
Royal titles
Preceded by Yolande of Dreux	Duchess consort of Burgundy; 1258–1272	Succeeded by Agnes of France
