= House of Bourbon-Dampierre =

The coat of arms used by the House of Bourbon-Dampierre

The House of Bourbon-Dampierre refers to a noble dynasty that emerged from the marriage of Guy II of Dampierre with Mathilde of Bourbon in 1197. The male line of this house ended in 1249, while the female line persisted until 1287.

== History ==
Through the marriage of their last descendant, Mathilde (Mahaut) of Bourbon, with Guy of Dampierre, the territories of Bourbon went to one of the branches of the House of Dampierre in 1196. The arms of the House of Dampierre, nowadays extinct, were "from gules to two leopards of gold, with baron's crown" (De gueules à deux léopards d'or, avec couronne de baron), however, they took over the arms of the House of Bourbon, which were "from gold to the lion of gules, and to the orle of eight shells of azure" (d'or au lion de gueules, et à l'orle de huit coquilles d'azur).

The son of Guy of Dampierre and Mathilde of Bourbon, Archambaud VIII, took the name and the arms of his mother, i.e. "of Bourbon", a custom in which he was followed by his descendants, the male line becoming extinct in 1249 and the female line dying out in 1287. Through the marriage of the last female of that line, Agnès of Bourbon-Dampierre († 1287), with John of Burgundy, her House merged with the House of Burgundy, and to their daughter Beatrix (1257-1310), Lady of Bourbon. Finally, it was passed on to Beatrix's husband, Robert, Count of Clermont (1256-1317), the 13th and last child of Louis IX, king of France, who was thus the first prince of France to take possession of the territory of Bourbon (in 1310) and founded the Capetian House of Bourbon.

== Genealogy ==
- Mathilde (Mahaut), Lady of Bourbon († 1218), granddaughter of Archambault VII, Lord of Bourbon, married Guy II of Dampierre, Marshall of Champagne († 1216)
  - Archambaud VIII the Great, Lord of Bourbon († 1242)
    - Archambaud IX the Young, Lord of Bourbon († 1249), married Yolande of Châtillon, Countess of Nevers, Auxerre and Tonnerre
      - Mahaut II, Lady of Bourbon († 1262) married Eudes of Burgundy († 1266)
        - Capetian House of Burgundy
      - Agnès, Countess of Nevers, Auxerre and Tonnerre († 1288) married John of Burgundy, Lord of Charolais († 1268)
        - Beatrix of Burgundy married Robert, Count of Clermont
