= Archambaud IX of Bourbon =

Sire of Bourbonnais

- Died: 15 January 1249; Cyprus
- Noble family: House of Bourbon-Dampierre
- Spouse: Yolande I, Countess of Nevers
- Issue: Matilda II, Countess of Nevers; Agnes, Lady of Bourbon
- Father: Archambaud VIII of Bourbon
- Mother: Alice de Forez

Archambaud IX of Bourbon (died 15 January 1249), called "Le Jeune" ("The Young"), was a ruler (sire) of Bourbonnais in the modern region of Auvergne, France.

He was the son of Archambaud VIII of Bourbon. He married Yolande I, Countess of Nevers. They had:

- Matilda II, Countess of Nevers (d. 1262)
- Agnes, Lady of Bourbon (1237 – 7 September 1288); married Jean of Burgundy, Count of Charolais, the son of Hugh IV, Duke of Burgundy.

He died in Cyprus on 15 January 1249 en route to Egypt in support of the Seventh Crusade.

== See also ==
- House of Dampierre

== Sources ==
- Berman, Constance Hoffman (2018). The White Nuns: Cistercian Abbeys for Women in Medieval France. University of Pennsylvania Press.
- Bubenicek, Michelle (2002). Quand les femmes gouvernent: droit et politique au XIVe siècle:Yolande de Flandre, Droit et politique au XIV siecle (in French). Ecole des Chartes.
- Devailly, Guy (1973). Le Berry du X siecle au milieu du XIII (in French). Mouton & Co.
- Strayer, Joseph R. (1969). "The Crusades of Louis IX". In Setton, Kenneth M.; Wolff, Robert Lee; Hazard, Harry W. (eds.). A History of the Crusades. Vol. II. University of Wisconsin Press.

Archambaud IX of Bourbon House of Dampierre Died: 15 January 1249
Preceded by Archambaud VIII	Sire de Bourbon; 1242–1249	Succeeded by Matilda II
