= Agnes of Dampierre =

- Lady of Bourbon
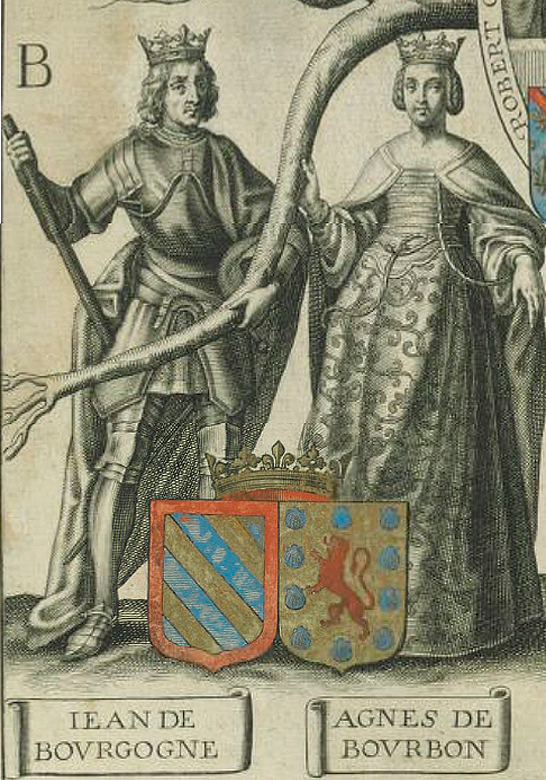
- Predecessor: Archambaud IX de Dampierre
- Successor: Louis I, le Boiteux
- Born: Agnes; 1237
- Died: 7 September 1288 (aged 50–51)
- Spouse: John of Burgundy
- Issue: Beatrix of Bourbon
- House: House of Bourbon-Dampierre (by birth); House of Burgundy (by marriage)
- Father: Archambaud IX of Bourbon
- Mother: Yolande I, Countess of Nevers

Agnes of Dampierre (1237 – 7 September 1288) was Lady of Bourbon and heiress of all Bourbon estates. She was the daughter of Archambaud IX de Dampierre and Yolande I, Countess of Nevers. She married John of Burgundy, the son of Hugh IV, Duke of Burgundy. Their daughter, Beatrix of Bourbon, married Robert, Count of Clermont in 1272 and their eldest son Louis I, le Boiteux became the first Duke of Bourbon.

== See also ==
- Dukes of Bourbon family tree

== Source ==
- Berman, Constance Hoffman (2018). The White Nuns: Cistercian Abbeys for Women in Medieval France. University of Pennsylvania Press.
- Devailly, Guy (1973). Le Berry du X siecle au milieu du XIII (in French). Mouton & Co.
- Jackson-Laufer, Guida Myrl (1999). Women rulers throughout the ages: an illustrated guide (2 ed.). Santa Barbara, California: ABC-CLIO. ISBN 978-1-57607-091-8.

Agnes of Dampierre House of Dampierre Born: 1237 Died: 7 September 1288
Preceded by Matilda II	Dame de Bourbon; 1262–1288	Succeeded by Beatrix
