= Blanche of Artois =

Queen of Navarre from 1270 to 1274

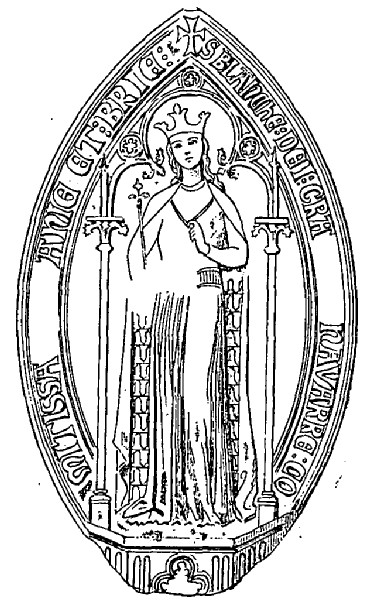
- Seal of Queen Blanche

Queen consort of Navarre; Countess consort of Champagne
- Tenure: 4 December 1270 – 22 July 1274
- Coronation: May 1273
- Born: c. 1248
- Died: 2 May 1302 (aged 53–54); Paris, Kingdom of France
- Burial: Cordeliers Convent, Paris
- Spouse: Henry I of Navarre; Edmund Crouchback
- Issue: Theobald of Navarre; Joan I of Navarre; Thomas, 2nd Earl of Lancaster; Henry, 3rd Earl of Lancaster; John, Lord of Beaufort
- House: Artois
- Father: Robert I, Count of Artois
- Mother: Matilda of Brabant

Blanche of Artois (Basque: Blanka; c. 1248 – 2 May 1302) was Queen of Navarre and Countess of Champagne and Brie during her marriage to Henry I of Navarre. After his death, she became regent in the name of their infant daughter, Joan I. She passed on the regency of Navarre to Philip III of France, her cousin and her daughter's prospective father-in-law, but retained the administration of Champagne. She later shared the government of Champagne with her second husband, Edmund, until her daughter reached the age of majority.

== Queenship ==
Blanche was the elder child and only daughter of Robert I, Count of Artois, and Matilda of Brabant. A fraternal niece of King Louis IX of France, Blanche was probably born in 1248. By February 1269, having received a papal dispensation, she was married to Henry, the brother of King Theobald II of Navarre. The ceremony took place in Melun near Paris. Her brother-in-law, in turn, was married to her cousin, Isabella of France. Henry was governing his brother's realm when King Theobald and Queen Isabella left to join the Eighth Crusade. When the king died in December 1270, followed by his widow within a few months, Blanche's husband became King of Navarre and Count of Champagne.

King Henry and Queen Blanche were a young couple with a son, Theobald, and the future of the House of Blois seemed bright. In 1273, however, they lost their son in an accident when the young Theobald was dropped by his nurse over the castle battlements. A daughter named Joan, born the same year, remained the royal couple's only child and was recognized as heir presumptive by the King and the Estates. The following year, on 22 July, King Henry himself died. The death of two kings within five years and accession of an infant queen, the first woman to rule Navarre and Champagne alike, triggered a political crisis.

== Regency ==
Now queen dowager, Blanche became regent for her daughter. Her regency in Champagne was preceded by several long regencies of widowed mothers, but this was the first regency for a female ruler. The neighbouring kingdoms of Castile and Aragon moved to exploit the precarious situation. Both Alfonso X of Castile and Peter III of Aragon wanted to secure Navarre for their respective houses either by marriage with Joan or by force. While Peter contemplated a marriage with a cousin of Joan, Alfonso moved his army to Navarre and started besieging Viana. The citizens loyally defended the city, for which Queen Blanche thanked them by granting special privileges.

Blanche remained in Pamplona at least until 14 April, but then fled the kingdom, taking Joan with her, on the pretext of visiting her daughter's fiefs in the north of France. In reality, she sought protection from her cousin, King Philip III of France. In November, she paid homage to him for her daughter's French possessions. The almost immediate departure of both the monarch and the regent only complicated the situation in Navarre. In May 1275, Queen Blanche signed the Treaty of Orléans, by which she promised Joan's hand in marriage to one of the older two sons of the King of France, either Louis or Philip. The elder died within a year, and Philip was left as both heir to the French throne and Joan's bridegroom. Blanche administered Joan's territories from Paris, appointing governors for Navarre. Later this role was taken over by Joan's prospective father-in-law, while Blanche retained the administration of Champagne and Brie.

== English marriage ==
Between 28 July and 29 October 1276, in Paris, Blanche became the second wife of Edmund Crouchback, brother of King Edward I of England. The marriage was orchestrated by the dowager queen of France Margaret of Provence, who wished to secure a wealthy bride for her nephew. There are also reports, however, that the two married out of mutual attraction. Edmund joined Blanche in administering Champagne and Brie. Edmund and Blanche had four children: Mary, who died young, Thomas, Henry and John.

When Joan became old enough to marry and take full control of her inheritance, in 1284, Blanche and Edmund had to give up the counties. They were compensated by Blanche's dower, a hefty sum of money and the right to use the palace of the Navarrese kings in Paris. The following year, Philip III died and was succeeded by Blanche's son-in-law, Philip IV.

When hostilities broke out between England and France in 1293, Edmund and Blanche left Paris and moved to England. They returned to France in 1296 but resided in King Edward's continental possessions, where Edmund served as lieutenant of Gascony. Blanche was widowed again in June the same year when Edmund died during the siege of Bordeaux. She returned to her brother-in-law's court in November but did not stay in England for long. She received her dower, consisting of one third of all of Edmund's lands and all his rights in the earldom of Ferrers, and in 1298 she was back in France. She founded a Franciscan abbey in Nogent-l'Artaud in 1299, dedicated to Saint Louis IX of France, and declared her wish to be buried there rather than with her second husband in London or with her first husband in Provins. Queen Blanche's body is buried at the Cordeliers Convent in Paris, where her daughter was later buried beside her.

== Family tree ==
Louis VIII of France
Louis IX of France	Robert I of Artois
Philip III of France	Henry I of Navarre	Blanche of Artois	Edmund Crouchback
Philip IV of France	Joan I of Navarre	Thomas of Lancaster	Henry of Lancaster

== Sources ==
- Craig, Taylor (2006). Debating the Hundred Years War. Vol. 29: Pour Ce Que Plusieurs (La Loy Salicque) And a Declaration of the Trew and Dewe Title of Henry VIII. Cambridge University Press.
- Evergates, Theodore (2011). The Aristocracy in the County of Champagne, 1100–1300. University of Pennsylvania Press. ISBN 978-0-8122-0188-8.
- Gee, Loveday Lewes (2002). Women, art, and patronage from Henry III to Edward III, 1216-1377. The Boydell Press.
- George, Hereford Brooke (1875). Genealogical tables illustrative of modern history. Oxford at the Clarendon Press.
- Marshall, John (2026). Edmund, 1st Earl of Lancaster. Barsnley: Pen and Sword Books. ISBN 978-1-03614-368-8.
- Prestwich, Michael (1988). Edward I. University of California Press. ISBN 0-520-06266-3.
- Richardson, Douglas (2011). Plantagenet Ancestry: A Study In Colonial And Medieval Families. Douglas Richardson. ISBN 978-1-4610-4513-7.
- Woodacre, Elena (2013). The Queens Regnant of Navarre: Succession, Politics, and Partnership, 1274–1512. Palgrave Macmillan. ISBN 978-1-137-33915-7.

Royal titles
Preceded by Isabella of France	Queen consort of Navarre; Countess consort of Champagne; 1270–1274	Succeeded by Margaret of Burgundy
