= Theobald of Navarre =

Theobald, Teobaldo or Thibaut of Navarre may refer to:

- Theobald I of Navarre, reigned 1234–1253
- Theobald II of Navarre, reigned 1253–1270
