= John, Lord of Beaufort =

13th-century English prince

Lord of Beaufort
- Predecessor: Blanche of Artois
- Successor: Thomas of Lancaster
- Born: Before May 1286; London, England
- Died: Before 13 June 1317; France
- Spouse: Alix de Joinville
- House: Plantagenet (by birth); Lancaster
- Father: Edmund Crouchback
- Mother: Blanche of Artois

John, Lord of Beaufort was descended from one branch of the English royal dynasty of the Plantagenets. Born before May 1286, he was the third and youngest son of Edmund Crouchback, 1st Earl of Lancaster and Leicester, and Blanche of Artois. His father was the second son of King Henry III of England, making John the nephew of King Edward I of England and the cousin of King Edward II of England. His mother Blanche was the daughter of Count Robert I of Artois, son of King Louis VIII of France and brother of King Louis IX. Due to his mother's first marriage to King Henry I of Navarre, John was thus the half-brother of Queen Joan I of Navarre and the uncle of King Louis X of France, King Philip V of France, and King Charles IV of France and Navarre.

John inherited nothing from his father Edmund upon his death in 1296, while his elder brother Thomas, 2nd Earl of Lancaster (c. 1278–1322) inherited his father's estate. However, upon the death of their mother Blanche of Artois in 1302, most of her French possessions passed to John, including the lordship of Beaufort in Champagne – which had been sold to him by Hugh IV of Rethel in 1270 – and Nogent-l'Artaud, then in the Île-de-France region. Before July 1312, John of Beaufort married Alix de Joinville, widow of Jean d'Arcis and Chacenay and daughter of the seneschal Jean de Joinville, a famous companion in arms of King Louis IX of France. Their union produced no descendants and, when John died shortly before 13 June 1317, his other brother Henry, 3rd Earl of Lancaster inherited all his possessions in France.

His title Lord of Beaufort would eventually pass to John's grand niece Blanche of Lancaster whose husband John of Gaunt used the title and passed the name to his illegitimate children by Katherine Swynford who founded the House of Beaufort in England.

== Bibliography ==
- Lalore, Charles (1875). Collection des principaux cartulaires du diocèse de Troyes Tome IV. Paris: E Thorin.
- Marshall, John (2026). Edmund, 1st Earl of Lancaster. Barsnley: Pen and Sword Books. ISBN 978-1-03614-368-8.
- Waugh, Scott L. "Henry of Lancaster, third earl of Lancaster and third earl of Leicester (c. 1280–1345". Oxford Dictionary of National Biography (online ed.). Oxford: Oxford University Press. (Subscription, Wikipedia Library access or UK public library membership required.)
