= Bourbon family tree =

Ancestry of the House of Bourbon

This is a simplified family tree of the House of Bourbon (in Spanish, Borbón; in Italian, Borbone; in English, Borbon. The House of Bourbon is a cadet branch of the Capetian dynasty that descended from a younger son of King Louis IX of France. Louis IX's grandson was the first duke of Bourbon, whose descendants would later become Kings of France in accordance to the Salic law. In the present day, family representatives are the King of Spain and the Grand Duke of Luxembourg. Several others are pretenders to the thrones of France, Two Sicilies, and Brazil.

== Bourbon family tree ==
=== From Louis IX to Charles X ===
Direct Capetians
Louis IX; King of France; 1214–1270 r. 1226–1270	Margaret of Provence; 1221–1295
House of Bourbon
Philip III; King of France; 1245–1285 r. 1270–1285	Robert; Count of Clermont; 1256–1317 r. 1268–1317	Beatrice of Burgundy; 1257–1310
House of Valois
Charles; Count of Valois; 1270–1325 r. 1284–1325	Louis I Duke of Bourbon; 1279–1341 r. 1327–1341	Mary of Avesnes; 1280–1354
Philip VI; King of France; 1293–1350 r. 1328–1350
John II; King of France; 1319–1364 r. 1350–1364	Isabella of Valois; 1313–1383	Peter I Duke of Bourbon; 1311–1356 r. 1342–1356	James I Count of La Marche; 1319–1362 r. 1356–1362	Jeanne of Châtillon; 1320-1371
Charles V King of France; 1338–1380 r. 1364–1380	Joanna of Bourbon; 1338–1378	Louis II; Duke of Bourbon; 1337–1410 r. 1356–1410	Peter II; Count of La Marche; 1342–1362 r. 1362	John I Count of La Marche; 1344–1393 r. 1362–1393	Catherine of Vendôme; 1354–1412
Charles VI; King of France; 1368–1422 r. 1380–1422	John I Duke of Bourbon; 1381–1434 r. 1410–1434	Louis I Duke of Orléans; 1372–1407 r. 1392–1407	James II; Count of La Marche; 1370–1438 r. 1393–1438	Louis; Count of Vendôme; 1376–1446 r. 1393–1446	John; Lord of Carency; 1378–1458 r. 1393–1458
Charles VII; King of France; 1403–1461 r. 1422–1461	Charles I Duke of Bourbon; 1401–1456 r. 1434–1456	Louis I Count of Montpensier; 1405–1486 r. 1428–1486	John; Count of Angoulême; 1399–1467	Eleanor of Bourbon-La Marche; 1407–aft.1464	Lords of Carency
Louis XI; King of France; 1423–1483 r. 1461–1483	Joan of France; 1435–1482	John II; Duke of Bourbon; 1426–1488 r. 1456–1488	Charles II; Duke of Bourbon; 1433–1488 r. 1488	Louis; Bishop of Liège; 1438–1482 r. 1456–1482	Gilbert; Count of Montpensier; 1443–1496 r. 1486–1496	Charles; Count of Angoulême; 1459–1496 r. 1467–1496	Dukes of Nemours	John VIII; Count of Vendôme; 1425–1477 r. 1446–1477
Anne of France; 1461–1522	Peter II; Count of La Marche; Duke of Bourbon; 1438–1503 r. 1488–1503	Peter of Bourbon-Busset; 1464–1529	Francis; Count of Vendôme; 1470–1495 r. 1477–1495	Louis; Prince of La Roche-sur-Yon; 1473–1520	Louise; Duchess of Montpensier; 1482–1561 r. 1538–1561
Suzanne; Duchess of Bourbon; 1491–1521 r. 1503–1521	Charles III; Count of La Marche; Duke of Bourbon; 1490–1527 r. 1521–1527	Philip of Bourbon-Busset; 1494–1557	Francis I King of France; 1494–1547 r. 1515–1547	Charles; Duke of Vendôme; 1489–1537 r. 1514–1537	Louis; Duke of Montpensier; 1513-1582 r. 1561–1582
Bourbon-Busset illegitimate male-line	Henry II; King of France; 1519–1559 r. 1547–1559	Jeanne III d'Albret; Queen of Navarre; 1528–1572 r. 1555–1572	Antoine; Duke of Vendôme; King of Navarre; 1518–1562 r. 1555–1562	Louis; Prince of Condé; 1530–1569 r. 1546–1569	Dukes of Montpensier
Margaret of France; 1553–1615	Henry IV of Bourbon; King of France; 1553–1610 r. 1589–1610	Marie de' Medici; 1575–1642	Henri I Prince of Condé; 1552–1588 r. 1569–1588
Louis XIII; King of France; 1601–1643 r. 1610–1643	Henri II; Prince of Condé; 1588–1646 r. 1588–1646
Louis XIV; King of France; 1638–1715 r. 1643–1715	Louis II; Grand Condé; Prince of Condé; 1621–1686 r. 1646–1686	Armand; Prince of Conti; 1629–1666 r. 1629–1666	Philippe I 1640–1701; Duke of Orléans
Henri Jules; Prince of Condé; 1643–1709 r. 1686–1709
Louis; 1661-1711 "Grand Dauphin" of France	{{{La2}}}	Louise Bénédicte de Bourbon; 1676-1753	Louis III; Prince of Condé; 1668–1710 r. 1709–1710	Louise Françoise of Bourbon; 1673–1743	Marie Thérèse de Bourbon; 1666–1732	François Louis; Grand Conti; Prince of Conti; 1664–1709 r. 1685–1709	Louis Armand I Prince of Conti; 1661–1685 r. 1666–1685	Marie Anne de Bourbon; 1666–1739
Louis; 1682–1712; Duke of Burgundy, Dauphin of France	Philip V 1683–1746; King of Naples, Sardinia, and Spain	Louis IV Henri; Prince de Condé; 1692–1740 r. 1710–1740	Marie Anne de Bourbon; 1689–1720	Louise Élisabeth de Bourbon; 1693–1775	Louis Armand II; Prince of Conti; 1695–1727 r. 1709–1727
Louis XV; King of France; 1710-1774 r. 1715–1774	Louis V Joseph; Prince of Condé; 1736–1818 r. 1740–1818	Louis François; Prince of Conti; 1717–1776 r. 1727–1776
Louis; 1729–1765; Dauphin of France	Maria Teresa of Spain; 1726–1746	Louis VI Henri; Prince of Condé; 1756–1830 r. 1818–1830	Louis François Joseph; Prince of Conti; 1734–1814 r. 1776–1814
Louis XVI; King of France; 1754–1793 r. 1774–1792	Louis XVIII; King of France; 1755–1824 r. 1815–1824	Charles X King of France; 1757–1836 r. 1824–1830	Louis Antoine; Duke of Enghien; 1772–1804

=== Descent from Henry IV ===
see also:Family tree of Spanish monarchs

Henry IV; King of France (1589–1610)
Louis XIII; King of France (1610–1643)
Louis XIV; King of France (1643–1715)	Philippe I Duke of Orléans
Louis "Le Grand Dauphin" of France	Philippe II; Duke of Orléans; Regent of France
Louis "Le Petit Dauphin" of France	Philip V King of Spain (1700–1746)	Louis; Duke of Orléans
Louis XV; King of France (1715–1774)	Louis I King of Spain (1724)	Ferdinand VI; King of Spain (1746–1759)	Charles III; King of Spain (1759–1788)	Philip; Duke of Parma (1748–1765)	Louis Philippe I Duke of Orléans
Louis; Dauphin of France	Charles IV; King of Spain (1788–1808)	Ferdinand; Duke of Parma (1765–1802)	Louis Philippe II (Philippe Égalité); Duke of Orléans
Louis XVI; King of France (1774–1791); King of the French (1791–1792); Titular King of France (1792–1793)	Louis XVIII; Titular King of France (1795–1804); Legitimist pretender (1804–1814); King of France (1814–1824)	Charles X King of France (1824–1830); Legitimist pretender (1830–1836)	Ferdinand VII; King of Spain (1808; 1813–1833)	Francisco de Paula	Carlos; Count of Molina Carlos V Carlist pretender (1833–1845)	Louis I King of Etruria (1801–1803)	Louis Philippe I King of the French (1830–1848); Orléanist pretender (1848–1850)
Louis; Dauphin of France as Louis XVII; Titular King of France (1793–1795)	Louis-Antoine; Duke of Angoulême Dauphin of France as Louis XIX; Legitimist pretender (1836–1844)	Charles Ferdinand; Duke of Berry	Isabella II; Queen of Spain (1833–1868)	Francis; Duke of Cádiz; King consort of Spain	Carlos; Count of Montemolin Carlos VI; Carlist pretender (1845–1861)	Juan; Count of Montizón Juan III; Carlist pretender (1861–1868) as Jean III; Legitimist pretender (1883–1887)	Louis II; King of Etruria (1803–1807) Charles I Duke of Lucca (1824–1847) Charles II; Duke of Parma (1847–1849)	Ferdinand Philippe; Duke of Orléans
Henri; Count of Chambord as Henri V Legitimist pretender (1844–1883)	Alfonso XII; King of Spain (1874–1885)	Carlos; Duke of Madrid Carlos VII; Carlist pretender (1868–1909) as Charles XI; Legitimist pretender (1887–1909)	Alfonso Carlos; Duke of San Jaime Alfonso Carlos I Carlist pretender (1931–1936) as Charles XII; Legitimist pretender (1931–1936)	Charles III; Duke of Parma (1849–1854)	Philippe; Count of Paris as Philippe VII; Orléanist pretender (1850–1894)	Robert; Duke of Chartres
Alfonso XIII; King of Spain (1886–1931) as Alphonse I Legitimist pretender (1936–1941)	Jaime; Duke of Madrid Jaime III; Carlist pretender (1909–1931) as Jacques I Legitimist pretender (1909–1931)	Robert I Duke of Parma (1854–1859)	Philippe; Duke of Orléans as Philippe VIII; Orléanist pretender (1894–1926)	Jean; Duke of Guise as Jean III; Orléanist pretender (1926–1940)
Jaime; Duke of Segovia Jaime IV; Carlist pretender (1941–1969) as Jacques II or Henri VI; Legitimist pretender (1941–1975)	Juan; Count of Barcelona	Xavier; Duke of Parma; Carlist regent (1936–1952) Javier I Carlist pretender (1952–1977)	Felix; Prince of Luxembourg	Henri; Count of Paris as Henri VI; Orléanist pretender (1940–1999)
Alfonso; Duke of Anjou and Cádiz as Alphonse II; Legitimist pretender (1975–1989)	Juan Carlos I King of Spain (1975–2014)	Carlos Hugo; Duke of Parma Carlos Hugo I Carlist pretender (1977–1979)	Sixtus Henry; Prince of Parma Enrique V Carlist pretender (1979–present)	Jean; Grand Duke of Luxembourg (1964–2000)	Henri; Count of Paris; Duke of France as Henri VII; Orléanist pretender (1999–2019)
Louis; Duke of Anjou as Louis XX; Legitimist pretender (1989–present)	Felipe VI; King of Spain (2014–present)	Carlos; Duke of Parma Carlos Xavier II; Carlist pretender (2011–present)	Henri; Grand Duke of Luxembourg (2000–2025)	Jean; Count of Paris as Jean IV; Orléanist pretender (2019–present)
Louis; Duke of Burgundy; Dauphin of France	Leonor; Princess of Asturias	Carlos; Prince of Piacenza	Guillaume V Grand Duke of Luxembourg (2025–present)	Gaston; Count of Clermont

== See also ==
- House of Bourbon
- List of Spanish monarchs - List of French monarchs
- Duke of Bourbon - Duke of Parma - Prince of Condé - Prince of Conti - Duke of Anjou
- Henry IV of France's succession
- File:Habsburg-bourbon-parma-2siciliesX.png: A chart of the dynastic links among the royal houses of Habsburg, Bourbon, Bourbon-Parma and Bourbon-Two Sicilies
