= Margaret of Burgundy, Queen of Sicily =

Margaret of Burgundy
- Queen of Sicily; Queen of Naples; Queen of Albania titular Queen of Jerusalem; Countess of Tonnerre
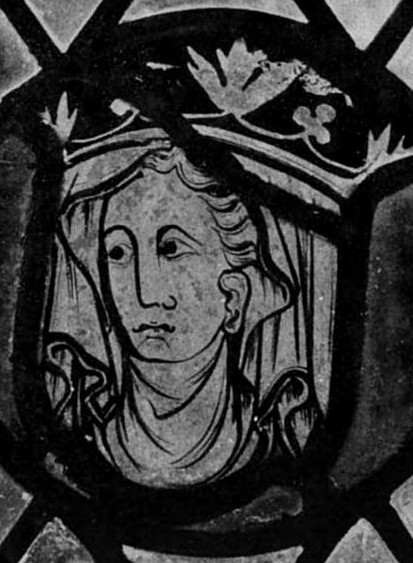

Queen consort of Naples
- Tenure: 1282 – 1285

Queen consort of Sicily
- Tenure: 18 November 1268 – 1282

Countess of Tonnerre
- Tenure: 1262 – 4 September 1308

Queen consort of Albania
- Tenure: February 1272 – 7 January 1285
- Successor: Maria of Hungary
- Born: 1250
- Died: 4 September 1308 (aged 57–58)
- Spouse: Charles I of Anjou
- Issue: Margaret
- House: Burgundy
- Father: Odo, Count of Nevers
- Mother: Matilda II, Countess of Nevers

Margaret of Burgundy (French: Marguerite de Bourgogne; 1250 – 4 September 1308), also known as Margaret of Jerusalem (Marguerite de Jérusalem), was Queen of Sicily and Naples and titular Queen of Jerusalem by marriage to Charles I of Sicily. She was also Queen of Albania (1272-1285) as well as ruling Countess of Tonnerre (1262–1308).

== Life ==
The second daughter of Odo, Count of Nevers, and Maud of Dampierre, Margaret was Countess of Tonnerre by inheritance from 1262 until her death.

She became Queen consort of Sicily by her marriage to Charles of Anjou, King of Sicily and Count of Anjou and Provence, on 18 November 1268. In February 1272 she became Queen consort of Albania when a delegation of Albanian nobles and citizens from Durrës reached Charles's court, where he signed a treaty declaring himself the King of Albania. Their only daughter, Margaret, died in infancy. She also became titular Queen consort of Jerusalem, after Charles bought the title from Mary of Antioch in 1277. She and her husband lost the title of King and Queen of Sicily in 1282, becoming King and Queen of Naples only.

After Charles died in 1285, Margaret retired to her lands in Tonnerre, residing in the castle there with Margaret of Brienne (widow of Bohemund VII of Tripoli) and Catherine I of Courtenay, titular Empress of Constantinople (a granddaughter of Charles of Anjou by his first wife). She sold the lordship of Torigny, Normandy, to Pierre the Fat, chamberlain of King Philip IV of France, for 9500 livres tournois (about 768 kg or 1,700 lb of fine silver). At Tonnerre, the three women lived lives of charity and prayer and Margaret founded the Hospice of the Fontenilles (l’Hospice des Fontenilles), providing adequate funds for its maintenance.

She died in 1308 and she left her possessions to her great-nephew, John II of Châlon-Auxerre. She was buried in the Hospice.

Preceded by Beatrice of Provence	Queen consort of Sicily; 1268–1282	Succeeded by Isabella of Castile
Preceded by New title	Queen consort of Naples; 1282–1285	Succeeded by Maria Arpad of Hungary
Preceded by Anna Komnene Doukaina	Princess consort of Achaea; 1278–1285	Succeeded by Maria Arpad of Hungary
