= John of Burgundy (1231–1268) =

12th-century Count of Charolais and Lord of Bourbon

- Count of Charolais
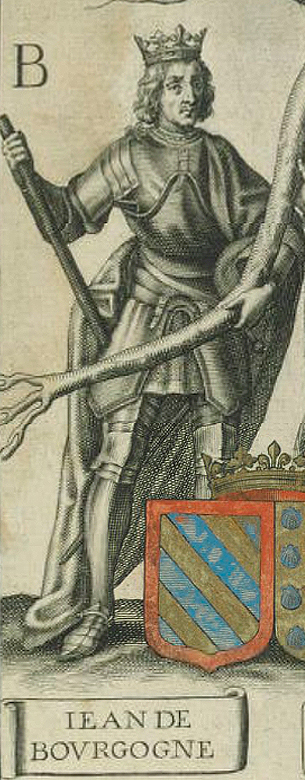
- Born: 1231
- Died: 29 September 1268
- Noble family: House of Burgundy
- Spouse: Agnes of Dampierre
- Issue: Beatrice
- Father: Hugh IV, Duke of Burgundy
- Mother: Yolande of Dreux

John of Burgundy (Jean de Bourgogne; 1231 – 29 September 1268) was a Count of Charolais and Lord of Bourbon. He was the younger son of Duke Hugh IV of Burgundy and Yolande of Dreux.

John married in February 1248 to Agnes (d. 1288), the heiress of Lord Archambaud IX of Bourbon from the House of Dampierre. After the death of his father-in law in 1249, John became Lord of Bourbon in right of his wife (jure uxoris).

John and Agnes had a daughter, Beatrice (d. 1310), who inherited possessions from both of her parents. In 1272, she married the royal Prince Robert, Count of Clermont, and thereby founded the Capetian dynasty of the Bourbons.
