= John of Charolais =

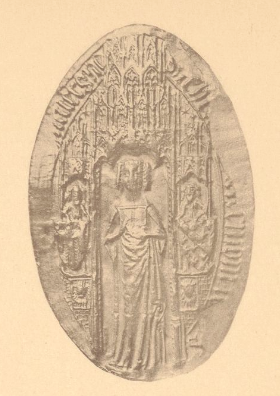
The seal of the daughter of John, Lady Joanna.

John (French: Jean; 1283 — 1322) was a medieval French nobleman, Lord (seigneur) of Charolais and Saint-Just, who fought in Flanders. He is also known as John of Clermont (Jean de Clermont).

== Life ==
Lord John was born in 1283 as a son of Robert, Count of Clermont and his wife, Beatrice of Burgundy, Lady of Bourbon. In 1309c., John married Joanna of Dargies and Catheux (daughter of Renaud II of Dargies and Catheux and his spouse, Agnes).

John and his wife had;

- Beatrice of Charolais, who succeeded her father. Married, as his second wife, John I, Count of Armagnac
- Joanna, wife to John I, Count of Auvergne

== Burial ==
John was buried in Lyon, but his bones were later transferred to Paris.

== Sources ==
- Laiou, Angeliki E. (1972). Constantinople and the Latins: the foreign policy of Andronicus II, 1282-1328. Harvard University Press.
