= Sire de Bourbon =

Title of the rulers of the Bourbonnais from 913 to 1327 in France

The Sire de Bourbon or Seigneur de Bourbon, meaning Lord of Bourbon, was the title by which the rulers of the Bourbonnais were known, from 913 to 1327, and from which the cognomen of the royal House of the same name derives. Louis I, count of Clermont, the ultimate holder, was created the first "Duke of Bourbon" and made "count of La Marche" by his cousin, King Charles IV of France, in exchange for Clermont-en-Beauvaisis, thus absorbing the title.

This title dates to at least the early 10th century and Aymar[fr] de Bourbon. Aymar lived under the reign of the Carolingian overlord Charles III of France who gave to him, in the year 913, several strongholds on the river Allier, such as the castle in the medieval town of Bourbon-l'Archambault. Of Aymar's ten successors all but three took the name "Archambault". His line ended in 1200 with the death of Archambaud VII, whose granddaughter, Mathilde of Bourbon, then became the first dame de Bourbon (dame being the feminine form of seigneur/sire), as she was Archambaud's eldest living relative (the title being heritable by female family members). Mathilde's husband, Guy II of Dampierre, added Montluçon to the possessions of the Lords of Bourbon, which had expanded to the river Cher during the 11th and 12th centuries. Their son, Archambaud VIII "the Great", seigneur de Bourbon from the year 1216 to the year 1242, rose to connétable de ("the constable of ...") France, the commander-in-chief of the French military.

Following the death of Archambaud IX in 1249 on crusade, the title then passed through his daughters; first, Matilda II (also known as "Mahaut"), Countess of Nevers, Auxerre and Tonnerre, and second, Agnes of Bourbon, whose husband, John of Burgundy, was the second son of the Duke of Burgundy, Hugh IV, and therefore a male-line descendant of Hugh Capet. John, himself seigneur de Charolais became lord of Bourbon as well upon the death of Matilda in 1262. He died five years later at the age of thirty-six and Agnes remained a widow. John's daughter by Agnes, Beatrice, after the death of her mother in 1287, became his heir both in Charolais and Bourbonnais.

Beatrice's spouse, Robert of France, was the sixth son of saint Louis IX, King of France, and the founder of the House of Bourbon which was to reach the throne of France in the person of its 10th-degree descendant, King Henry IV of France. The son of Robert and Beatrice, Louis, became the first Duke of Bourbon, superseding the previous rank of seigneur.
