= Odo of Nevers =

French noble (1230–1266)

Odo, Count of Nevers
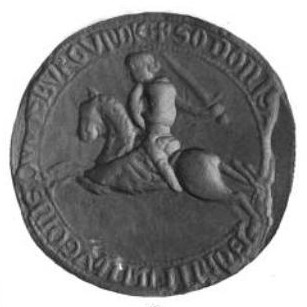
- Seal of Odo of Nevers
- Born: 1230
- Died: 1266 (aged 35–36); Acre
- Noble family: House of Burgundy
- Spouse: Maud of Dampierre
- Issue: Yolande II, Countess of Nevers; Margaret, Countess of Tonnerre; Adelaide, Countess of Auxerre
- Father: Hugh IV, Duke of Burgundy
- Mother: Yolande of Dreux

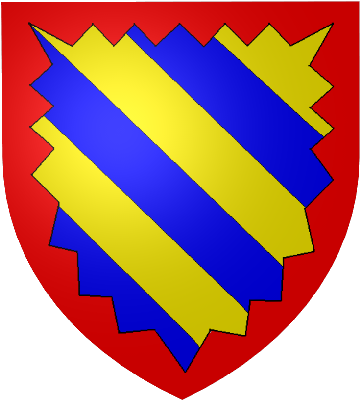
Coats of Arms of Eudes of Burgundy, Count of Nevers and Auxerre

Odo of Burgundy, in French Eudes de Bourgogne or Eudes de Nevers (1230 – 4 August 1266), was the Count of Nevers, Auxerre and Tonnerre and son of Hugh IV, Duke of Burgundy and Yolande of Dreux.

In 1265, Odo became one of the last European barons to lead a crusading force to the Holy Land. Among his fifty knights was Erard of Valery. He defended Acre when Sultan Baybars I harassed it on 1 June 1266 in advance of his besieging Safad. He died at Acre on 7 August 1266 and was buried in the church of Saint Nicholas. He left all his wealth to pay his followers and to endow hospitals and religious institutions. He was described by the Templar of Tyre as a "holy man", and his tomb attracted veneration. Within a year of his death, the poet Rutebeuf wrote a Complainte du comte Eudes de Nevers, a lament for a valiant knight and also for the city that lost its defender.

Burgundy passed to Odo's brother, Robert.

== Marriage and children ==
Odo married Maud of Dampierre and they had:

- Yolande, Countess of Nevers (1247–1280), married (1) John Tristan, Count of Valois, and (2) Count Robert III of Flanders
- Margaret, Countess of Tonnerre (1250–1308), married King Charles I of Naples
- Adelaide, Countess of Auxerre (1251–1290), married John I of Chalon, Lord of Rochefort
- Jeanne (1253–1271), died young

== Sources ==
- Bubenicek, Michelle (2002). Quand les femmes gouvernent: droit et politique au XIVe siècle:Yolande de Flandre, Droit et politique au XIV siecle. Ecole des Chartes.
- Folda, Jaroslav (2005). Crusader art in the Holy Land : from the Third Crusade to the fall of Acre, 1187-1291. Cambridge University Press.
- Jamison, Evelyn Mary; Clementi, Dione (1992). Studies on the History of Medieval Sicily and South Italy. Scientia Verlag.
- Paviot, Jacques (2006). "Odo of Burgundy (d. 1266)". In Murray, Alan V. (ed.). The Crusades: An Encyclopedia. Vol. 2. ABC-CLIO.

== See also ==
- Dukes of Burgundy family tree
