= Mathilde of Bourbon =

French noblewoman (c. 1165/69–c. 1218)

- Born: c. 1165/69
- Died: c. 1218
- Noble family: Bourbon
- Spouses: Gaucher IV of Vienne; Guy II of Dampierre
- Issue Detail: Archambaud VIII; William II
- Father: Archambaud VII of Bourbon
- Mother: Alix of Burgundy, daughter of Odo II

Mathilde of Bourbon (French: Mahaut de Bourbon; c. 1165/69 – c. 1218) was a French noblewoman who was the ruling Lady of Bourbon from 1171 until her death in 1218.

== Life ==
Mathilde was the only child of Archambault of Bourbon and his wife Alix (or Adelaide) of Burgundy (daughter of Odo II). She was born in the second half of the 1160s.

Her father, the heir apparent of Bourbon, died in 1169, without ever inheriting the lordship. Her grandfather, Archambault VII, died in 1171. Mathilde, as his only surviving grandchild, succeeded him.

Before 1183, she married Gaucher IV of Vienne, Lord of Salins. After he returned from the Third Crusade, they frequently quarreled. In the end, he became violent and had her locked up. She fled to her grandmother's estate in Champagne. During her escape, she allegedly also used violence, and for this she was excommunicated by Archbishop Henri de Sully of Bourges. After she arrived in Champagne, she asked Pope Celestine III for a divorce from her husband, arguing that Gaucher IV and she were close relatives and that the marriage therefore had been inadmissible. The Pope tasked the bishops of Autun and Troyes and the abbot of Monthiers-en-Argonne with investigating her claim. These men found that Mathilde and her husband were third cousins, as they were both great-great-grandchildren of William II, Count of Burgundy, and that, therefore, her claim that they were too closely related was justified. The pope granted the divorce, and also lifted the excommunication.

In September 1196, only a few months after her divorce, she married Lord Guy II of Dampierre. Thus, the Bourbonnais fell to the House of Dampierre. This marriage lasted 20 years: he died in 1216.

Mathilde died twelve years after her husband. After her death, Margaret, her daughter from her first marriage claimed the Lordship of Bourbon. Guy II had initially recognized Margaret as heir of Bourbon, however, he later claimed the Lordship for his oldest son, Archambault VIII. In the end, Archambault prevailed.

== Marriages and issue ==
Mathilde married Gaucher IV of Vienne, Lord of Salins. Together, they had one daughter:

- Margaret of Vienne (c. 1190/95 – c. 1259), married William III of Forcalquier, later she married Joceran, Lord of Brancion

Mathilde's second husband was Guy II of Dampierre. With him, she had:

- Archambaud VIII (1189–1242), Lord of Bourbon
- William II (1196–1231), married Margaret II, Countess of Flanders and Hainaut (d. 1280), a daughter of Latin Emperor Baldwin I of Constantinople
- Philippa (d. 1223), married in 1205 to Guigues IV, Count of Forez (d. 1241)
- Guy of Saint Just (d. 22 March 1275)
- Marie, married 1201 to Hervé of Vierzon, later married 1220 to Henry I of Sully
- Matilde, married Guigues V of Forez

== Sources ==
- Bourbon (2002). "House of Bourbon". Lexikon des Mittelalters. Vol. 2. Deutscher Taschenbuch Verlag. ISBN 3-423-59057-2.
- Devailly, Guy (1973). Le Berry du X siecle au milieu du XIII (in French). Mouton & Co.
- Evergates, Theodore (2007). The Aristocracy in the County of Champagne, 1100-1300. University of Pennsylvania Press.
- Pfaff, Volkert (1977). "Das kirchliche Eherecht am Ende des zwölften Jahrhunderts". Zeitschrift der Savigny-Stiftung für Rechtsgeschichte: Kanonistische Abteilung (in German). Vol. 63. Böhlau.
