= Margaret of Provence =

Queen of France from 1234 to 1270

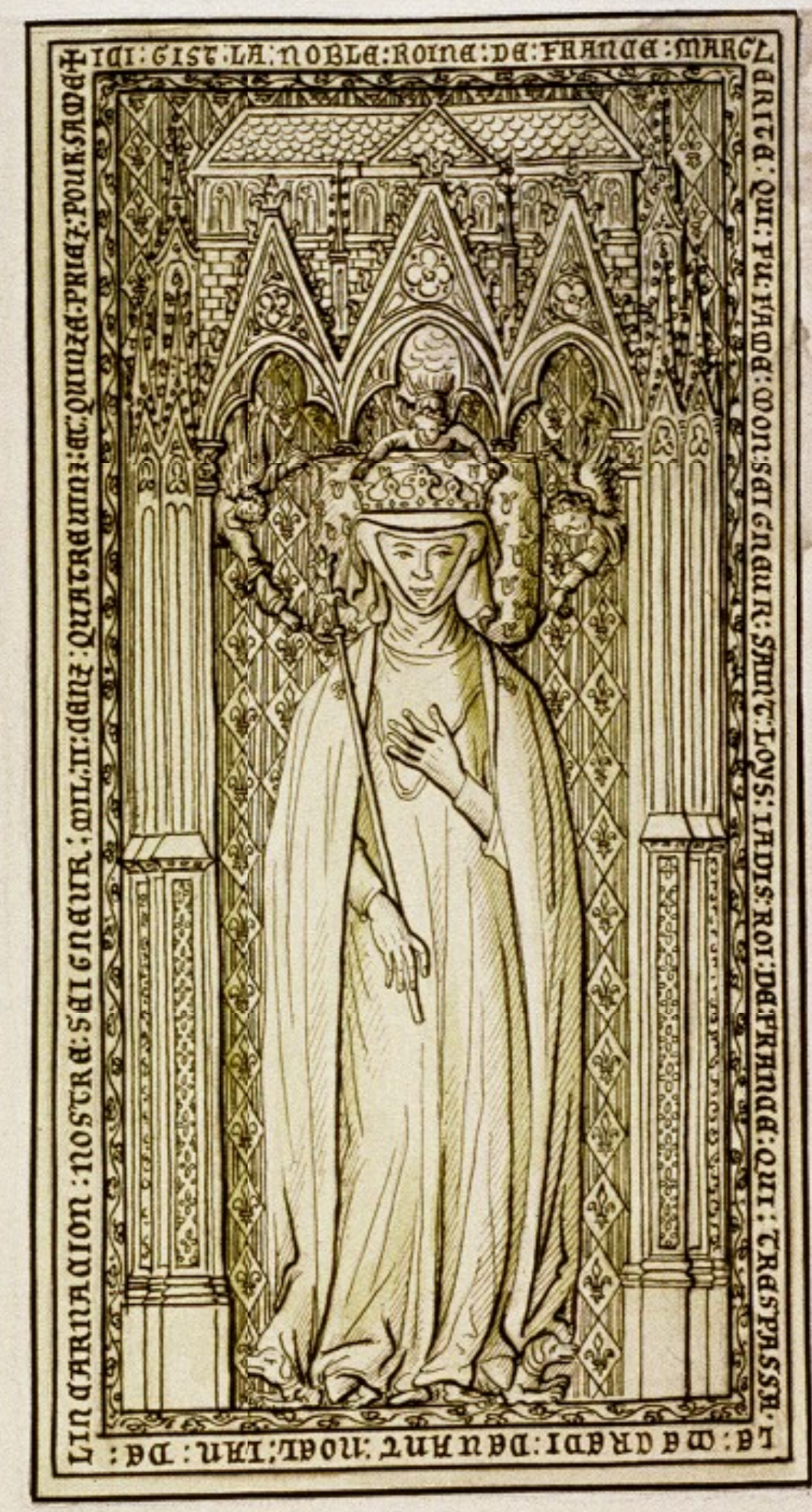
- Illustration of the tomb of Queen Margaret, formerly in the Abbey of St. Denis

Queen consort of France
- Tenure: 27 May 1234 – 25 August 1270
- Coronation: 28 May 1234
- Born: Spring 1221; Forcalquier, Alpes-de-Haute-Provence
- Died: 20 December 1295 (aged 74); Paris, France
- Burial: Saint Denis Basilica
- Spouse: Louis IX of France (m. 1234; died 1270)
- Issue among others...: Isabella, Queen of Navarre; Louis of France; Philip III, King of France; John Tristan, Count of Valois; Peter, Count of Perche; Blanche, Infanta of Castile; Margaret, Duchess of Brabant; Robert, Count of Clermont; Agnes, Duchess of Burgundy
- House: Barcelona
- Father: Ramon Berenguer IV, Count of Provence
- Mother: Beatrice of Savoy

Margaret of Provence (French: Marguerite; 1221 – 20 December 1295) was Queen of France by marriage to King Louis IX.

== Early life ==
Margaret was born in the spring of 1221 in Forcalquier. She was the eldest of four daughters of Ramon Berenguer IV, Count of Provence, and Beatrice of Savoy. Her younger sisters were Queen Eleanor of England, Queen Sanchia of Germany, and Queen Beatrice of Sicily. She was especially close to Eleanor, to whom she was close in age, and with whom she sustained a friendly relationship until they grew old.

== Queen ==
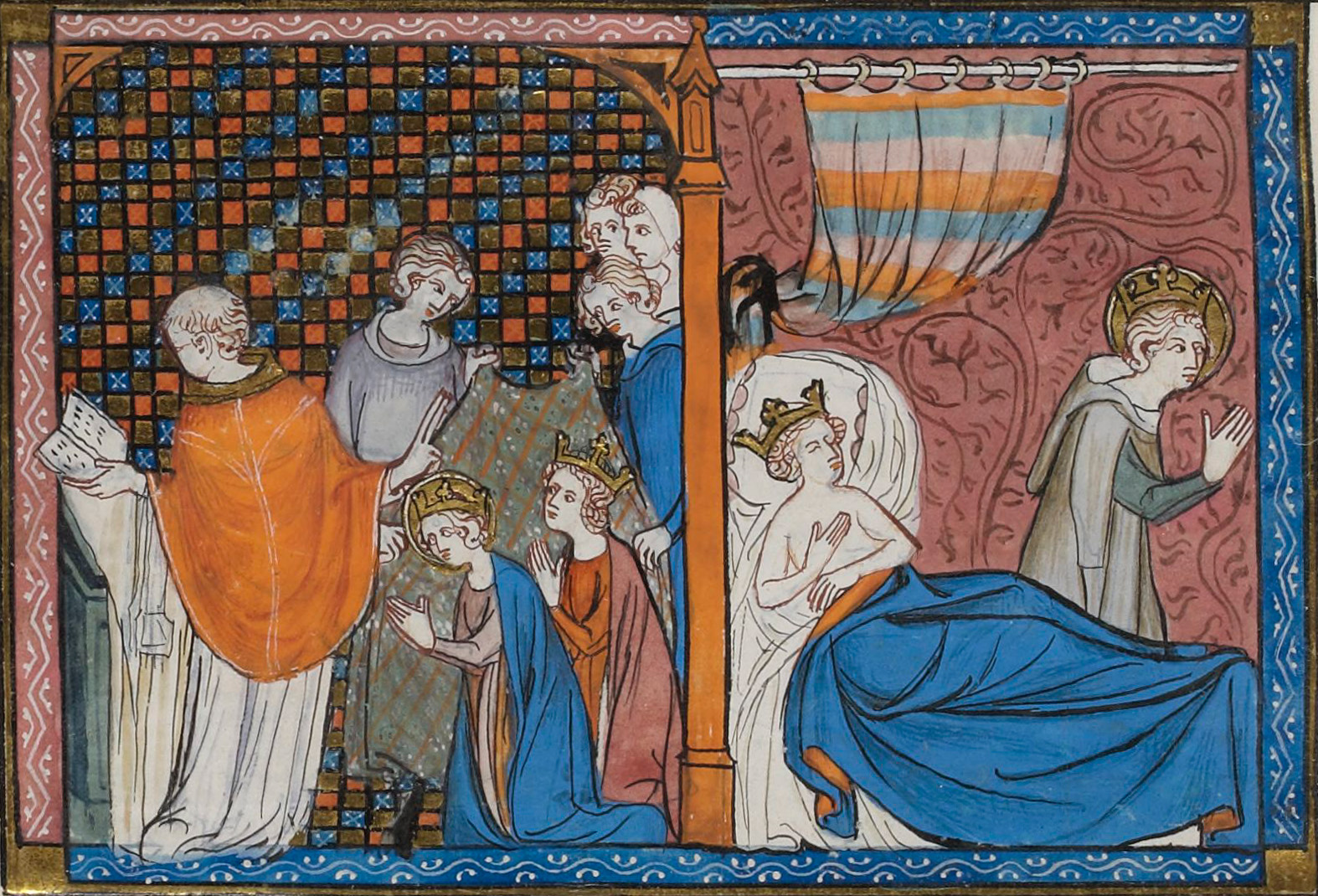
Marriage of Margaret and Louis

In 1233, Blanche of Castile, mother of King Louis IX of France, sent one of her knights to Provence, partly to offset the troublesome Count Raymond VII of Toulouse and partly to meet Margaret, whose grace and beauty were widely reported. Margaret and her father entertained the knight well, and soon Blanche was negotiating with the count of Provence about the marriage of a daughter of his and Blanche's son. Margaret was chosen as a good match for the king more for her religious devotion and courtly manner than her beauty. She was escorted to Lyon by her parents for the marriage treaty to be signed. From there, she was escorted to her wedding in Sens by her uncles William and Thomas of Savoy. On 27 May 1234, at the age of thirteen, Margaret married Louis. She was crowned queen of France the following day. Both the wedding and the coronation were celebrated at the cathedral of Sens.

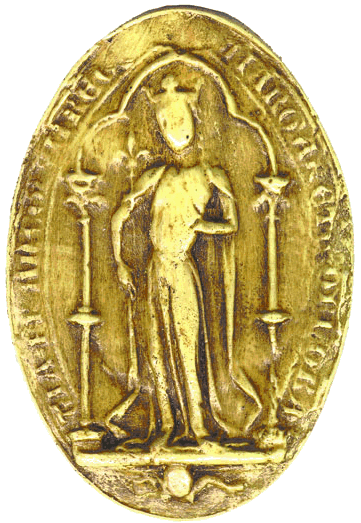
Margaret's seal as queen

The marriage was a difficult one in numerous aspects. Blanche still wielded strong influence over her son and would throughout her life. As a sign of her authority, Blanche dismissed Margaret's uncles and all of the servants she had brought with her from her childhood shortly after the wedding. Margaret and Blanche resented each other from the beginning.

Margaret, like her sisters, was noted for her beauty. She was said to be "pretty with dark hair and fine eyes", and in the early years of their marriage she and Louis enjoyed a warm relationship. Her Franciscan confessor, William de St. Pathus, related that on cold nights Margaret would place a robe around Louis' shoulders, when her deeply religious husband rose to pray. Another anecdote recorded by St. Pathus related that Margaret felt that Louis' plain clothing was unbecoming to his royal dignity, to which Louis replied that he would dress as she wished, if she dressed as he wished.

They enjoyed riding together, reading, and listening to music. The attentions of the king and court being drawn to the new queen only made Blanche more jealous, and she worked to keep the king and queen apart as much as possible.

=== During the Seventh Crusade ===
Margaret accompanied Louis on the Seventh Crusade (their first). Her sister Beatrice also joined. Though initially the crusade met with some success, such as the capture of the Egyptian city of Damietta in 1249, it became a disaster after the king's brother was killed and the king then captured by Egyptian forces in 1250.

Queen Margaret was responsible for negotiations and gathering enough silver for his ransom. She was thus for a brief time the only woman ever to lead a crusade. In 1250, while in Damietta, where she earlier in the same year successfully maintained order, she gave birth to John Tristan.

The chronicler Jean de Joinville, who was not a priest, reports incidents demonstrating Margaret's bravery after Louis was made prisoner in Egypt. For example, she decisively acted to assure a food supply for the Christians in Damietta and went so far as to ask the knight who guarded her bedchamber to kill her and her newborn son if the city should fall to the Arabs. She also convinced some of those who had been about to leave to remain in Damietta and defend it. Joinville also recounts incidents that demonstrate Margaret's good humor, as on one occasion when Joinville sent her some fine cloth and, when the queen saw his messenger arrive carrying them, she mistakenly knelt down thinking that he was bringing her holy relics. When she realized her mistake, she burst into laughter and ordered the messenger, "Tell your master evil days await him, for he has made me kneel to his camelines!"

However, Joinville also remarked with noticeable disapproval that Louis rarely asked after his wife and children. In a moment of extreme danger during a terrible storm on the sea voyage back to France from the Crusade, Margaret begged Joinville to do something to help; he told her to pray for deliverance and to vow that when they reached France she would go on a pilgrimage and offer a golden ship with images of the king, herself and her children in thanks for their escape from the storm. Margaret could only reply that she dared not make such a vow without the king's permission, because when he discovered that she had done so, he would never let her make the pilgrimage. In the end, Joinville promised her that if she made the vow he would make the pilgrimage for her, and when they reached France he did so.

=== Political significance ===
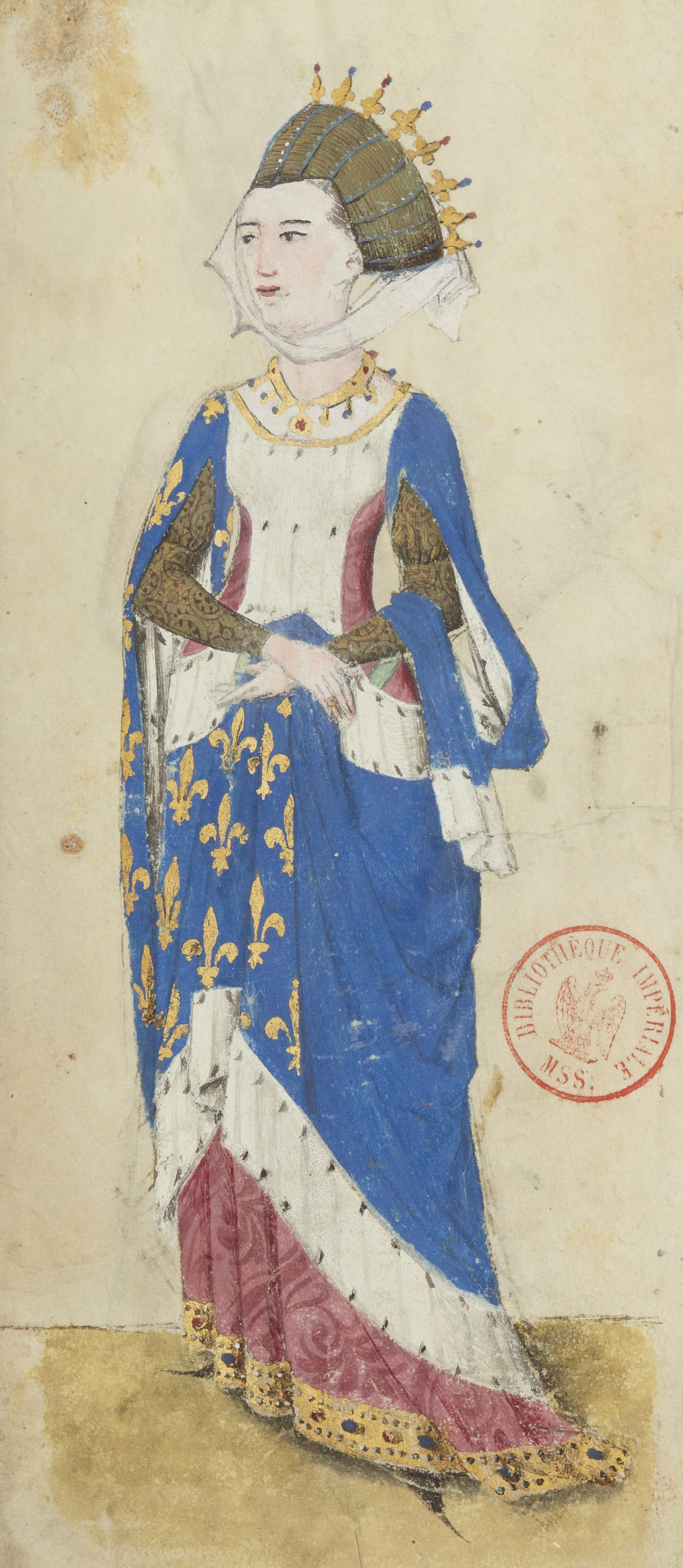
Posthumous depiction of Margaret in the 15th century Armorial d'Auvergne

Margaret and Louis IX remained in Palestine until 1254, then returned to their homeland. By this time, Blanche of Castile had already died (in 1252), and Margaret took her place as the king's adviser and assistant. Her leadership during the crusade had brought her international prestige and after she returned to France, Margaret was often asked to mediate disputes. She feared the ambitions of her brother-in-law Charles, though, and strengthened the bond with her sister Eleanor and Eleanor's husband, King Henry III of England, as a counterweight. In 1254, she and her husband invited them to spend Christmas in Paris.

Then, in 1259, the Treaty of Paris was concluded after the relationship between Louis and Henry had improved. Margaret was present during the negotiations along with all of her sisters and her mother.

In later years, Louis became vexed with Margaret's ambition. It seems that when it came to politics or diplomacy she was indeed ambitious, but somewhat inept. An English envoy at Paris in the 1250s reported to the English court, evidently in some disgust, that "the queen of France is tedious in word and deed," and it is clear from the envoy's report that he was not impressed with her efforts to create an opportunity for herself to engage in affairs of state. After the death of her eldest son Louis in 1260, Margaret induced the next son, Philip, to swear an oath that no matter at what age he succeeded to the throne, he would remain under her tutelage until the age of thirty. When Louis found out about the oath, he immediately asked the pope to excuse Philip from the vow on the grounds that he himself had not authorized it, and the pope immediately obliged. This ended Margaret's attempt to make herself a second Blanche of Castile. Margaret subsequently failed as well to influence her nephew King Edward I of England to avoid a marriage project for one of his daughters that would promote the interests in her native Provence of her brother-in-law, Charles of Anjou, who had married her youngest sister Beatrice.

== Queen dowager ==
After the death of Louis IX on his second crusade in 1270, during which she remained in France, she returned to Provence. She became a more politically active figure after his death. She was particularly exigent – to the point of raising troops – in defending her rights in Provence, where Charles maintained his political authority and control of property after Beatrice's death, contrary to the intentions of Margaret and Beatrice's father, who had died in 1245. She was devoted to Eleanor, and they stayed in contact until Eleanor's death in 1291. Her last years were spent doing pious work, including the founding of the Franciscan nunnery of Lourcines in 1289.

Margaret herself died in Paris, at the Poor Clares monastery she had founded, on 20 December 1295, at the age of seventy-four. She was buried near (but not beside) her husband in the Basilica of St-Denis outside Paris. Her grave, beneath the altar steps, was never marked by a monument, so its location is unknown; probably for this reason, it was the only royal grave in the basilica that was not ransacked during the French Revolution, and it probably remains intact today.

== Issue ==
King Louis IX of France and Margaret of Provence had eleven children together:

1. Blanche (1240 – 29 April 1243)
2. Isabella (2 March 1241 – 28 January 1271), married Theobald II of Navarre
3. Louis (25 February 1244 – January 1260)
4. Philip III of France (1 May 1245 – 5 October 1285), married firstly Isabella of Aragon, by whom he had issue, including Philip IV of France and Charles, Count of Valois; he married secondly Maria of Brabant, by whom he had issue, including Margaret of France.
5. John (born and died in 1248)
6. John Tristan (1250 – 3 August 1270), born in Egypt on his father's first Crusade and died in Tunisia on his second
7. Peter (1251–1284)
8. Blanche (1253–1323), married Ferdinand de la Cerda, Infante of Castile
9. Margaret (1254–1271), married John I, Duke of Brabant
10. Robert, Count of Clermont (1256 – 7 February 1317), married Beatrice of Burgundy, Lady of Bourbon, by whom he had issue. It is from him that the Bourbon kings of France descend in the male line.
11. Agnes (c. 1260 – 19 December 1327), married Robert II, Duke of Burgundy

== Sources ==
- Costain, Thomas B. (1951). The Magnificent Century. Garden City, N.Y., Doubleday.
- Emmerson, Richard K. (2013). Key Figures in Medieval Europe: An Encyclopedia. Routledge. ISBN 978-1-136-77519-2.
- Hodgson, Natasha (2007). Women, Crusading and the Holy Land in Historical Narrative. Boydell.
- Howell, Margaret (2001). Eleanor of Provence: Queenship in Thirteenth-Century England. Blackwell Publishers Ltd.
- Joinville; Villehardouin (1963). Shaw, M.R.B. (ed.). Joinville and Villehardouin: Chronicles of the Crusades. NY: Penguin Classics.
- Joinville; Villehardouin (2008). Smith, Caroline (ed.). Chronicles of the Crusades. Penguin Classics.
- Murray, Jacqueline (1999). Conflicted Identities and Multiple Masculinities.
- Richardson, Douglas (2011). Plantagenet Ancestry: A Study In Colonial And Medieval Families (2 ed.). Douglas Richardson. ISBN 978-1-461-04513-7.
- Robson, Michael (2007). "Queen Isabella (c.1295/1358) and the Greyfriars: An example of royal patronage based on her accounts for 1357/1358". Franciscan Studies. 65. Franciscan Institute Publications: 325–348. doi:10.1353/frc.2007.0006. S2CID 201794690.
- Sanders, I.J. (1951). "The Texts of the Peace of Paris, 1259". The English Historical Review. 66 (258). Oxford University Press: 81–97. doi:10.1093/ehr/lxvi.cclviii.81.
- Shadis, Miriam (2010). Berenguela of Castile (1180–1246) and Political Women in the High Middle Ages. Palgrave Macmillan. ISBN 978-0-312-23473-7.

Margaret of Provence House of Barcelona Cadet branch of the Bellonids Born: Spring 1221 Died: 21 December 1295
French royalty
Vacant Title next held by Blanche of Castile	Queen consort of France; 1234–1270	Succeeded by Isabella of Aragon
