= Louis I, Duke of Bourbon =

French prince (1279–1341)

Louis I
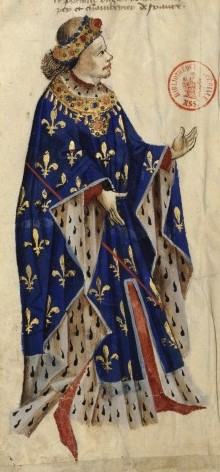
- 15th-century portrait of Louis

Duke of Bourbon
- Reign: 1327 – 1341
- Predecessor: Title established
- Successor: Peter I

Count of Clermont-en-Beauvaisis
- Reign: 1317 – 1327; 1331 – 1341
- Predecessor: Robert
- Successor: Peter I

Count of La Marche
- Reign: 1322 – 1341
- Predecessor: Charles IV, King of France
- Successor: James I
- Born: 1279; Clermont, Oise, France
- Died: 1341 (aged 61–62); France
- Spouse: Mary of Avesnes (m. 1310)
- Issue: Peter I, Duke of Bourbon; Joanna, Countess of Forez; Margaret of Bourbon; Marie, Latin Empress; Philip of Bourbon; James of Bourbon; James I, Count of La Marche; Beatrice, Queen of Bohemia
- House: Bourbon
- Father: Robert, Count of Clermont
- Mother: Beatrix of Burgundy

Louis I, called the Lame (1279 – 1341) was a French prince du sang, Count of Clermont-en-Beauvaisis and La Marche and the first Duke of Bourbon, as well as briefly the titular King of Thessalonica from 1320 to 1321.

== Early life ==
Louis was born in 1279 in the County of Clermont. He was the son of Robert, Count of Clermont, who was himself the youngest son of King Louis IX of France. Louis's mother was Beatrix of Burgundy, the heiress to the Lordship of Bourbon and a granddaughter of Hugh IV, Duke of Burgundy, through her father, John of Burgundy.

== Military career ==
In his early military career, Louis fought for the French army in its defeat at the Battle of the Golden Spurs (1302) and at the Battle of Mons-en-Pévèle (1304), surviving both engagements. In 1310, King Philip IV appointed him to the prestigious office of Grand Chamberlain of France. Louis took a formal crusading vow in 1316, becoming a crucesignatus ("one signed with the cross"), and in connection with this pledge, he founded a chivalric confraternity, the Order of the Holy Sepulchre.

Louis's crusading ambitions grew when, on September 13, 1318, King Philip V designated him captain-general of a planned crusade. However, this effort was brought to a halt in 1319 when the Ghibelline-controlled navy of Genoa destroyed the Franco-Papal fleet being assembled for the expedition. In 1320, Louis attempted to purchase the purely titular rights to the "Kingdom of Thessalonica" from Odo IV, Duke of Burgundy, for 40,000 livres. Philip of Taranto intervened with an identical offer that Odo accepted. To resolve the political tension from this, a subsequent agreement was made to betroth Louis's daughter, Beatrice, to Philip's son.

In 1327, King Charles IV arranged a strategic exchange with Louis, persuading him to cede the County of Clermont to the crown in return for the County of La Marche and the elevation of his primary holding, Bourbon, to a duchy-peerage. After Charles IV's death, Louis's crucial support for Philip VI's claim to the throne was rewarded in 1331 when the new king restored the County of Clermont to him, which he held in addition to La Marche and his new duchy. Louis remained central to French crusading plans until 1336, when Pope Benedict XII cancelled the venture due to the impending outbreak of the Hundred Years' War with England.

Duke Louis is reported by chroniclers to have suffered from a debilitating psychological condition, with historical accounts noting episodes of severe mental infirmity. This trait is believed by many modern historians to have been hereditary. Similar patterns of recurring mental illness were documented in his granddaughter, Joanna of Bourbon; her son, King Charles VI of France, who famously suffered from bouts of psychosis; and Charles's grandson, King Henry VI of England, who experienced periods of complete catatonic breakdown.

== Family and children ==
In 1310, Louis married Mary of Avesnes, daughter of John II of Avesnes, Count of Hainaut and Holland, by Philippa of Luxembourg. They had eight children together:

- Peter I, Duke of Bourbon (1311–1356), married Isabella of Valois, had issue. Peter was killed at the Battle of Poitiers.
- Joanna (1312–1402), married in 1324 Guigues VII, Count of Forez.
- Margaret (1313–1362), married on 6 July 1320 Jean II de Sully, married in 1346 Hutin de Vermeilles.
- Marie (1315–1387, Naples), married first in Nicosia in January 1330 Guy of Lusignan (d. 1343), titular Prince of Galilee, married second on 9 September 1347 Robert of Taranto, the titular Latin Emperor.
- Philip (1316 – aft. 1327).
- James (1318).
- James I, Count of La Marche (1319–1362), killed at the Battle of Brignais.
- Beatrice (1320 – 23 December 1383, Danvillers), married first at Vincennes in 1334 John of Luxembourg, King of Bohemia, as his second wife, married secondly c. 1347 Eudes II of Grancey (d. 1389).

With Jeanne de Bourbon-Lancy, dame de Clessy, Louis had several illegitimate children:

- Jean (ca. 1297–1375), "bâtard de Bourbon", knight, seigneur of Rochefort, Ébreuil, Beçay le Guérant, Bellenave, Jenzat, Serrant and la Bure, advisor to the dukes of Berry and Bourbon, lieutenant du Forez, married Agnès Chaleu for his third wife;
- "N" (eldest daughter), "bâtarde de Bourbon", married in 1317 to Girard of Châtillon-en-Bazois;
- Guy (vers 1299–1349), "bâtard de Bourbon", seigneur of Clessy, la Ferté-Chauderon and Montpensier (legitimized in 1346, but that same year he was again bastardized). Married in 1315 Agnès of Chastellus, then between 1330 and 1333 Isabelle of Chastelperron;
- Jeannette, "bâtarde de Bourbon", married in 1310 to Guichard of Chastellus.

== Death and burial ==
Duke Louis I died in 1341.

He was buried in the church of the Couvent des Jacobins in Paris. The priory was suppressed during the French Revolution, and the church was demolished in the early 19th century, at which time his tomb was lost or destroyed.

== Sources ==
- Boehm, Barbara Drake; Fajt, Jiří, eds. (2005). Prague: The Crown of Bohemia, 1347–1437. New York: Metropolitan Museum of Art. ISBN 1-58839-161-2.
- Boudet, Marcellin (1900). Documents historiques inedits du XIVe siecle: Thomas de La Marche, batard de France et ses Aventures (1318-1361) (in French). Chez Ulysse Jouvet, Imprimeur-Editeur.
- Desmond, Karen (2018). Music and the moderni, 1300–1350: The ars nova in Theory and Practice. Cambridge: Cambridge University Press. ISBN 9781316617793.
- Georgiou, Constantinos (2018). Preaching the Crusades to the Eastern Mediterranean: Propaganda, Liturgy and Diplomacy, 1305–1352. London: Routledge. ISBN 978-1-138-74370-0.
- Heers, Jacques (2003). Louis XI. Paris: Tempus Perrin. ISBN 9782262020842.
- Henneman, John Bell Jr. (1995). "Bourbon/Bourbonnais". In Kibler, William W.; Zinn, Grover A.; Henneman, John Bell Jr.; Earp, Lawrence (eds.). Medieval France: An Encyclopedia. New York: Garland Publishing Inc. ISBN 0-8240-4444-4.
- Nicolle, David (2004). Poitiers 1356: The capture of a king. Oxford, UK: Osprey Publishing. ISBN 1-84176-516-3.
- Sumption, Jonathan (1999). The Hundred Years War:Trial by Fire. Vol. II. Philadelphia: University of Pennsylvania Press. ISBN 0-8122-1655-5.
- Thompson, James Westfall (1909). The Wars of Religion in France, 1559-1576. Chicago: The University of Chicago Press.
- Topping, Peter (1975). "The Morea, 1311–1364". In Setton, Kenneth M.; Hazard, Harry W. (eds.). A History of the Crusades, Volume III: The Fourteenth and Fifteenth Centuries. Vol. 3. Madison and London: University of Wisconsin Press. pp. 104–140. ISBN 0-299-06670-3.
- Verbruggen, J. F. (1997). The Art of Warfare in Western Europe During the Middle Ages: From the Eighth Century to 1340. Translated by Willard, Colonel Sumner (Second ed.). Woodbridge: The Boydell Press. ISBN 0-85115-570-7.
- Verbruggen, J. F. (2002). DeVries, Kelly (ed.). The Battle of the Golden Spurs (Courtrai, 11 July 1302). Translated by Ferguson, David Richard. Woodbridge: The Boydell Press. ISBN 978-0851158884.
- Viard, Jules (1937). Les Grandes Chroniques de France (in French). Vol. Tome Neuvième. Paris: Société d'histoire de France.
- Warner, Kathryn (2016). Isabella of France: The Rebel Queen. The Hill, Stroud, Gloucester, UK: Amberley Publishing. ISBN 9781445647401.

| Preceded by Robert | Count of Clermont-en-Beauvaisis; 1317–1327 | Vacant Royal domain |
| New title | Duke of Bourbon; 1327–1342 | Succeeded by Peter I |
| Vacant Title last held by Charles the Fair | Count of La Marche; 1327–1342 | Succeeded by Peter I |
| Vacant Royal domain | Count of Clermont-en-Beauvaisis; 1331–1342 | Succeeded by Peter I |
