= Archambaud VIII of Bourbon =

French nobleman (1189–1242)

- Born: 1189
- Died: 1242 (aged 52–53)
- Noble family: House of Bourbon-Dampierre
- Spouse: Guigone de Forez: Beatrice de Montluçon
- Issue: Margaret; Archambaud IX of Bourbon; William; Marie; Beatrice
- Father: Guy II of Dampierre
- Mother: Mathilde of Bourbon

Archambaud VIII of Bourbon, nicknamed the Great (1189–1242), was a ruler (sire) of Bourbonnais in the modern region of Auvergne, France. His parents were Guy II of Dampierre and Mathilde of Bourbon.

Archambaud’s first wife was Alix de Forez. They married in 1205. Before she was repudiated, Alix bore:

- Margaret
- Archambaud IX of Bourbon (Note: De Vaivre and Devailly indicate Archambaud and his siblings' mother as Beatrix.)

Archambaud later married Beatrice de Montluçon, who bore him;

- William (Seigneur of Beçay)
- Marie, (1220-1274) wife of John I of Dreux
- Beatrice, wife of Beraud VI of Mercœur

== Sources ==
- Devailly, Guy (1973). Le Berry du X siecle au milieu du XIII (in French). Mouton & Co.
- Evergates, Theodore (2007). The Aristocracy in the County of Champagne, 1100–1300. University of Pennsylvania Press.
- Fassler, Margot Elsbeth (2010). The Virgin of Chartres: Making History Through Liturgy and the Arts. Yale University Press.
- Schenk, Jochen (2012). Templar Families: Landowning Families and the Order of the Temple in France, c. 1120–1307. Cambridge University Press.
- Stirnemann, Patricia (1993). "Some Champenois Vernacular Manuscripts and the Manerius Style of Illumination". In Busby, Keith; Nixon, Terry; Stones, Alison; Walters, Lori (eds.). Les Manuscrits de Chrétien de Troyes (in French). Vol. 1. Rodopi B.V.
- de Vaivre, Jean-Bernard (1980). "Les tombeaux des sires de Bourbon (XIIIe et première partie du XIVe siècles)". Bulletin Monumental Année. 138–4: 365–403.

Archambaud VIII of Bourbon House of Bourbon-Dampierre Born: 1189 Died: 1242
| Preceded by Mathilde | Sire de Bourbon | Succeeded by Archambaud IX |
