= John Tristan =

French prince

- Count of Valois
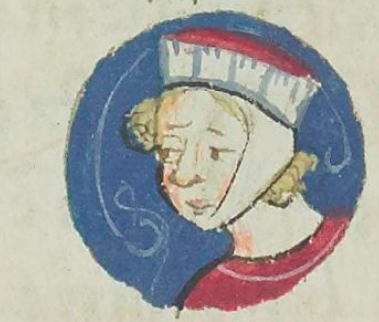
- Illustration by Bernard Gui, 14th century
- Born: 8 April 1250; Damietta, Egypt
- Died: 3 August 1270 (aged 20); Tunis, Tunisia
- Burial: Basilica of St Denis
- Spouse: Yolande II, Countess of Nevers (m. 1266)
- House: Capet
- Father: Louis IX of France
- Mother: Margaret of Provence

John Tristan (French: Jean Tristan; 8 April 1250 – 3 August 1270) was a French prince of the Capetian dynasty. He was jure uxoris count of Nevers from 1265 and of Auxerre and Tonnerre from 1268. He was also in his own right Count of Valois and Crépy, as an appanages of the crown, from 1268.

== Birth and childhood ==
John was born in Damietta, Egypt. He was the sixth child and the fourth son of King Louis IX of France, called St. Louis after canonisation, and Margaret of Provence. Moreover, he was the first of three children of this royal couple who were born during the Seventh Crusade. He was born at the Egyptian port town of Damietta which had been conquered by the crusaders in 1249.

According to chronicler Jean de Joinville, an old knight acted as midwife during John's birth. Two days prior to his birth, the king was captured by the Mamluks which was the reason to name the child Tristan due to the triste (sad) occasion. He was baptised in the grand mosque of Damietta that had been re-consecrated into a church. One month later, Damietta had to be abandoned. John subsequently spent his childhood in the Holy Land where his siblings Peter (1251) and Blanche (1253) were born.

== Marriage ==
His father wished that John join the Dominican Order, but John resisted this wish successfully. In 1266, he was married to Yolande II, Countess of Nevers (1247–1280), making him Count of Nevers, Auxerre and Tonnere. In 1268, John was made Count of Valois and Crépy in his own right by his father, which was a gift he received as paréage.

== Crusade ==
Two years later, John accompanied his father during the Eighth Crusade, which reached Tunis in July after setting out from Cagliari on Sardinia. But at Tunis the army suffered an outbreak of dysentery. John Tristan was one of the victims who died of it, and three weeks later, St. Louis also succumbed to the disease. Both bodies were transported to France and buried in the Basilica of St Denis.

John's marriage remained childless. His widow married again in 1272 with Robert III of Flanders; the county of Valois, his prerogative, returned to the Crown.

== Notes ==
French nobility
Preceded by Yolande II	Count of Nevers; 1265–1270 with Yolande II	Succeeded by Yolande II
Vacant Royal domain Title last held by Eleanor	Count of Valois; 1268–1270	Vacant Title next held by Charles
