= Beatrice of Burgundy, Lady of Bourbon =

French noblewoman

Beatrice of Burgundy
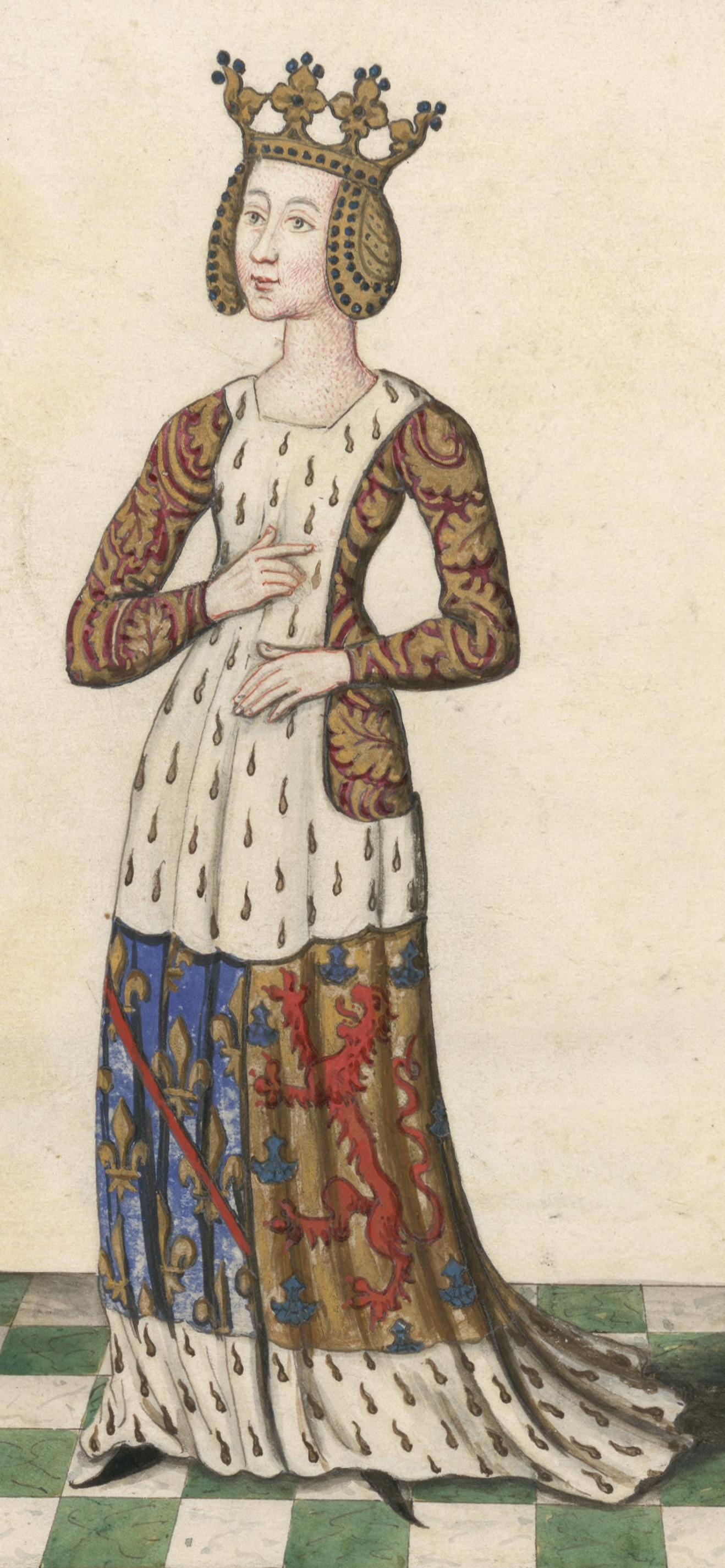
- Beatrice of Burgundy
- Born: 1257
- Died: 1 October 1310 (aged 52 or 53)
- Noble family: Burgundy
- Spouse: Robert, Count of Clermont
- Issue: Louis I, Duke of Bourbon; Blanche, Countess of Auvergne and Boulogne; John of Charolais; Mary of Clermont, Prioress of Poissy; Peter of Clermont, Archdeacon of Paris; Margaret, Countess of Andria, Marchioness of Namur
- Father: John of Burgundy
- Mother: Agnes of Dampierre

Beatrice of Burgundy (1257 – 1 October 1310) was ruling Lady of Bourbon from 1288 to 1310, and, through her mother, heiress of all Bourbon estates.

She was the daughter of John of Burgundy (son of Hugh IV, Duke of Burgundy) and Agnes of Dampierre, Lady of Bourbon. In 1272, Beatrice married Robert, Count of Clermont and their eldest son Louis I, le Boiteux became the first Duke of Bourbon.

== Issue ==
Robert and Beatrice had the following children:

- Louis I, le Boiteux (1279–1342), first Duke of Bourbon
- Blanche (1281–1304), married in 1303 in Paris Robert VII, Count of Auvergne and Boulogne, grandmother of Joan I, Countess of Auvergne
- John (1283–1322), Baron of Charolais, married c. 1309 Jeanne d'Argies and had issue
- Mary (1285–1372, Paris), Prioress of Poissy
- Peter (1287 – aft. 1330), Archdeacon of Paris
- Margaret (1289–1309, Paris), married firstly in 1305 Raymond Berengar of Andria (who died in 1307) and secondly in 1308 John I, Marquis of Namur

== Physical appearance ==
Ottone and Acerbo Morena in their Historia Frederici I described Beatrice as "[O]f medium height, her hair shone like gold, her face most beautiful..."

== See also ==
- Dukes of Bourbon family tree

Preceded by Agnes	Dame de Bourbon; 1288-1310	Succeeded by Robert
