= Robert, Count of Clermont =

French nobleman, Son of Louis IX (1256–1317)

Robert
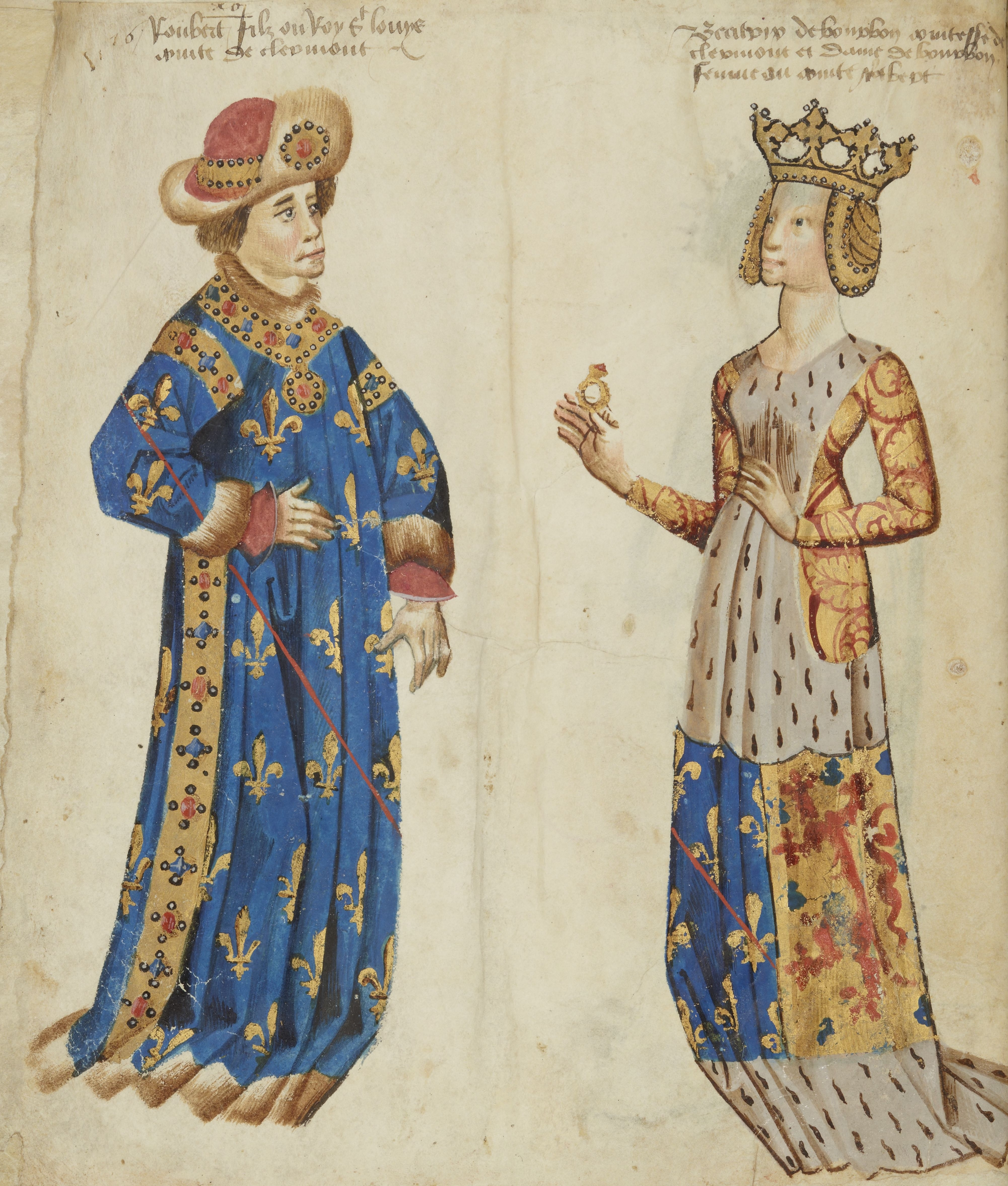
- Robert and his wife Beatrice

Count of Clermont
- Reign: 1268 – 7 February 1317
- Successor: Louis I, Duke of Bourbon
- Born: 1256
- Died: 7 February 1317 (aged 60–61)
- Spouse: Beatrice of Burgundy (m. 1272; died 1310)
- Issue: Louis I, Duke of Bourbon; Blanche, Countess of Auvergne and Boulogne; John of Charolais; Mary of Clermont, Prioress of Poissy; Peter of Clermont, Archdeacon of Paris; Margaret, Countess of Andria, Marchioness of Namur
- House: Capet; Bourbon (founder)
- Father: Louis IX of France
- Mother: Margaret of Provence

Robert of Clermont (1256 – 7 February 1317) was a French prince du sang who was created Count of Clermont in 1268. He was the sixth and last son of King Louis IX (Saint Louis) and Margaret of Provence.

Although he played a minor role in his lifetime due to a head injury which left him handicapped at a young age, he had an important dynastic position as the founder of the House of Bourbon, to which he passed the rights to the throne of France from his father when all male-line branches descended from his elder brothers died out in 1589, nine generations after him.

== Early life ==
Robert was born in 1256 as the sixth and youngest son of King Louis IX of France (Saint Louis) and Margaret of Provence. Robert's godfather, chosen by Louis IX, was Humbert of Romans, the Dominican Master of the Order at the time of Robert's birth.

== Marriage and children ==
In 1272, Robert married Beatrice of Burgundy, heiress of Bourbon, and had the following issue:

- Louis I, le Boiteux (1279–1341), first Duke of Bourbon.
- Blanche of Clermont (1281–1304); married in 1303 in Paris Robert VII, Count of Auvergne and Boulogne, grandmother of Joan I, Countess of Auvergne.
- John of Clermont (1283–1316), Baron of Charolais; married c. 1309 Jeanne d'Argues, widow of Hugh, Count of Soissons, and had issue.
- Mary of Clermont (1285–1372, Paris), Prioress of Poissy
- Peter of Clermont (1287 – aft. 1330), Archdeacon of Paris
- Margaret of Clermont (1289–1309, Paris); married firstly, in 1305, Raymond Berengar of Andria, and secondly, in 1308, John I, Marquis of Namur.

== Health problems ==
During his first joust, in 1279, Robert suffered head injuries which rendered him an invalid for the remainder of his life.

== Written records ==
Robert is mentioned in the prologue of the Coutumes de Beauvaisis by Philippe de Beaumanoir.

== Death ==
He was buried in the now-demolished church of the Couvent des Jacobins in Paris.

== Depictions in fiction ==
Robert is a supporting character in Les Rois maudits (The Accursed Kings), a series of French historical novels by Maurice Druon. He was portrayed by Alexandre Rignault in the 1972 French miniseries adaptation of the series, and by Ioan Siminie in the 2005 adaptation.

== See also ==
- Bourbon family tree
- French monarchs family tree

Robert, Count of Clermont House of Bourbon Cadet branch of the Capetian dynasty Born: 1256 Died: 7 February 1317
Preceded by —	Count of Clermont-en-Beauvaisis; 1268–1317	Succeeded by Louis I
