= Hugh IV of Burgundy =

Duke of Burgundy from 1218 to 1272

Hugh IV
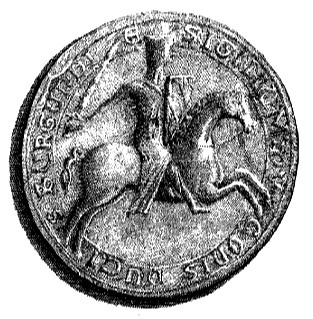

Duke of Burgundy
- Reign: 1218–1272
- Predecessor: Odo III
- Successor: Robert II
- Born: 9 March 1213; Villaines-en-Duesmois
- Died: 27 October 1272 (aged 59); France
- Spouse: Yolande of Dreux; Beatrice of Navarre
- Issue Detail: Odo, Count of Nevers; John, Lord of Bourbon; Adelaide, Duchess of Brabant; Robert II, Duke of Burgundy; Isabella, Queen of Germany
- House: House of Burgundy
- Father: Odo III, Duke of Burgundy
- Mother: Alice of Vergy

Hugh IV (9 March 1213 – 27 or 30 October 1272) was Duke of Burgundy from 1218 and titular King of Thessalonica from 1266 until his death in 1272. He was the son of Odo III, Duke of Burgundy, and Alice de Vergy.

== Issue ==
Hugh married twice, first to Yolande of Dreux when he was 16 and she 17 years of age. He then married Beatrice of Navarre, when he was 45.

Hugh and Yolande had:

- Margaret, Lady of Molinot (1230s–1277), married first to William III, lord of Mont St Jean and then to Guy VI, viscount of Limoges; their daughter was the first wife of Duke Arthur II of Brittany
- Odo (1230–1266), who married Countess Matilda II of Nevers
- John (1231–1268), who married Agnes of Dampierre and had Beatrice, heiress of Bourbon
- Adelaide, who married Duke Henry III of Brabant
- Robert II (1248–1306), successor in the Duchy of Burgundy

Hugh and Beatrice had:

- Hugh, viscount of Avallon
- Margaret, lady of Vitteaux, wife of John I of Chalon-Arlay
- Joan, a nun
- Beatrice, lady of Grignon (ca.1260–1329), who married Hugh XIII of Lusignan
- Isabella, who married King Rudolf I of Germany

== Early years ==
His father died during the war of War of the Succession of Champagne in 1218. Hugh was an opponent of the regency of the County of Champagne by Blanche of Castile. With his father's death in 1218, he switched sides and joined the rebels in 1229. This led to blows with Theobald IV, Count of Champagne.

Hugh IV, through a transaction with John l'Antique de Chalon, gave up the barony of Salon for the counties of Chalon and Auxonne in 1237, which expanded the Duchy and the regional economy benefited from the growing wine trade.

== Crusades ==
In 1239, Hugh joined the Barons' Crusade led by King Theobald I of Navarre and supported by Frederick II, Holy Roman Emperor. During this crusade, he was one of the nobles who sought battle with the Muslims against the advice of King Theobald and the Military Orders. Realizing that the expedition was disadvantageous, he opted to withdraw to Ascalon with Walter IV, Count of Brienne and a few others, avoiding the disastrous battle of Gaza. Soon after, King Theobald left for France and Richard of Cornwall arrived. He chose to ally with him, aid in rebuilding Ascalon and negotiated a peace with Egypt in 1241. He returned to Burgundy afterwards.

Hugh arrived at Cyprus by May 1249 and joined Louis IX of France on the Seventh Crusade. He led one of the two camps of the army that crossed during the siege of Mansurah, the other camp being led by the King of France himself. He was taken prisoner with his king during the retreat of Fariskur, following the betrayal of a treacherous sergeant. He would not be released until March 1252, as such he returned home.

In 1266, Hugh met with Baldwin II, Latin Emperor, who promised Hugh the principality of Thessalonica in exchange for reconquering lands lost to Epirus more than 40 years earlier. The sale would only remain valid until Hugh aided in Baldwin's reconquest and should he fail to uphold his end, the title would pass to Charles I of Anjou and his heirs. The invasion wouldn't come to pass, as Pope Gregory X, under the false promise of Emperor Michael VIII Palaiologos to unite the churches, staved off any attempts.

In 1270, Hugh joined the Eighth Crusade. But after King Louis IX died, he returned home.

== Death ==
Hugh IV died on 27 October 1272 (Aged 60) at Villaines-en-Duismois, France. His burial place is unknown.

== See also ==
- Dukes of Burgundy family tree

== Sources ==
- Bradbury, Jim (2007). The Capetians: The History of a Dynasty. Bloomsbury Publishing.
- Cox, Eugene (1999). "The kingdom of Burgundy, the lands of the house of Savoy and adjacent territories". In Abulafia, David (ed.). The New Cambridge Medieval History, Volume 5, c.1198–c.1300. Cambridge: Cambridge University Press. ISBN 978-1-13905573-4.
- Demarthe, Sylvain (2015). "Alix de Vergy et l'architecture religieuse en Bourgogne dans la première moitié du XIIIe siècle". Bulletin du centre d'études médiévales d'Auxerre (in French). 19 (2).
- Dunbabin, Jean (2011). The French in the Kingdom of Sicily, 1266–1305. Cambridge University Press. ISBN 978-0-521-19878-3.
- Evergates, Theodore (2011). Aristocratic Women in Medieval France. University of Pennsylvania Press.
- Lock, Peter (2006). The Routledge Companion to the Crusades. Routledge.
- Lower, Michael (2005). The Barons' Crusade: A Call to Arms and Its Consequences. University of Pennsylvania Press.
- Morvan, Frederic (2009). La Chevalerie bretonne et la formation de l'armee ducale, 1260-1341. Presses Universitaires de Rennes. ISBN 978-2-7535-0827-9.
- Richard, Jean (1999). The Crusades, C.1071-c.1291. Cambridge University Press.
- Setton, Kenneth M. (1976). The Papacy and the Levant (1204–1571), Volume I: The Thirteenth and Fourteenth Centuries. Vol. 1. Philadelphia: The American Philosophical Society. ISBN 0-87169-114-0.

Hugh IV of Burgundy House of Burgundy Cadet branch of the Capetian dynasty Born: 9 March 1213 Died: 27 October 1272
Preceded by Odo III	Duke of Burgundy; 1218–1272	Succeeded by Robert II
