= County of Tonnerre =

Coordinates: 47.86°N 3.97°E

Tonnerre Pagus Tornodorensis
- County
- France in 1477. Tonnerre is in green.
- Country: France
- Region: Yonne
- Established: 8th Century
- Seat: Tonnerre

The County of Tonnerre (Latin pagus Tornodorensis) was east of Auxerre and south of Troyes, centred on the town of Tonnerre in the Yonne region of France. It was set up in the 8th century as a fiefdom of the bishops of Langres, and first became centred on Tonnerre in the 9th century. Through marriage the family also gained the county of Bar-sur-Seine, although the Tonnerre family then became extinct two generations later, with Bar-sur-Seine passing to the counts of Brienne and the county of Tonnerre passing to the dukes of Nevers and Auxerre.

After that Tonnerre, Nevers and Auxerre came back together at the division of 1273, but they soon became Tonnerre and Auxerre again, and remained so until John IV of Chalon sold Auxerre to the king of France in 1370 and restricted himself to Tonnerre. His grandson Louis II of Chalon got into a dispute with John the Fearless due to the kidnapping of Jeanne de Perellos, a lady of the Burgundian court, and opposed him politically - he thus had Tonnerre confiscated from him in 1414. Philip the Good handed the county to Arthur de Richemont, who later became constable of France (known as Constable of Richemont) and duke of Brittany (1457–1458) to its brother-in-law. However, it was returned to the previous Tonnerre family by the Treaty of Arras but the last male member of that family had died in the meantime and it passed to a sister of the last count by his marriage with Olivier de Husson.
