= Henry I of Navarre =

King of Navarre from 1270 to 1274

Henry I
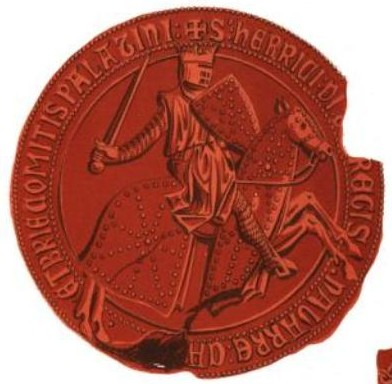

King of Navarre Count of Champagne
- Reign: 1270–1274
- Predecessor: Theobald II
- Successor: Joan I
- Born: c. 1244
- Died: 22 July 1274; Pamplona
- Burial: Pamplona Cathedral
- Spouse: Blanche of Artois
- Issue: Theobald of Navarre; Joan I of Navarre
- House: House of Blois; House of Blois-Champagne; House of Blois-Navarre
- Father: Theobald I of Navarre
- Mother: Margaret of Bourbon

Henry the Fat (Basque: Henrike I.a, Gizena, French: Henri le Gros, Spanish: Enrique el Gordo) (c. 1244 – 22 July 1274) was King of Navarre (as Henry I) and Count of Champagne and Brie (as Henry III) from 1270 until his death.

== Early life ==
Henry was the youngest son of Theobald I of Navarre and Margaret of Bourbon. During the reign of his childless older brother Theobald II he held the regency during many of Theobald's numerous absences. In 1269, Henry married Blanche of Artois, daughter of the then-reigning King Louis IX of France's brother Count Robert I of Artois. He was thus in the "Angevin" circle in international politics.

== Reign ==
Coat of arms

Recognized as heir presumptive during his brother's reign, Henry succeeded to the thrones of the Kingdom of Navarre and County of Champagne upon Theobald II's death in December 1270. Henry I's proclamation at Pamplona, however, did not take place until the following year, 1 March 1271, and his coronation was delayed until May 1273. His first act was the swear to uphold the Fueros of Navarre and then go to perform homage to Philip III of France for Champagne.

Henry came to the throne at the height of an economic boom in Navarre that was not happening elsewhere in Iberia at as great a rate. But by the Treaty of Paris (1259), the English had been ceded rights in Gascony that effectively cut off Navarrese access to the ocean (since France, Navarre's ally, was at odds with England). Henry allowed the Pamplonese burg of Navarrería to disentangle itself from the union of San Cernin and San Nicolás, effected in 1266. He also granted privileges to the towns of Estella, Los Arcos, and Viana, fostering urban growth. His relations with the nobility were, on the whole, friendly, though he was prepared to maintain the peace of his realm at nearly any cost.

Henry initially sought to recover territory lost to Castile by assisting the revolt of King Alfonso X of Castile's brother Philip in 1270. He eventually declined, preferring to establish an alliance with Castile through the marriage of his son Theobald to Alfonso X's daughter Violant in September 1272. This failed with the death of the young Theobald after he fell from a battlement at the castle of Estella in 1273.

== Death and legacy ==
Henry did not long outlive his son. He was suffocated, according to the generally received accounts, by his own fat. His only legitimate child, a one-year-old daughter named Joan, succeeded him under the regency of her mother Blanche. Joan's marriage in 1284 to Philip the Fair, the future King of France, in the same year united the crown of Navarre to that of France and saw Champagne devolve to the French royal domain.

In the Divine Comedy, Dante Alighieri, a younger contemporary, sees Henry's spirit outside the gates of Purgatory, where he is grouped with a number of other European monarchs of the 13th century. Henry is not named directly, but is referred to as "the kindly-faced" and "the father-in-law of the Plague of France".

== Notes ==
Henry I of Navarre House of Blois Born: c. 1244 Died: 22 July 1274
Regnal titles
Preceded by Theobald the Young	King of Navarre; Count of Champagne; 1270–1274	Succeeded by Joan I
