= Theobald II of Navarre =

King of Navarre from 1253 to 1270

Theobald II
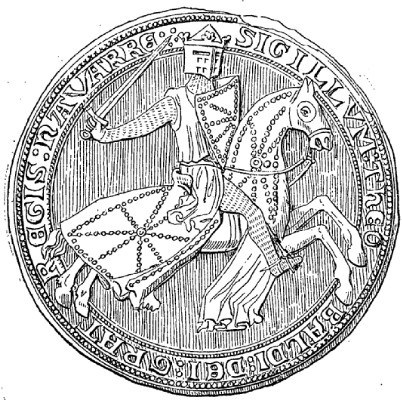
- Royal seal depicting Theobald II

King of Navarre Count of Champagne
- Reign: 1253 – 1270
- Predecessor: Theobald I
- Successor: Henry I
- Born: c. 1238
- Died: 4 December 1270 (aged 31–32); Provins, France
- Spouse: Isabella of France
- House: House of Blois
- Father: Theobald I of Navarre
- Mother: Margaret of Bourbon

Theobald II (Note: French: Thibaut or Thibaud, Spanish: Teobaldo) (6/7 December 1239 – 4/5 December 1270) was King of Navarre and also, as Theobald V, Count of Champagne and Brie, from 1253 until his death. He was the son and successor of Theobald I and the second Navarrese monarch of the House of Blois. After he died childless, the throne of Navarre passed to his younger brother, Henry I.

== Biography ==
=== Early years ===
Theobald was the eldest son of Theobald I of Navarre and his third wife, Margaret of Bourbon. He succeeded to his father's titles on his death at only fourteen years of age. His mother acted as regent with James I of Aragon until 1256, when Theobald came of age. On 27 November, he affirmed the Fueros of Navarre, which limited his power by putting him under the counsel of a tutor from among the aristocracy. He could not make judgements without a council of twelve (a jury) of noblemen. Theobald was not content, however, to be so restricted in royal prerogative before his twenty-first birthday. He received the rites of unction and coronation from Pope Alexander IV in 1257 and 1259 respectively and tried to justify his divine right to rule, a concept foreign until that point in Navarrese politics.

=== Domestic policy ===
In order to counter the tendency to decentralisation, diminish the power of the nobility, and evade the control of the fueros on him, Theobald turned to the bourgeoisie. He exacted extraordinary taxes and imposts from them, but they supported him nevertheless because he granted them rights, prestige, and political clout. He extended the fueros of Pamplona to Lantz and Estella to Tiebas—nowadays in ruins and depopulated—and Torralba Del Río. He founded Espinal (Aurizberri, near Roncesvalles) in 1269.

Theobald continued the power struggle with the bishop of Pamplona started during his father's reign. The former stood by his native Basque parishioners of the Navarreria borough, while Theobald championed the Saint Nicolas borough of Pamplona, made up of Occitans hailing from southern France. Eventually he tried to put an end to the fights between boroughs in 1266, pushing an agreement among the councils of the three Pamplonese boroughs—not that it avoided ultimately the destructive war of the Navarreria in 1276.

In other affairs, Theobald continued the policies of his father. He improved the royal administration, of incomes and expenditures, and administered the first census. The count of 1266 indicated a population of 150,000 inhabitants in Navarre. Approximately 6.75% of royal revenues were spent on a bureaucracy, 33.84% on the military, and 59.6% to the maintenance of the monarch and his household and duties.

=== French alliance ===
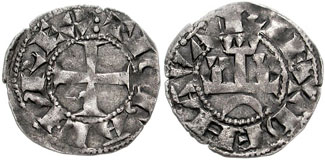
A dinero from Theobald II's reign, bearing the inscription Tiobald rex de Navarie

Theobald found support in Louis IX of France, who supported his fellow kings against their vassals with consistency. Theobald married Isabella, Louis's daughter, on 6 April 1255. Theobald acted as an advisor of Louis and Louis as an arbiter in Navarre's internal problems. When Alfonso X of Castile's daughter Berengaria was betrothed to Louis IX of France's son Louis, Castile ceded the use of the ports of Fuenterrabía and San Sebastián to Navarre on 1 January 1256.

In July 1270, Theobald embarked with his father-in-law on the Eighth Crusade to Tunis. Louis died of dysentery at the siege. Theobald died childless at Trapani in Sicily while returning that same year. He was succeeded by his younger brother, Henry I. His widow Isabella returned home to France, where she died a few months later and was buried at Provins.

== See also ==
- Ciampolo, a soul found by Dante in the Inferno who defrauded Theobald

== Sources ==
- Evergates, Theodore (2007). The Aristocracy in the County of Champagne, 1100-1300. University of Pennsylvania Press.
- Evergates, Theodore (2010). Aristocratic Women in Medieval France. University of Pennsylvania Press.
- García Arancón, María Raquel (2018), "Teobaldo II", Diccionario Biográfico electrónico, Real Academia de la Historia
- Hallam, Elizabeth (1980). Capetian France: 987-1328. Longman Group Limited.
- Peter of Ickham (2012). Glover, John (ed.). Le Livere de Reis de Brittanie, E, Le Livere de Reis de Engleterre (in French). Cambridge University Press.
- Sibly, W. A.; Sibly, M. D., eds. (2003). The Chronicle of William of Puylaurens. Boydell Press.

Regnal titles
Preceded by Theobald the Troubadour	King of Navarre; Count of Champagne; 1253–1270	Succeeded by Henry the Fat
