= Guigues IV of Forez =

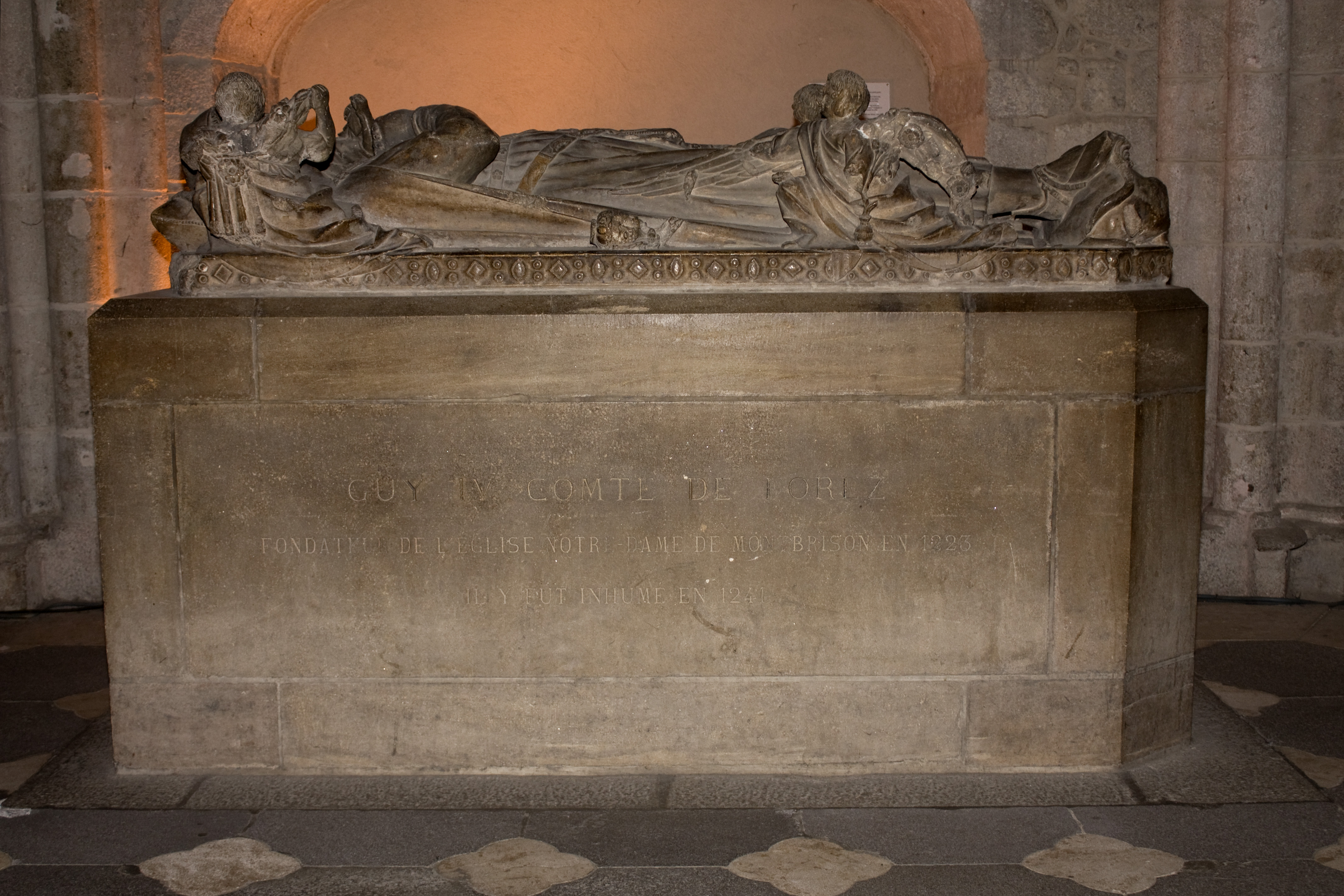
Guigues's sepulchre in the church he founded at Montbrison

Guigues IV or Guy IV (Note: He may be numbered Guigues V if Guigues-Raymond is counted at the start of the family line. Guigues-Raymond was the son of Count Guigues II of Albon. He married Ide-Raymond, daughter of Artaud III of Forez, and fathered Guigues I of Forez.) (died 10 August or 29 October 1241) was the count of Forez, Auxerre and Tonnerre from 1203 and the count of Nevers from 1226. He was still a child when his father, Guigues III, died on the Fourth Crusade and he inherited Forez. His mother was Alix and his uncle, Renaud, archbishop of Lyon, acted as regent until he came of age in 1218.

Guigues's first wife was Mahaut, daughter of Guy II of Dampierre. In 1223, Guigues granted a communal charter to the town of Montbrison. On 16 April 1224, he returned the places of Saint-Rambert, Bonson, Chambles, Saint-Cyprien and Saint-Just to the monastery of Île Barbe, declaring that they were allods held freely and that he and his predecessors had unjustly possessed them. In 1224, Guigues also founded a collegiate church of thirteen canons at Montbrison, dedicating it to the Virgin Mary. The foundation of Notre-Dame-d'Espérance was confirmed by Archbishop Renaud in October 1224. The charter of foundation mandated that the canons be in residence for at least six months of the year.

In 1226, Guigues married Matilda, daughter of Peter II of Courtenay, countess of Nevers and widow of Hervé IV of Donzy. With the death of her son-in-law, Guy of Châtillon, at the siege of Avignon that same year, Guigues became count of Nevers.

In 1235, Guigues joined the Barons' Crusade. He came from an illustrious crusading family. His father had gone on the Fourth Crusade and his ancestor Count William III had joined the First Crusade. Likewise, his wife's family had crusaders in every generation going back to the Crusade of 1101. Guigues IV's primary motivation for crusading was to remove the sentence of excommunication that had been placed him for the alleged spoliation of monasteries and sheltering heretics. Likewise, by taking the crusader vow Guigues received relief from interest payments on his large debts and extensions on repayment of principal.

When the Barons' Crusade finally set out in 1239, Guigues left his counties under the government of Matilda in his absence. He and his retinue—at least a chaplain, William of Vichy; two squires; and a physician—were part of the army of King Theobald I of Navarre. Theobald's county of Bar-sur-Seine bordered Guigues's county of Nevers and in the 1220s the two had a brief boundary dispute. Theobald left the Holy Land to return home in September 1240, Guigues and Duke Hugh IV of Burgundy stayed behind to construct a fortress at Ascalon. The poet Eustache le Peintre de Reims wrote a short song in Old French, Amours, coment porroie chancon faire, about Guigues's participation in the Crusade.

While in the Holy Land, Guigues received a relic of the True Cross from the Master of the Temple, Armand de Périgord. He died at Castellaneta in Italy while returning from his crusade. His body was brought back to Forez and lies in the church he had founded at Montbrison.

In his will, Guigues names his two children: his successor, Guigues V, and his younger son, Renaud. He expressed the wish that Renaud would enter the church. He left the relic of the cross to his eldest son. He named as his executors Jean de Bernin, the archbishop of Vienne; Beatrice, the countess of Albon; the abbot of Bénissons-Dieu; and the dean of Montbrison.
