= Matilda I of Nevers =

Countess of Nevers, France (1188–1257)

Matilda I, Countess of Nevers or Mathilde de Courtenay, or Mahaut de Courtenay, (1188–1257), was a ruling countess of Nevers, Auxerre and Tonnerre. She was the only daughter of Peter II of Courtenay and of Agnes of Nevers, born from the Capetian House of Courtenay, she was married to Hervé IV of Donzy and then to Guigues IV of Forez.

== Life ==
Arms of the Capetian House of Courtenay

By his marriage to Agnes of Nevers, Peter II of Courtenay, a cousin of King Philip II Augustus, became Count of Nevers, Auxerre and Tonnerre in 1184. Four years later, the couple became the parents of a daughter, Matilda.

In 1198, Matilda's father was caught up in a dispute with Hervé IV of Donzy which concerned the possession of the château de Gien. Hervé succeeded in defeating his opponent at Cosne-sur-Loire and captured him. Through the mediation of Philip II Augustus, the parties came to an agreement in 1199. To recover his freedom, Peter had to give his daughter Matilda in marriage to Hervé de Donzy and cede him the county of Nevers. The marriage was closed in October 1199, probably on the 20th. It was agreed that the counties of Auxerre and Tonnerre would become the property of Hervé at the death of Peter II.

In 1209, Hervé and Matilda founded the monastery of Bellary and the Abbey of Notre-Dame de l'Épeau in 1211, a year before obtaining Pope Innocent III's consent to the marriage held in 1205 and was only granted in 1212. They richly endowed their religious establishments.

=== Reign ===
Following her father's death, Matilda inherited the counties of Auxerre and Tonnerre. Hervé, who was on the Fifth Crusade, returned to Europe immediately on the news, and was successful in getting Peter's counties under his control. Two years later, Matilda and Hervé's daughter Agnes was married to Guy IV de Châtillon, Count of Saint-Pol.

Hervé de Donzy died on 22 January 1222, at Saint-Aignan. His death has been attributed to poison. Four years later, Matilda married Guigues IV of Forez.

Very popular because of her generosity, she signed a charter of postage to the deputies sent by Auxerre on August 15, 1223 at Château de Druyes. The charter granted freedoms and enfranchisement to the inhabitants of Auxerre and marked the birth of their commune; it was confirmed by Pierre de Courtenay in 1188. She founded the abbey of Notre-Dame of the Reconfort of Saizy for Cistercian nuns in 1235 and increased its allocation in 1244.

In 1257, she confirmed that Château de Druyes, where she frequently resided, became the property of Reigny Abbey. That same year she exchanged her mill at Pont-Cizeau with the monks of the Abbey of Saint-Martin de Nevers, with a rent of 100 sous.

She died on July 29, 1257 at the castle of Coulanges-sur-Yonne, and was buried in the abbey Notre-Dame of the Reconfort of Saizy. Her great-granddaughter Matilda II succeeded her as Countess of Nevers, Auxerre and Tonnerre.

== Issue ==
From her first marriage with Hervé of Donzy:

- William, died between 1207 and 1214, engaged to Beatrice of Viennois
- Agnes of Donzy (1205–1225), married in 1217 Philip, eldest son of the future King Louis VIII of France. Philip died the following year. Agnes then married in 1221 Guy of Châtillon (died 1226), and had the daughter Yolande of Châtillon, who married Archambaud IX of Bourbon.

From her second marriage with Guigues IV of Forez:

- Artaude, married to Artaud IV of Roussillon, widower of Marie of Geneva, lord of Roussillon and other places.

== Sources ==
- Berman, Constance H. (2018). The White Nuns: Cistercian Abbeys for Women in Medieval France. University of Pennsylvania Press.
- Bouchard, Constance Brittain (1987). Sword, Miter, and Cloister: Nobility and the Church in Burgundy, 980–1198. Cornell University Press.
- Evergates, Theodore (2007). The Aristocracy in the County of Champagne, 1100–1300. University of Pennsylvania Press.
- Kupfer, Marcia (2003). The Art of Healing: Painting for the Sick and the Sinner in a Medieval Town. Pennsylvania State University Press.
- Perry, Guy (2013). John of Brienne: King of Jerusalem, Emperor of Constantinople, c. 1175–1237.
- Sot, Michel; Lobrichon, Guy; Depardon, Marie-Hélène (2006). Les gestes des évêques d'Auxerre. Vol. 2. Belles lettres.
