= Yolande of Châtillon =

French nobility (1221–1254)

Yolande I, Countess of Nevers (died 1254), was the daughter of Guy II, Count of Saint-Pol and Agnès de Donzy. She was the heiress of her grandmother Matilda I, but died before her.

She married Archambaud IX of Bourbon (d. 1249) and had the following children:

- Matilda II, Countess of Nevers (d. 1262)
- Agnes, Lady of Bourbon (1237 - 7 September 1288)

She died in 1254.
