= Forézien =

Forézien may refer to:

- the people of Forez
- a dialect of the Franco-Provençal language
