= Eustache le Peintre de Reims =

Eustache le Peintre de Reims or Eustache de Rains (fl. 1225–40) was a trouvère from Reims, possibly a painter (peintre), but that may just be a family name. Seven poems of his are preserved in surviving chansonniers.

Eustache addressed one of his songs, "Amours, coment porroie chancon faire", to Guigues IV, Count of Forez and Nevers. Guigues participated in the Barons' Crusade of Theobald I of Navarre in 1239 and died in 1241; Eustache's poem was probably written during this time.

All of Eustache's poems are in isometric decasyllables; stanzas are usually eight lines in length with two rhymes. His melodies are simple, and recorded in bar form. He must have participated in puys, for his "Force d'Amours me destraint et mestroie" is labelled a chanson couronnée (crowned, i.e. prized, song) in one of the manuscripts.

== Works ==
- "Amours, coment porroie chancon faire"
- "Chanter me fait pour mes maus alegier"
- "Cil qui chantent de flour ne verdure"
- "Ferm et entier, sans fauser et sans faindre"
- "Force d'Amours me destraint et mestroie"
- "Nient plus que droiz puet estre sans raison"
- "Tant est Amours puissans que que nus die"
