= Gesta Ludovici VIII =

Gesta Ludovici VIII or Gesta Ludovici octavi (Deeds of Louis VIII) may refer to:

- an epic poem by Nicholas of Bray (composed in 1228–1249)
- a prose compilation (late 13th century), part of a series of royal histories produced at the Abbey of Saint-Denis
