= Château de Druyes =

Medieval castle in Yonne, France

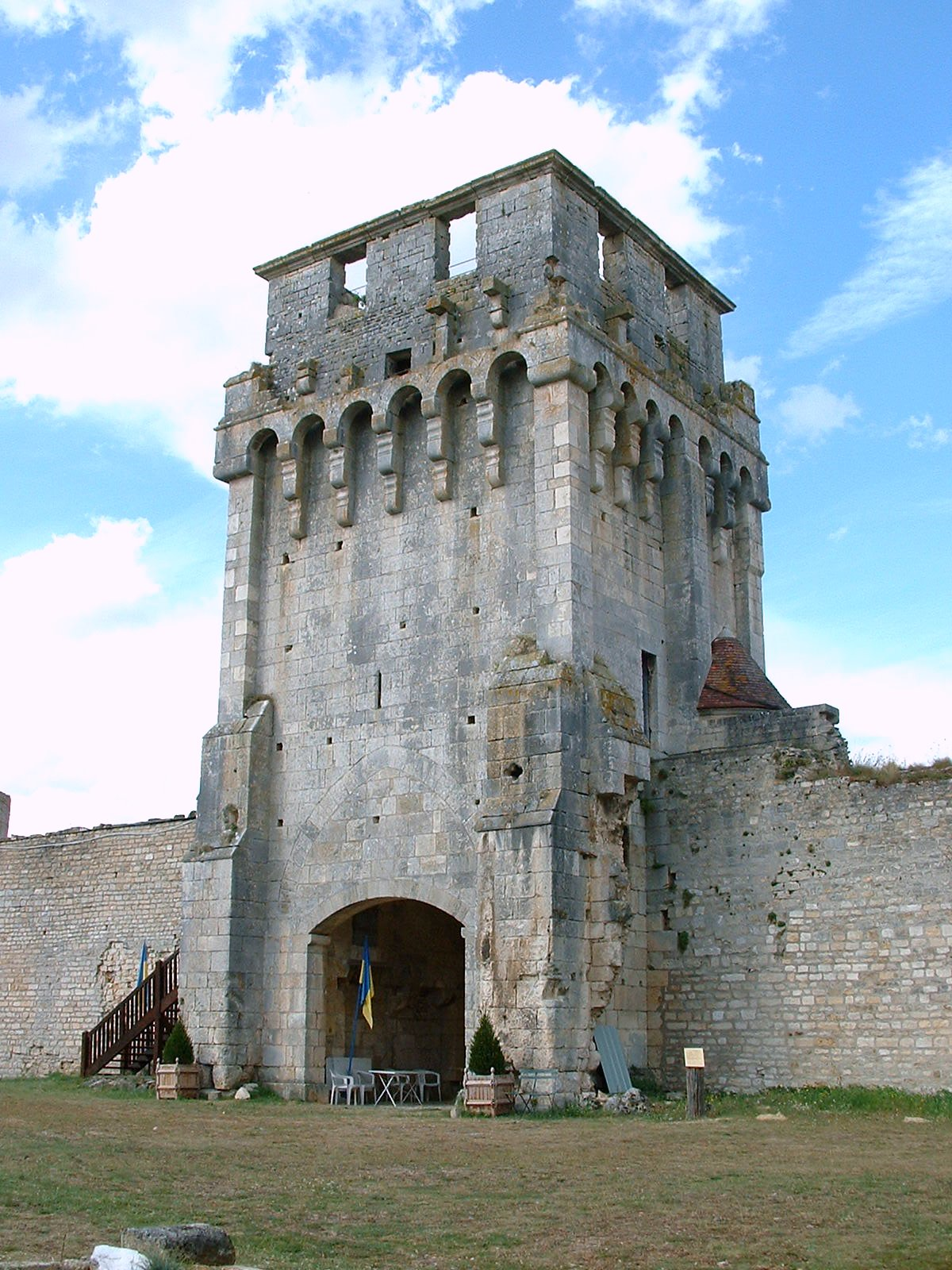
- The château de Druyes gatehouse (interior view)

- Location within France
- 47°32′55″N 3°25′22″E

History
- Built: 12th century
- Original use: Castle and noble residence

Site notes
- Architectural style: Middle ages
- Current use: Tourist attraction
- Owner: Private property
- Website: http://chateau-de-druyes.com/ (in French)

Monument historique
- Designated: 1924

Château de Druyes (French pronunciation: [ʃato də dʁɥi]) is a medieval castle located in Druyes-les-Belles-Fontaines in Yonne, Bourgogne-Franche-Comté. It was built in the 12th century by the Counts of Nevers, and remained in their possession until the 18th century. It was as much a noble residence as it was a fortified castle. It was a frequented dwelling place of Peter II of Courtenay, the Emperor of Constantinople in the 13th century, and his daughter Matilda, Countess of Nevers, Auxerre and Tonnerre.

It was later abandoned by the Counts of Nevers. From the 17th century onward, having lost all military and stately importance, it was no longer occupied and slowly deteriorated. The castle avoided destruction during the French Revolution but it was not until the second half of the 20th century that local residents and authorities became concerned about its fate and made efforts to save it from total ruin.

Druyes is part of the first generation of Philippians castles. These castles were built in the time of King Philip Augustus and displayed a simple plan and circular towers. It is built on a square plan of 52 meters wide. The corners are defended by four round towers. Three of the four curtains have a square tower. The north tower is the highest and acts as a fortified entrance gate. A large house, now gone, was located along on the south curtain wall and had Romanesque arched openings.

== History ==
=== A village established ===
While there is no record of the activity at this site during Roman times, it is known that a Roman road passed by. Decades after the fall of the Roman Empire, about 543, a monastery was created and a nearby village grew and Druyes is cited as a parish of Auxerre in 596, under the name of "Drogia". Being close to the Druyes River made the village difficult to defend against invaders. During the time of the Norman invasions of the 9th century, the village was relocated to a more elevated and defensible rocky plateau nearby.

At the death of Richard, Duke of Burgundy, the vast territory that he had acquired (including Auxerre and Druyes) was divided. His land to the north, Auxerre and Sens, Hugh the great, duke of the Franks, and subsequently to his sons Otto and Henry in 954. After Henry died in 1002 and his son, Otto-William, was then forced to fight a legal battle against Henry's nephew, the King of France Robert the Pious for control of Burgundy. King Robert succeeded, however the Count of Nevers took advantage of the period of uncertainty to establish his authority over part of Auxerre, in particular Saint-Sauveur and Druyes. This included the site of the Château de Druyes.

From 1032, the counties of Nevers and Auxerre were under the control of Renaud, the Count of Nevers. Druyes, including the site of the Château de Druyes, became a unique location, where the feudal power that extended over the rest of Auxerre (i.e. the bishop of Auxerre) did not apply.

=== The castle is built and occupied by nobility ===
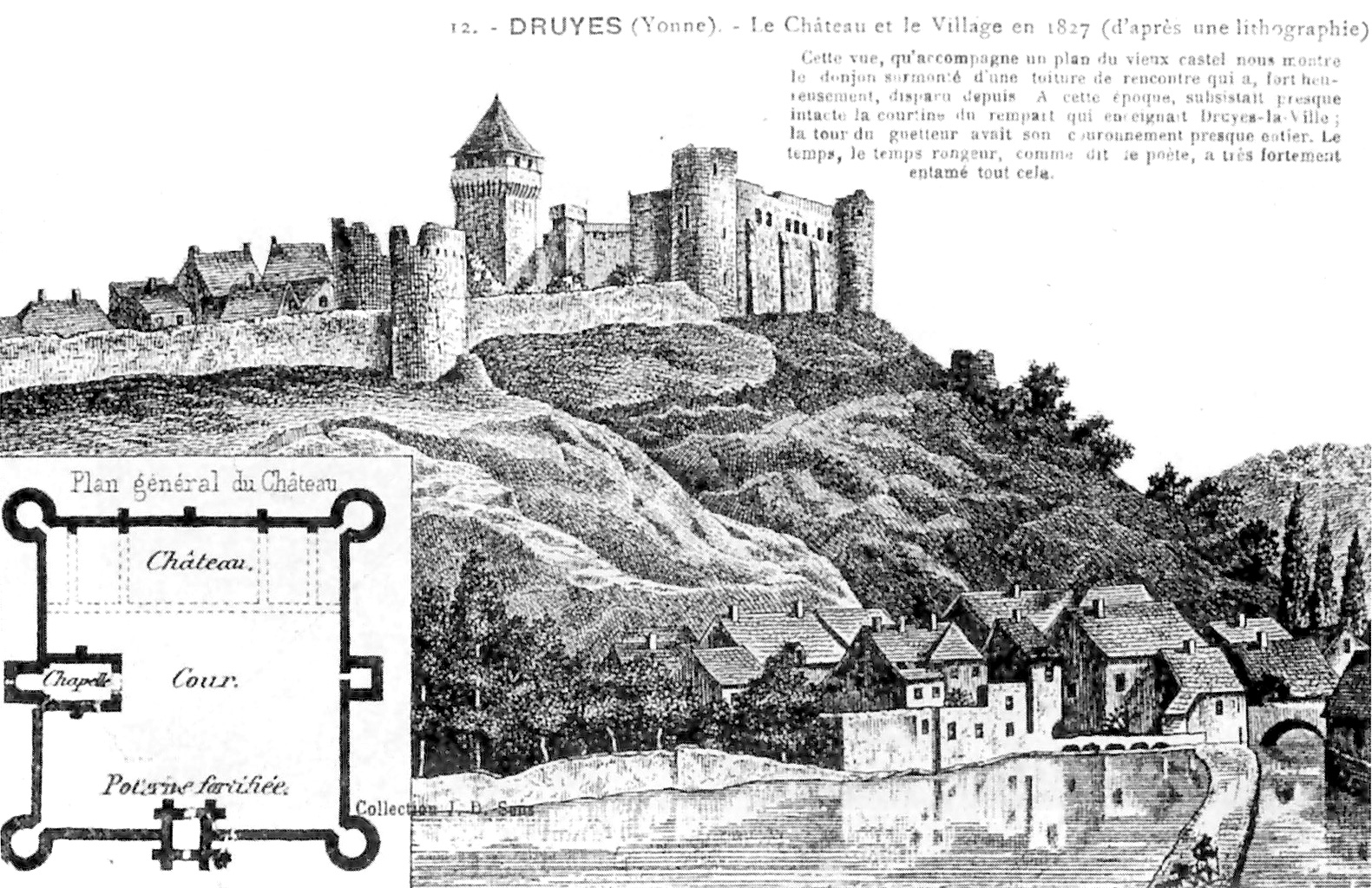
The Château de Druyes overlooks the elevated town, drawn in 1827

It was not until the late 12th century when the Château de Druyes began to appear in writings, however the architect and the exact date of construction are not known. At this time the castle became a common residence of Peter II of Courtenay, cousin to King Philip II by marriage.

In 1199, Peter II faced the revolt of a vassal, Hervé IV of Donzy. Peter was defeated and taken prisoner. To regain his freedom, he was forced to give Hervé the county of Nevers as well as his daughter's hand in marriage (Matilda of Courtenay). It was agreed that the counties of Auxerre and Tonnerre would become the property of Hervé at the death of Peter II.

In 1216, at his son-in-law's home in Druyes, Peter II received a delegation of barons who had come to offer him the crown of the Latin Empire of Constantinople. He accepted and was crowned in Rome April 9, 1217. His reign, however, was short lived. He was ambushed by the Greeks in Albania and died in prison during the winter of 1218–1219, having never reached Constantinople.

Pursuant to the agreement between Peter II and Hervé, Matilda of Courtenay, Countess of Nevers, inherited the counties of Auxerre and Tonnerre. The Countess was very popular because of her generosity, and she came regularly to stay at the Château de Druyes. During her stay in 1223 she signed a charter, which granted special freedoms to the people of Auxerre.

In 1255 in Druyes, Matilda received homage from the Bishop of Autun. At her death in 1257, her great-granddaughter Matilda II de Bourbon became the new Countess of Nevers, Auxerre and Tonnerre.

Matilda II died five years later, in 1262, and her husband Odo, Count of Nevers divided the three counties between her daughters Yolande, Margaret and Adelaide. Four years later, Odo is killed during a crusade. The estate was disputed, but a decree of parliament confirmed the division and sharing as per Odo's wishes. Yolande thus inherited the county of Nevers.

=== The castle becomes a garrison ===
After the death of Yolande, Nevers passed to her descendants and heirs, the counts of Flanders who abandoned the Château de Druyes. Consequently, Druyes lost its status as a royal residence and the castle deteriorated and was poorly maintained. The castle became home only to the captain and garrison responsible for its defence, but its military role remained important and it is likely that it was affected by the ravages of the Hundred Years' War. Between 1378 and 1384, the castle was repaired and its defences were strengthened.

Over the centuries, the county of Nevers (including the Château de Druyes) passed through the hands of various rulers. The Château de Druyes became a part of the short lived Kingdom of Burgundy, which ended in 1477 with the death of Charles the Bold. Throughout the 16th century the house of Cleves controlled this region. In the mid-17th century, Charles II Gonzaga inherited the territory, but suffered financial problems and he eventually sold the counties of Rethel and Nevers to Cardinal Mazarin in 1659. Mazarin raised the County of Nevers as a duchy-peerage and offered his nephew, Philippe Mancini, the title of Duke of Nevers.

=== Period of abandonment ===
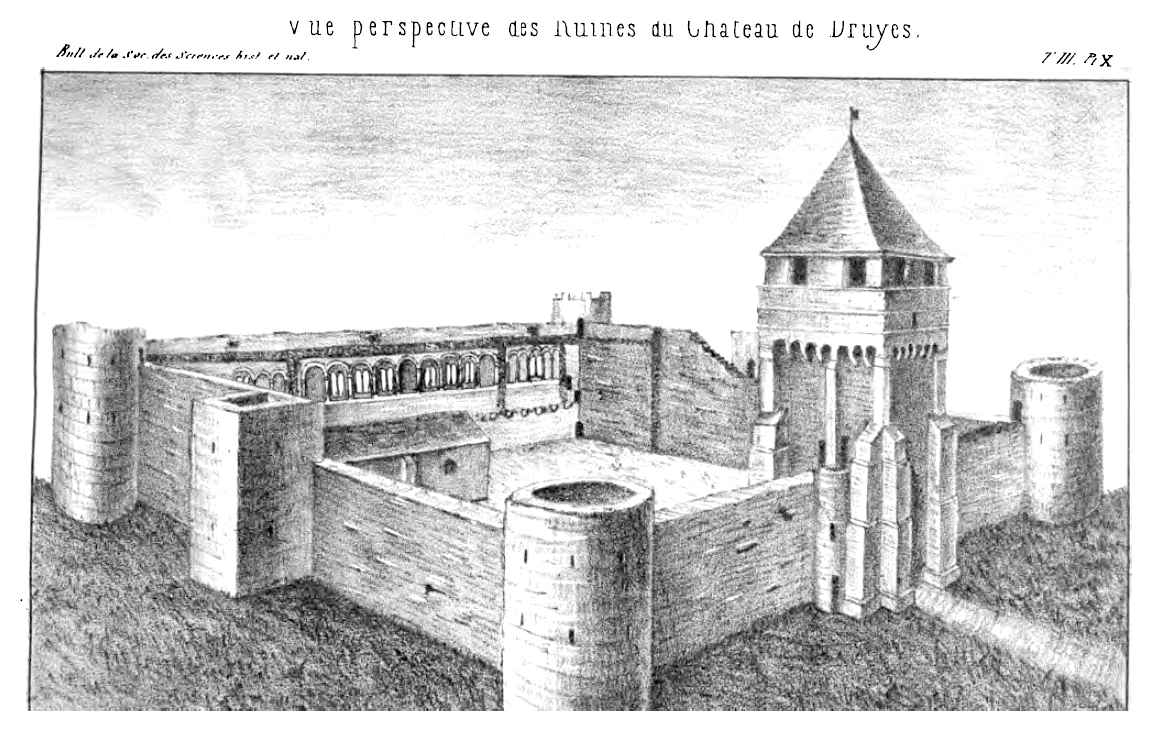
Drawing of the château in the 16th century by F. Vachey

The third and last Duke of Nevers, Louis Jules Mancini Mazarini sold the Château de Druyes to Louis Damas, Marquis of Anlezy, in 1738. The Damas family built a modern residence nearby at the end of the 16th century. The last marquis, François Damas invested heavily to beautify the modern house, the park and gardens. He died in debt. In 1792, the entire estate of François Damas was then offered for sale to pay debts. In 1795, unable to find a buyer, the châteaux were sold in lots for demolition. The Château de Druyes and its neighbouring modern château (of the Damas family) were described as follows:

The modern castle was completely demolished, while its neighbor escaped this fate, perhaps because of the height of the walls and the difficulty to demolish them or due to the low profitability of the demolition. (translated into English)

The Château de Druyes became the property of the Tissier d'Entrains family and was later sold to Mr. Girard-Claudion in 1965, and to a Mr. Chastrusse in 1972.

=== Period of revitalisation ===
While the Château de Druyes escaped demolition, it nevertheless suffered three centuries of neglect and vandalism. Since 1958, the local population worked to attract attention and save the castle from ruin. Volunteers began to clear brush and accumulated rubble. Between 1960 and 1971, the group Rural Homes of Druyes organized pageants to bring life back to the castle.

In 1967, the owners undertook the work of rescue and restoration, in co-operation with the chief architect of monument historique. Thanks to the efforts of Friends of château de Druyes, the castle has been open to visitors since 1981 and has hosted several cultural events.

== Description ==
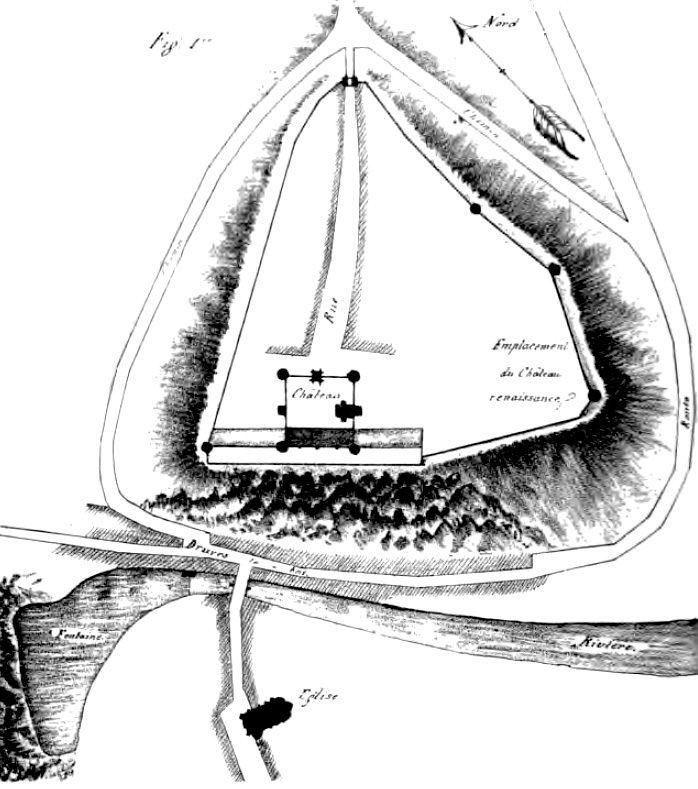
Plan of the town and the castle

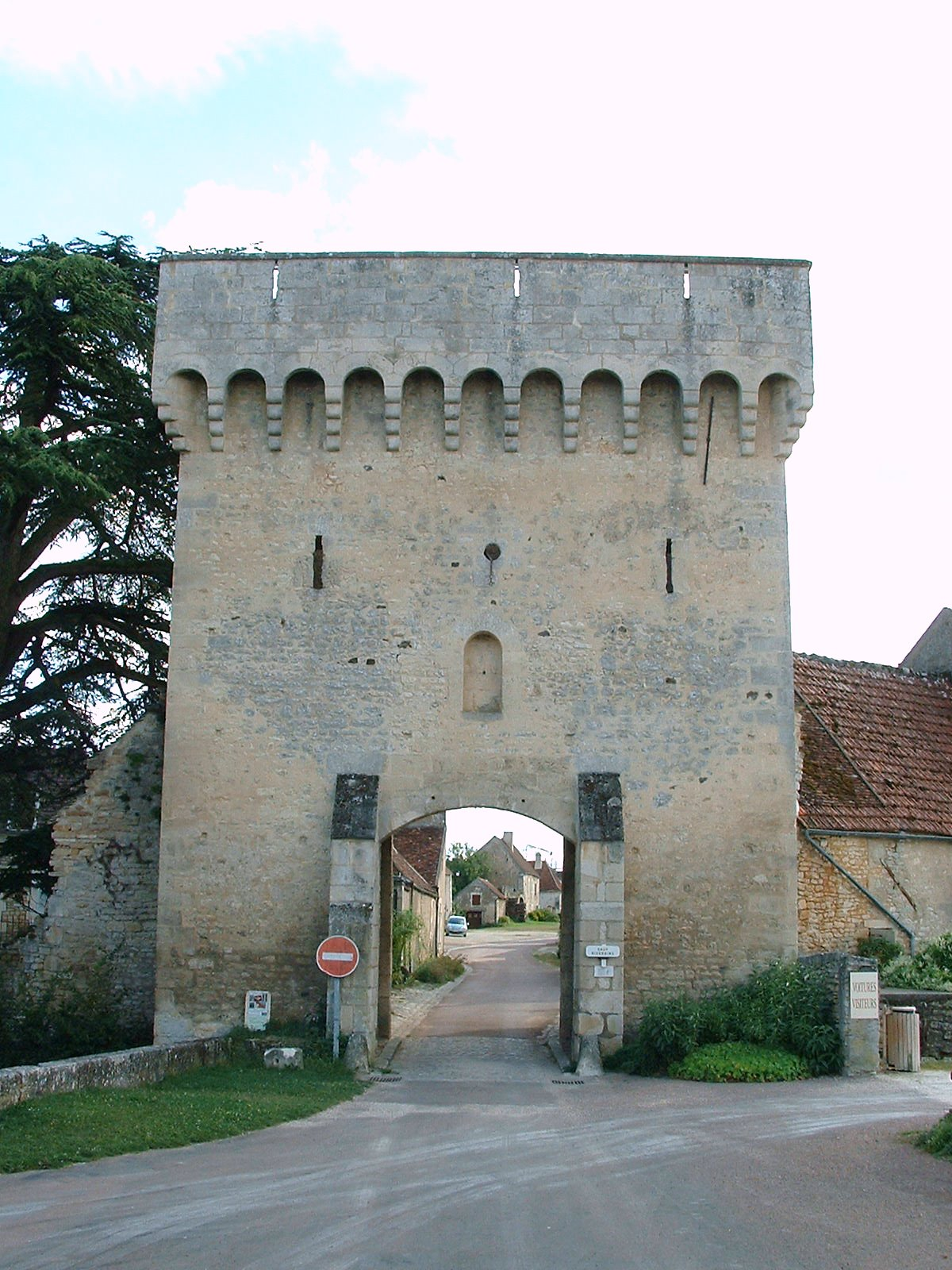
The postern (entry arch) to the town

=== The local geography and town ===
The castle and grounds are built on a high limestone plateau, with a defensive marsh valley dominating the surrounding countryside. On this triangular-shaped hill is a fortified village with towers and gateway, which was the main defense for the castle.

The top of the hill is flat and triangular, measuring about 300 meters wide, and surrounded by a wall. The town was typically accessed by a postern (secondary gate), located at the northern tip of the triangle, where the slope is more gentle. The plateau overlooks the valley and its shape made the castle practically impenetrable at the time it was built. The wall was defended by the towers (Bonnon tower or Jean Martin tower) with an outside ditch and a wooden palisade at the more vulnerable areas.

The entrance door, which suffered little damage over time, is topped with a terrace and a protective parapet battlement. Additions to the battlements were made to the entrance in the 14th century.

=== The fortification ===
Châteaux de Druyes is part of the first generation of Philippians castles, that is, castles built in the time of King Philip Augustus with a simple plan and circular towers that allowed a better defense at low cost.

It is built on a square plan of 52 m wide. The corners are defended by four round towers. Three of the four curtain walls have a square tower. The north tower is the highest and served as a gatehouse. A large residence, now gone, was located along the south curtain wall and had Romanesque arched openings.

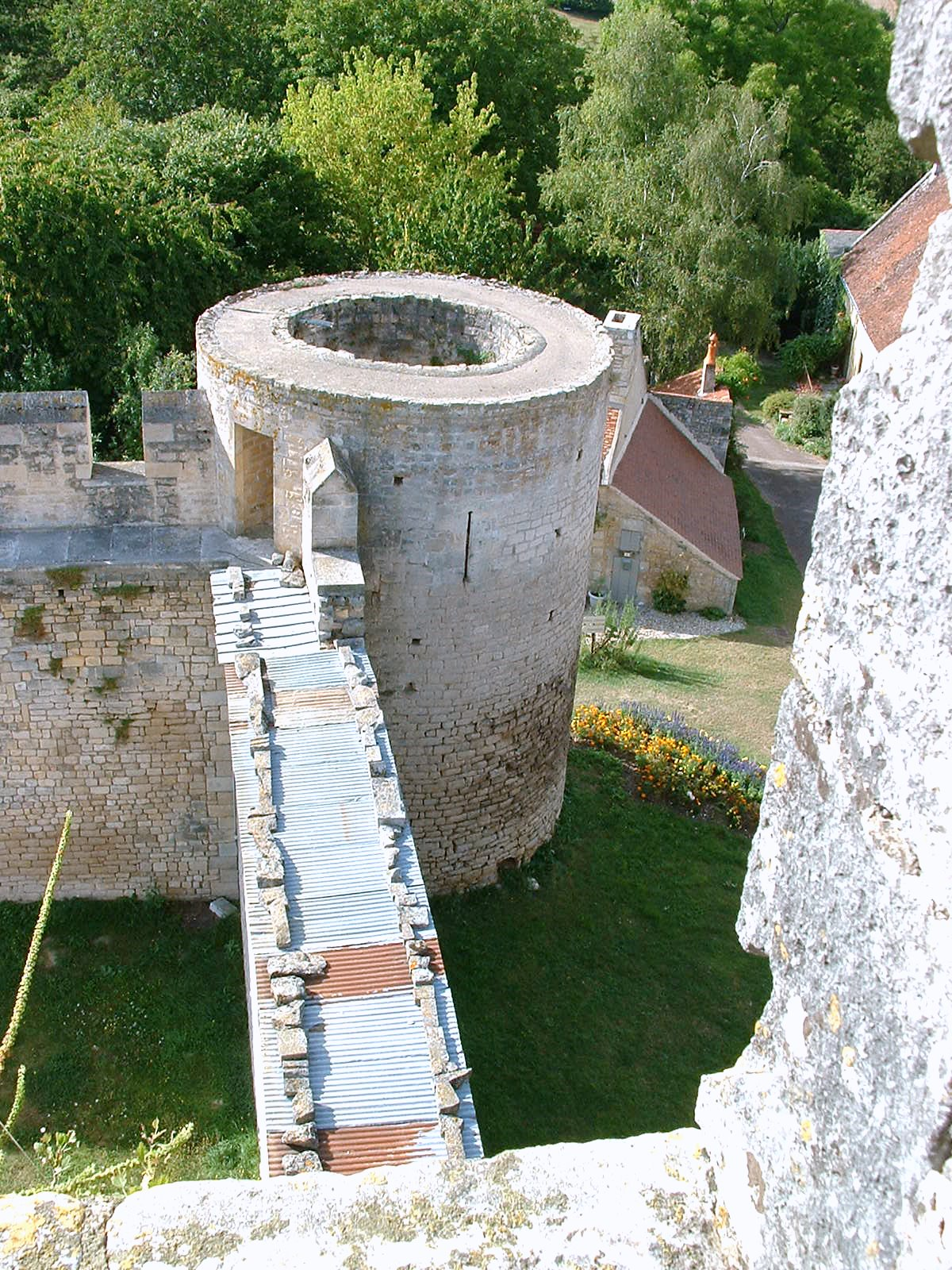
Curtain wall and north tower as seen from the gatehouse.

==== The curtain walls ====
The walls have a thickness of about 2 m and a height of 7 m, though the southern curtain that protected the house was 10 m high. There was a walkway on top of the walls that was protected by battlements, which allowed for movement as well as access to the ground from the four towers.

With the exception of the south curtain wall, that was defended by an important natural elevation, the other three walls have a square tower in the middle of their walls which reduced the flanking distance to 20 m, allowed the archers to crossfire and increased protection at the wall base.

==== The round towers ====
Round towers at the time of King Phillip were a major innovation in castle construction. A round tower required less stone than a square tower, was more resistant to blows and besieging and had no hidden angles in shooting.

At the Chateau de Druyes, the towers at each of the four corner lie mostly outside of the path of the wall, allowing a more effective visual scan of the base of walls and minimizing the threat of undermining.

The south towers that frame the house, named the Sault and Beauregard towers, are the highest at 15 m. These 6 m diameter towers were accessed through the court as well as through the first floor of the house. They were probably covered by a battlement-style terrace, and the domed roofs were later replaced with pepperpot-style roofs. One domed roof still remains in good condition.

The lower North towers were not accessible from the court, acting more as niches in the wall.

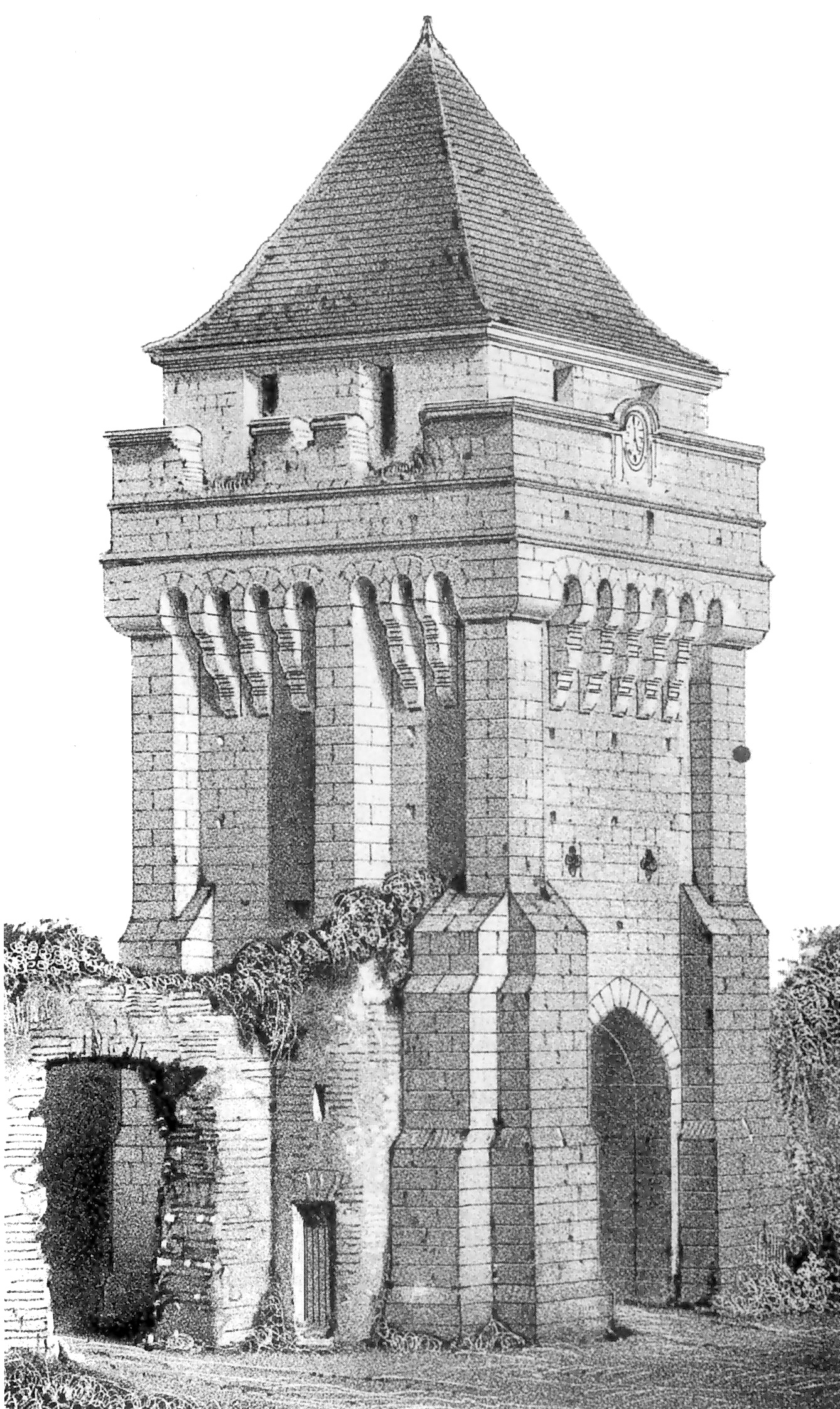
Lithography of the gatehouse by Victor Petit in 1861

==== The gatehouse ====
The gatehouse is a square tower and the tallest tower of the castle at 20 m. It was placed in the middle of the north curtain wall. It is the only gate of the enclosure and was protected by a wooden gate outside, and a double door from the inside. It was reinforced by buttresses whose lower part has been made more massive later. Unlike the rest of the castle, masonry was of good quality, medium-sized brick.

The gatehouse acted not only as an important defensive component of the keep, but also as a symbol of feudal power and stately residence.

The first floor was a command room: it controlled access to the parapets of the curtain wall with two doors, allowing it to operate the gate as well defended the passage under the porch with three murder-holes. Access from the courtyard was by ladders that were removed in case of siege in order to keep the tower relatively isolated. The second floor was accessed by an internal wooden staircase which housed the winch and the portcullis mechanism. A stone staircase built within the thickness of the wall leads to the terrace. The battlements were not installed until later, probably at the same time as the installation of the postern of the town.

In 1762, the battlements were replaced by a wall of large windows and covered with a Classical cornice and a hipped roof. Wishing to have a belfry, the villagers of Druyes obtained authorization of the Marquis of Anlezy to install a clock on the tower and a bell bearing the words: "I belong to the town of Druyes and I have been made at their expense." In 1797, the buyer of the castle wished to dismantle the bell, but was forced to flee after threats of the population.

==== The other towers ====
The square tower of the west curtain wall now stands at 12 m, but it was higher initially. It was accessed by a circular path through an arched entrance.

The other square tower facing it, housed the apse portion of the chapel, which was adorned with frescoes. The bay-style nave portion of the chapel was covered by an interrupted barrel vault extended into the courtyard. Two open windows in the tower lit the apse, but weakened the defenses of the structure. The columns, moldings and the capital are Romanesque style.

==== The residence ====
The stately home, now completely gone, was a large building of 49 m with 12 supports on the south curtain wall, facing the door to the gatehouse. Its foundations and walls were actually built tightly against the south curtain wall. Courtyards separated the other three walls from the residence.

The residence included a ground floor with service rooms and apartments, and a noble floor with a large framed ceremonial room with two smaller rooms. The first floor received light by a decorative set of stone windows called a "Romanesque gallery", which is still visible on the south curtain wall. It consists of a succession of semicircular arcs: some are blind, others surround Romanesque twin windows in columns.

The corbels (protruding stones) that supported the house beams are still visible and indicate the level of the second floor, which was well below the windows. The entire bottom of the walls therefore remained available for benches, furniture and tapestries.

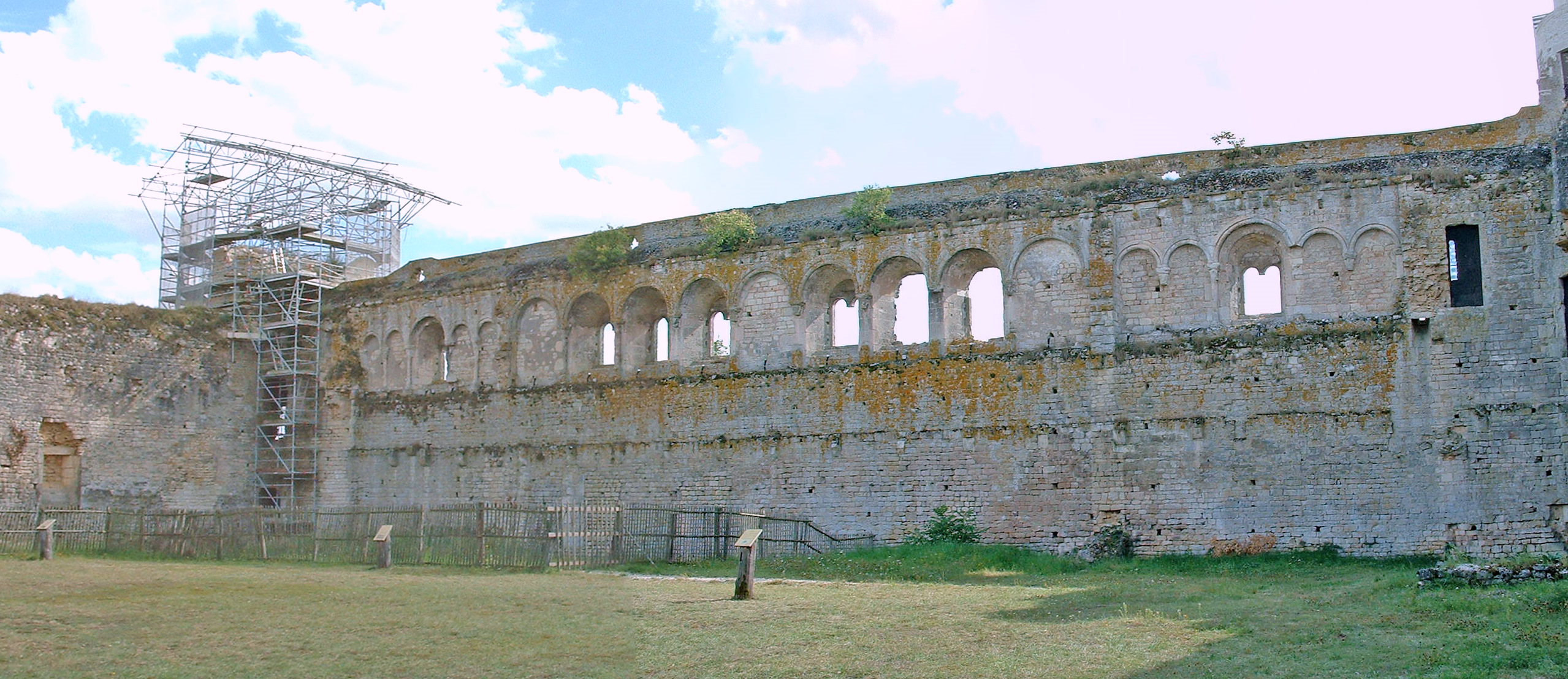
Decorative windows on the south wall and the lawn where the residence once stood

== Gallery ==
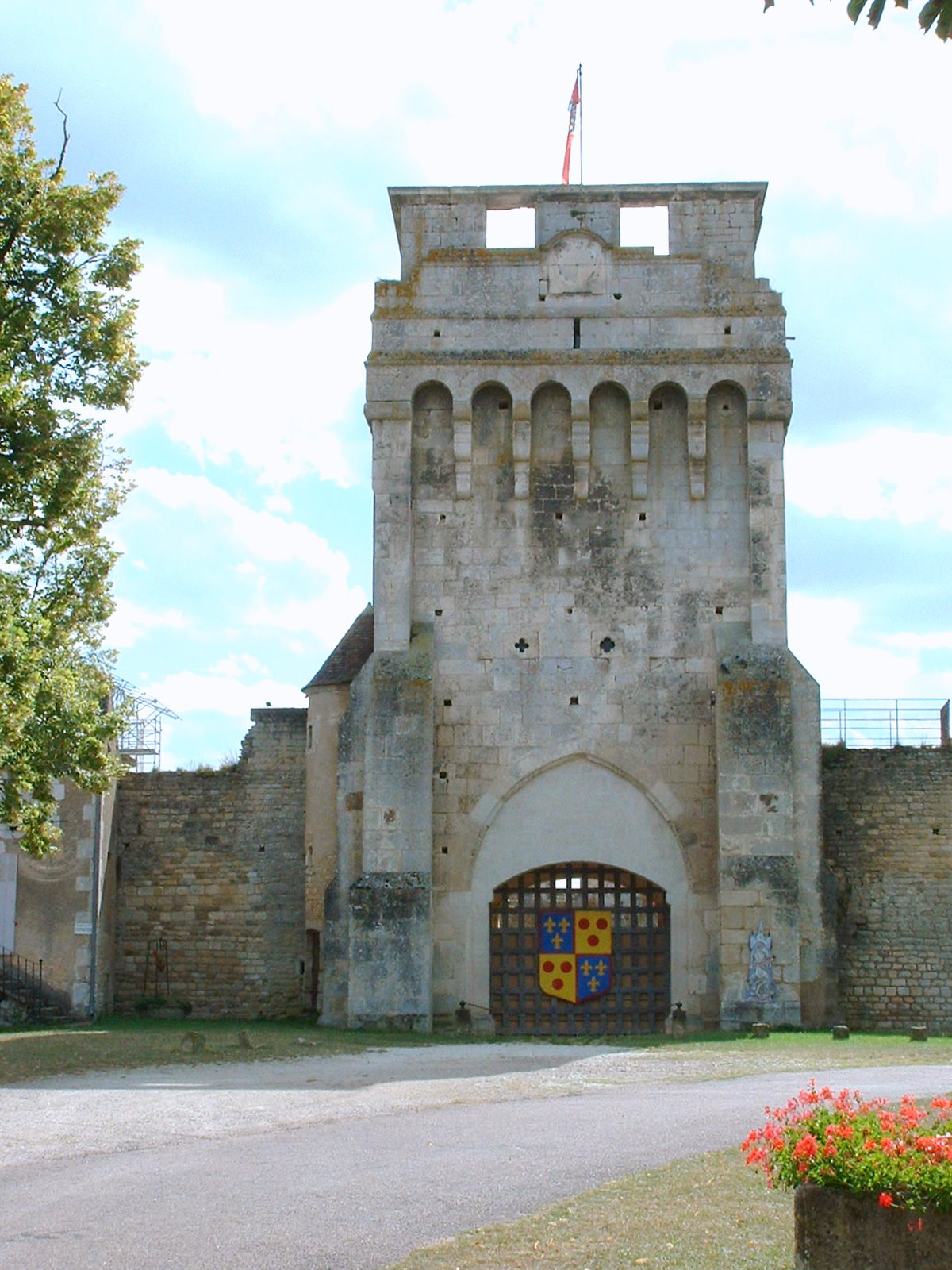
The exterior of the gatehouse

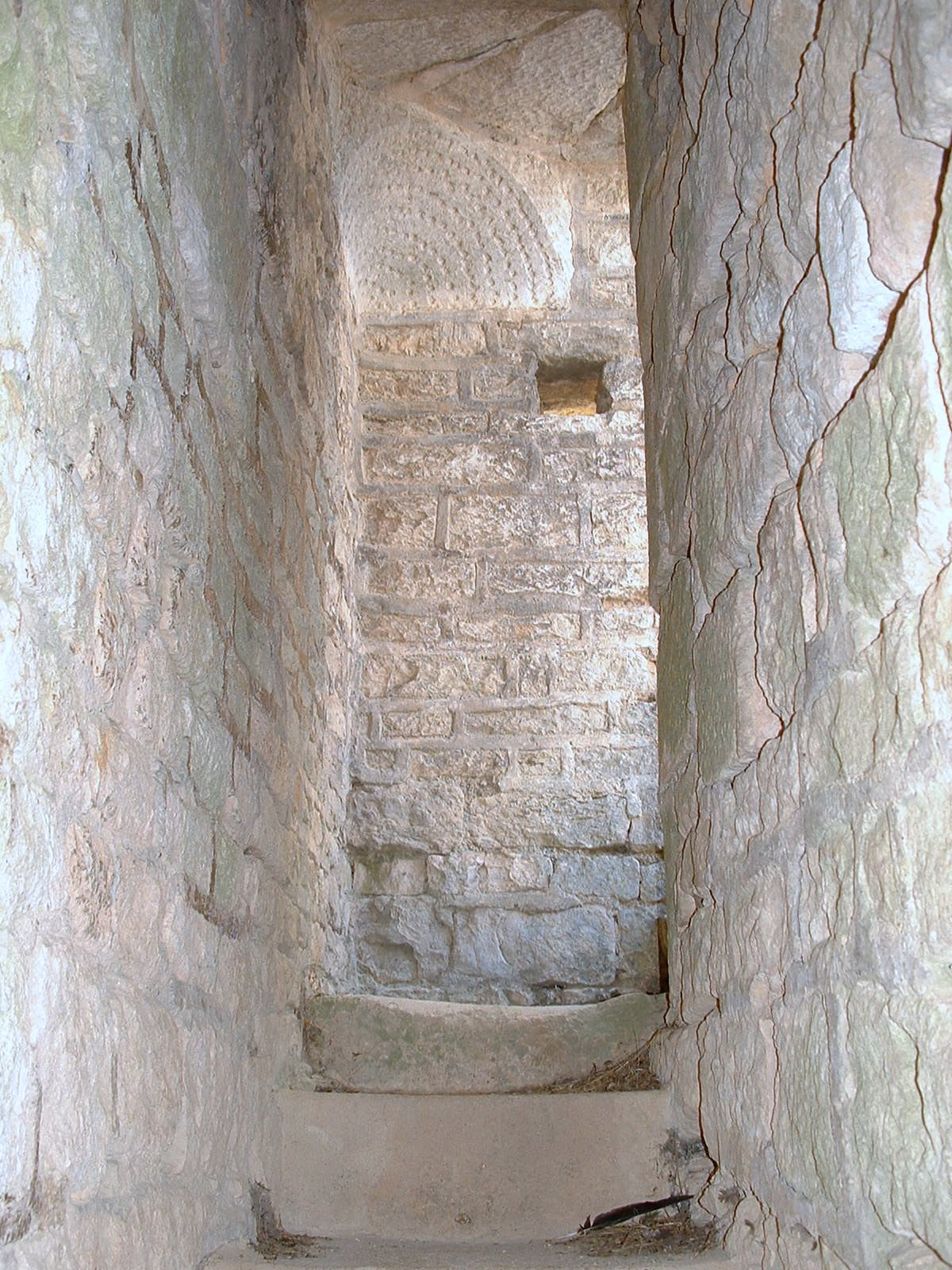
Stairs built into the tower walls

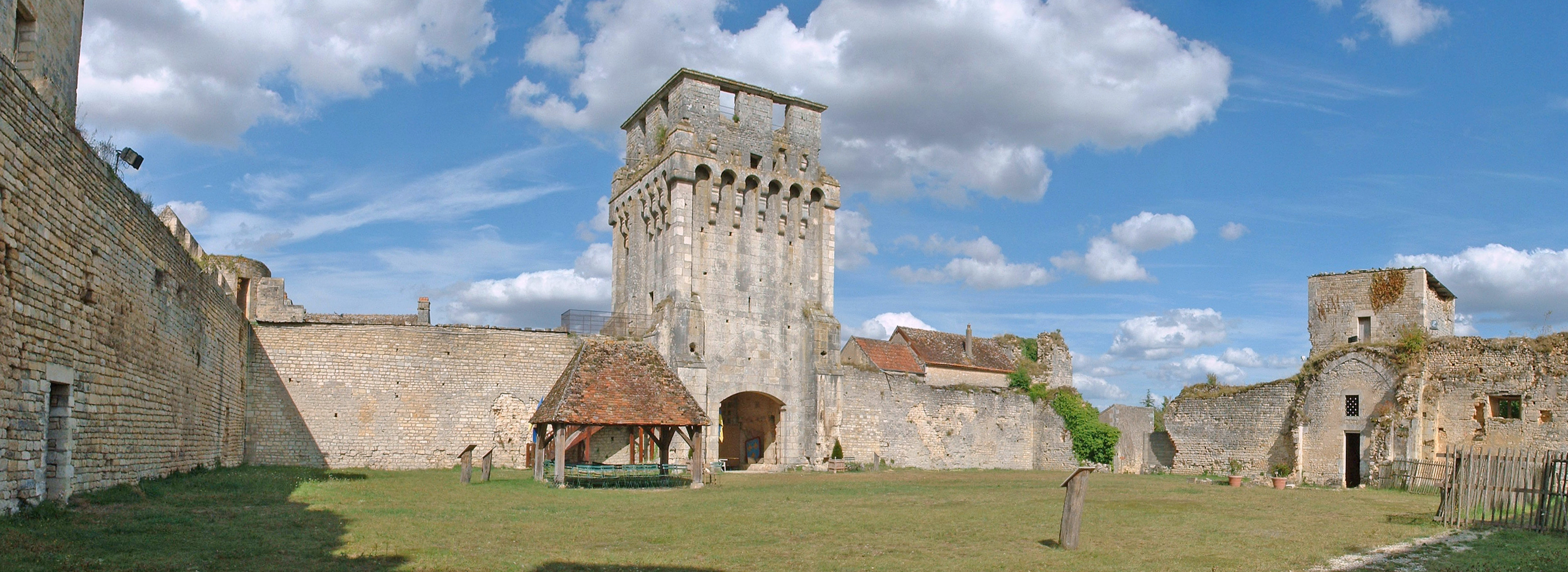
The north curtain wall and the square north tower

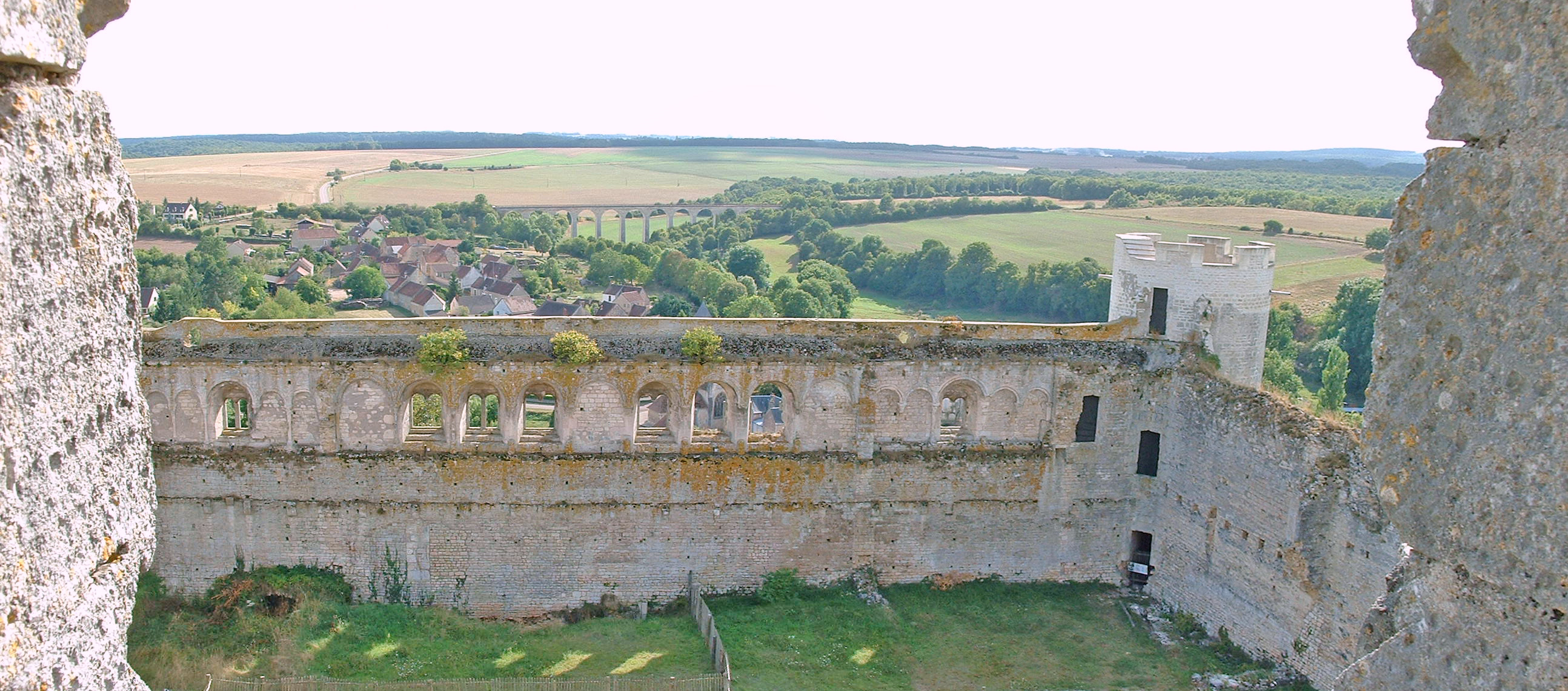
The south curtain as viewed from the tower

== See also ==
- Kingdom of Burgundy
- List of castles in France
