= Siege of Avignon (1226) =

Siege of Avignon by Louis VIII of France

- Part of the Albigensian Crusades
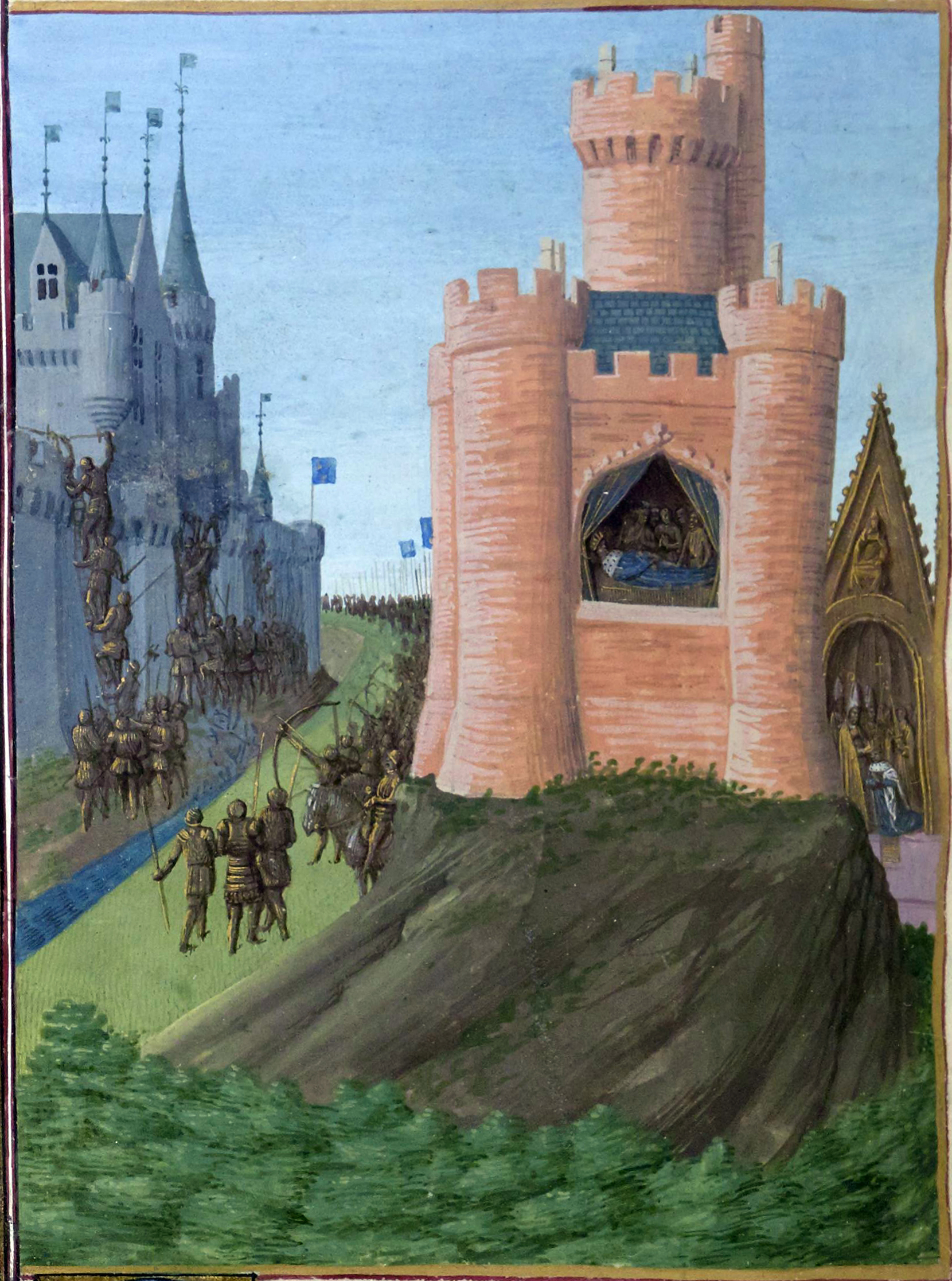
- Siege of Avignon (left) and death of Louis VIII (right). By Jean Fouquet, 15th century.
Date	10 June – 9 September 1226
Location	Avignon 43.95°N 4.8075°E
Result	French victory

Belligerents
France	Avignon

Commanders and leaders
Louis VIII	Consuls

The siege of Avignon was the principal military action of the Albigensian Crusade of 1226. King Louis VIII of France besieged the town of Avignon, which lay within the Holy Roman Empire, from 10 June until 9 September, when it surrendered on terms.

== Background ==
Louis VIII assembled the largest army of the Albigensian Crusades at Bourges in May 1226. He advanced to Lyon and then down the Rhône Valley on the left bank (the imperial side), his ultimate goal being the submission of Count Raymond VII of Toulouse, who as Marquis of Provence also held lordship over Avignon. The latter was an autonomous city, governed by a podestà and consuls on the Italian model. It was wealthy, possessing a full double wall with two large gate towers (named Quiquenparle and Quiquengrogne). Its defences were manned by mercenary soldiers. It had, however, been under an interdict for twelve years for having refused an order of the pope.

Louis's plan was to cross back into France at Avignon. Representatives of Avignon appeared at Bourges in order to reach an understanding with Louis and prevent any violence to their city. They agreed not to impede the travel of Louis's baggage down the Rhône, and to allow him to cross the stone bridge of Saint-Bénézet (completed in 1188) with a small retinue. Louis could thus enter the city, but the majority of the army would have to go around the walls and avoid the bridge. Count Raymond Berengar IV of Provence also came to an understanding with Louis to prevent any damage to his lands.

== Dispute between the king and the city ==
When Louis arrived at Sorgues six miles from the city, an Avignonese magistrate greeted him and ceded him the city of Beaucaire across the river from Avignon, which belonged to Raymond VII, but which the count had mortgaged to Avignon to finance his resistance. In exchange, Louis paid Raymond's debt. The Avignonese also asked for absolution from their excommunication and requested that the papal legate, Cardinal Romanus of Sant'Angelo, enter the city with the other bishops and Louis accompanied by only 100 knights to lift the ban and receive the oaths of the Avignonese. These terms were accepted and the magistrate left behind hostages as a guarantee of good faith. According to Philippe Mousket, the 50 hostages given by the city turned out to be poor men passed off as the sons of the bourgeoisie. At Sorgues, the crusading army was spread out over four miles of riverbank.

Louis reached Avignon on 7 June. At this point there seems to have been some confusion. To prevent the army from trying to use the stone bridge, the citizens built a wooden (possibly pontoon) bridge outside the city, which Louis's vanguard crossed without incident. The king, for reasons of prestige, refused to use it and demanded the fulfillment of the agreement. When the contingent under Lord Walter II of Avesnes reached the makeshift bridge, after having marched under the walls of the city with banners flying, it was attacked by a party from the city. Several crusaders were killed and several captured. The rest crossed the bridge to safety.

The reasons for the Avignonese attack are unknown, but all the French sources and the papal legate's report agree that the Avignonese were the instigators. According to one rumour popular at the time, the Avignonese intended to kill Louis and the papal legate while they were passing through the city. This, however, is inconsistent with the voluntary handing over of Beaucaire and may be dismissed as a mere rumour. The sole contemporary source to blame Louis for the break with Avignon is Roger of Wendover, who accuses the king of planning all along to attack the city.

When Louis demanded the city abide by its agreement, the consuls accused him of having violated it himself. It is possible that Walter of Avesnes's movements were mistaken for the preparation of an assault. Avignon blocked the Rhône and withheld the provisions that Louis had purchased without refunding him his money. The legate sent some Dominicans into Avignon to demand compliance with the agreement, but to no avail.

Louis VIII had no desire to fight at Avignon, but if the city had successfully defied him it would have emboldened his enemies. After further negotiations, the consuls agreed to allow Louis and a small party alone to enter and cross the stone bridge. When Louis sent a party to the gates, however, they were barred. On 9 June, in a letter to Avignon's suzerain, the Emperor Frederick II, the French barons cited this incident, as well as the city's failure to supply the agreed upon number of hostages of suitable rank, as justification for his siege. Louis swore not to pull up camp until the city had yielded, whereupon Romanus pronounced the citizens heretics and protectors of heretics.

== Siege ==
The siege began on 10 June. The walls were too strong to be assaulted, nor could the city be entirely cut off. Louis dug trenches facing the walls and connected his forces on both sides of the river with pontoon bridges. The siege train he had moved down the Rhône on barges contained petraries, including trebuchets, and the walls of Avignon were bombarded continuously on all sides to little effect. Louis's chief siege engineer, Amaury Copeau, was killed by a stone from the defenders, who also succeeded in burning some of his engines.

Louis was able, with patrols, to restrict Avignon's food supply sufficiently to cause shortages. He received some help from other Provençal cities, the traditional rivals of Avignon. Supporters of Raymond VII harried Louis's foragers and fought a scorched earth campaign, resulting in food shortages among the besiegers as well. Food had to be imported to the camp by river at a great cost. Poor nutrition and sanitation combined with the heat of summer produced disease in the camp, and even Louis may have fallen ill. Dysentery raged and Louis eventually had to order the bodies of the dead thrown into the river.

The morale of Louis's army sank, and there were accusations of treachery. It was probably owing to this mounting discontent that Louis launched an assault on the walls on 8 August. Count Guy II of Saint-Pol led the assault, but the attackers received heavy fire from the towers and were repulsed. Guy himself was killed by a stone. The Chronicle of Tours blames the failure of the assault on the treachery of Count Theobald IV of Champagne and Duke Peter I of Brittany. Theobald, who only arrived after the start of the siege, had relatives in Avignon and appears to have maintained contact with them during the siege. He and his men abandoned the siege after having served only the forty days required by feudal custom. He and Peter were known to be sympathetic to Raymond and the Avignonese, but Peter probably remained with the royal army until the end of the siege. He probably arrived even later than Theobald, since unlike the latter he did not sign the letter to Frederick II.

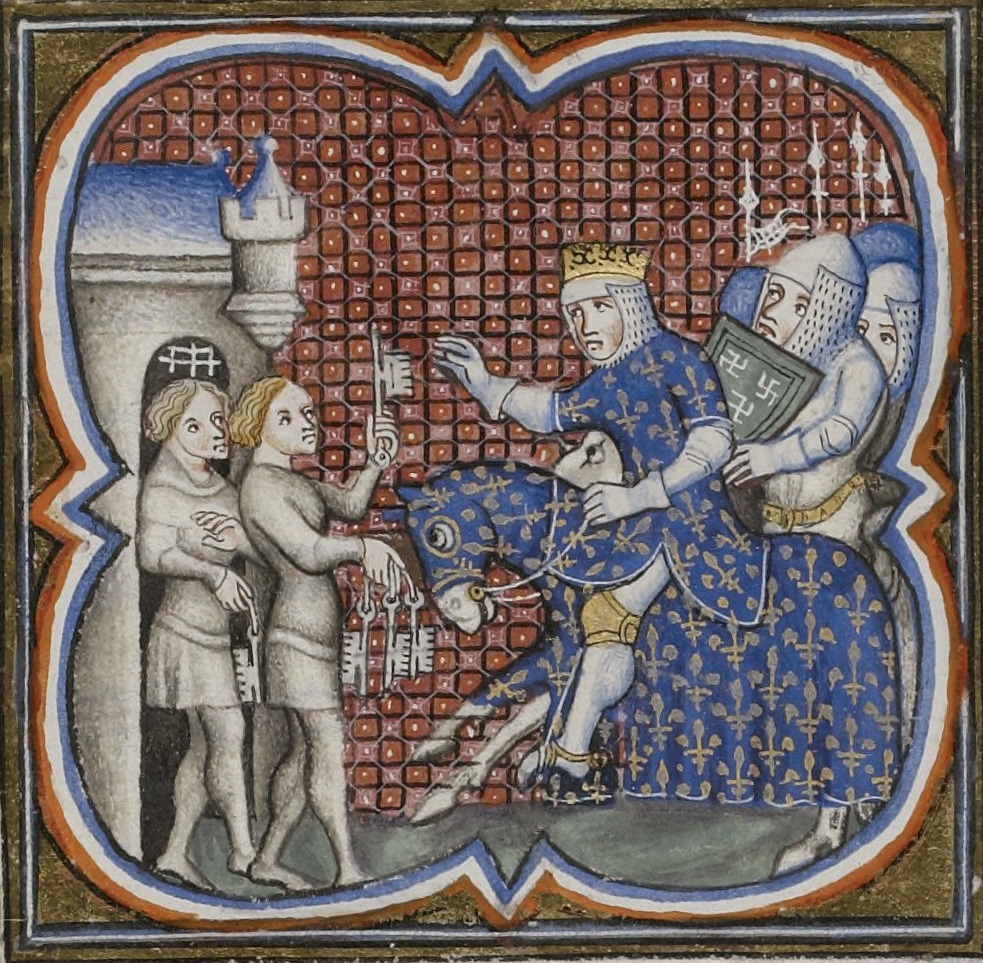
Louis accepting the surrender of Avignon

By late August both sides were eager for terms. It was the Avignonese who asked first. Louis readily entered negotiations because he wished to march against Raymond before winter. His timing was good. Two weeks after packing up camp, the site of encampment was flooded by the Durance. Louis died of dysentery, possibly contracted at the siege, in November.

== Surrender ==
The negotiations were prolonged and the terms agreed highly favourable to the French, although Avignon was spared from looting. The city agreed to pay Louis an indemnity of 6,000 marks (a rather small sum), to fund the construction of a royal fortress beside the abbey of Saint-André on the French side of the river and to cover the costs of sending 30 crusaders to Outremer, the last so as to expurgate the charge of heresy. Avignon's walls and towers were to be razed and all of its armaments, including its siege engines, were handed over to Louis. No citizens were to be punished and Louis promised no looting. The city gave 150 hostages for its good behaviour. On 9 September, the gates were opened and Louis entered the city without violence while Cardinal Romanus granted absolution to the citizens.

== In literature ==
Two Occitan troubadours, Tomier and Palaizi, wrote a sirventes on the eve of the siege, bemoaning the emperor's lack of action and criticizing the diversion of crusading from its proper goal, the recovery of the Holy Sepulchre. The troubadours also express hope that King Henry III of England would come to Avignon's aid, but they despair of any help from the young King James I of Aragon. Their refrain is "Let us be firm my lords, and let us count on powerful support":

And although Frederick, the ruler of Germany, tolerates Louis unpicking his empire, the king from beyond Brittany will be most upset by it. Let us be firm my lords, and let us count on powerful support.

They have withdrawn their help and support for the Holy Sepulchre, those who have diverted the crusade, and that is a crime towards faith. Those lying, absolved oafs shall never see Argence. Let us be firm my lords, and let us count on powerful support.

As for Avignon, it seems to me that it will never give in. We can all clearly see its noble prowess and all its deeds growing firmer every day. A curse on anyone that this displeases! Let us be firm my lords, and let us count on powerful support.

Nicholas of Bray wrote an epic in Latin on Louis's military accomplishments, chiefly the sieges of La Rochelle (1224) and Avignon. He was present at the latter. He offers a vivid eyewitness description of the assault led by the count of Saint-Pol:

Arrows are falling more heavily than rain, causing injury and death on all sides. Thousands of stones flying through the air cause similar carnage. One perishes under the stones, another falls, pierced through the side by an arrow; a third receives a leg wound. This man here has his brains scattered after his helmet has been broken; that man there, exhausted by the weight of his shield, can carry it no longer; another succumbs, burned by a substance made of fire and sulphur.

== Bibliography ==
- Choffel, Jacques [in French] (1983). Louis VIII le Lion: Roi de France méconnu, roi d'Angleterre ignoré. Paris: Fernand Lanore.
- Hanley, Catherine (2016). Louis: The French Prince Who Invaded England. Yale University Press.
- Jones, Chris (2007). Eclipse of Empire? Perceptions of the Western Empire and its Rulers in Late-Medieval France. Brepols.
- Léglu, Catherine; Rist, Rebecca; Taylor, Claire, eds. (2014). The Cathars and the Albigensian Crusade: A Sourcebook. Abingdon and New York: Routledge.
- Painter, Sidney (2019) [1937]. The Scourge of the Clergy: Peter of Dreux, Duke of Brittany. Johns Hopkins University Press. ISBN 9781421436586.
- Pegg, Mark Gregory (2008). A Most Holy War: The Albigensian Crusade and the Battle for Christendom. Oxford: Oxford University Press.
- Petit-Dutaillis, Charles [in French] (1895). Étude sur la vie et le règne de Louis VIII (1187–1226). Paris: Émile Bouillon.
- Sivéry, Gérard [in French] (1995). Louis VIII le lion. Paris: Fayard.
- Strayer, Joseph R. (1992) [1971]. The Albigensian Crusades. Ann Arbor: University of Michigan Press.
- Sumption, Jonathan (1978). The Albigensian Crusade. London: Faber and Faber.
