= Gerard of Forez =

Count of Forez and Lyon
- Reign: early 1000s - after 1046
- Predecessor: Artaud II of Forez
- Successor: Artaud III of Forez
- Died: after 1046
- Issue: Artaud; William
- House: House of Forez
- Father: Artaud II of Forez
- Mother: Théodeberge

Gerard of Forez (died after 1046) was a count of Lyon and Forez.

== Life ==
He was the son of Artaud I of Forez and Théodeberge. He is already cited as count in 1017.

He married a certain Adelaide, of unknown origin.

He is last cited in 1046.

== Issue ==
He and Adelaide had two children:

- Artaud III of Forez, who would later become count of Lyon and Forez;
- William.

French nobility
Preceded by Artaud II	Count of Forez and Lyon early 1000s – after 1046	Succeeded by Artaud III
