= Agnès II, Countess of Nevers =

French nobility (c. 1205–1225)

Agnes II of Nevers or Agnes II of Donzy, (born around 1205 and died in 1225), was Countess consort of Guy II of Saint-Pol from 1221 to 1225. On the death of her father (1222), her mother Mathilde de Courtenay assigned her the three counties for which she was responsible, Nevers, Auxerre and Tonnerre, from 1222 to 1225.

== Biography ==
Agnes was the daughter of Hervé IV, Baron of Donzy, and Mathilde de Courtenay. Her mother was the only child from the first marriage of Peter II of Courtenay and Countess Agnes I of Nevers, of whom she was the heiress. The marriage of Agnes de Donzy's parents was the consequence of a peace treaty: during a conflict, Hervé of Donzy took Peter II of Courtenay prisoner, and he had to grant Donzy the hand of his daughter and ceded him the county of Nevers.

== Marriages and descendants ==
Agnes became heiress to the counties of Nevers, Auxerre and Tonnerre after the death of her brother William (around 1207-1214). On 8 September 1217, she was married to young Philip of France, eldest son of the future Louis VIII of France and Blanche of Castile. With this union, King Philip II of France, grandfather of the young groom, hoped to attach the French counties of Nevers, Tonnerre and Auxerre to his crown. At that time, Agnes was twelve years old and Philip was eight, but the groom died after one year, in November 1218.

Agnes was remarried three years later in 1221 to Guy II of Saint-Pol (died in 1226). They had: (Note: According to Evergates, "His wife died shortly afterward, leaving two infants, Yoland and Gaucher.")

- Gaucher of Châtillon (died in 1250), married to Jeanne de Clermont
- Yolande of Châtillon (died in 1254), married to Archambaud IX of Bourbon

Agnes died some time after her husband was killed during the siege of Avignon in 1226. Their orphaned children were entrusted to their maternal grandmother, Mathilde de Courtenay, Countess of Nevers.

== Sources ==
- Baldwin, John W. (2002). Aristocratic Life in Medieval France: The Romances of Jean Renart and Gerbert de Montreuil, 1190-1230. Johns Hopkins University Press. ISBN 978-0-8018-6912-9.
- Berman, Constance H. (2018). The White Nuns: Cistercian Abbeys for Women in Medieval France. University of Pennsylvania Press.
- Bouchard, Constance Brittain (1987). Sword, Miter, and Cloister:Nobility and the Church in Burgundy, 980-1198. Cornell University Press.
- Bubenicek, Michelle (2002). Quand les femmes gouvernent: droit et politique au XIVe siècle:Yolande de Flandre, Droit et politique au XIV siecle (in French). Ecole des Chartes.
- Evergates, Theodore (2007). The Aristocracy in the County of Champagne, 1100-1300. University of Pennsylvania Press.
