= Hervé IV of Donzy =

French nobleman

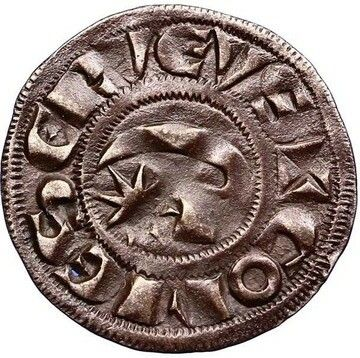
Coin of Hervé IV of Donzy as count of Nevers

Hervé IV of Donzy (1173– 22 January 1222) was a French nobleman and participant in the Fifth Crusade. By marriage in 1200 to Mahaut de Courtenay (1188–1257), daughter of Peter II of Courtenay, he became Count of Nevers.

In a dispute over the château de Gien with Peter of Courtenay, Hervé came to a settlement in 1199, having defeated and captured his overlord Peter at Cosne-sur-Loire. After Peter's death in 1219, he became Count of Auxerre and Tonnerre also; with Philip II, Marquis of Namur and Robert de Courtenay contesting Auxerre. He acquired Liernais also, in 1210.

Hervé and his countess were active in developing the Nivernais, his lands around Donzy adjoining the Nivernais and Burgundy. In 1209 they founded a Carthusian abbey at Bellary. He reconstructed the château Musard, Billy-sur-Oisy, around 1212–5. The priory at Beaulieu was founded in 1214.

In 1204–05 Hervé supported the French against the English in fighting in Normandy, Poitou and Touraine, and in 1209 would take part in the Albigensian Crusade. In 1214 he took part in the Battle of Bouvines, on the side of King John of England, later with John's intervention Hervé would obtain King Philip's pardon. In 1217 he would be involved in the French invasion of England.

His death, at Saint-Aignan, has been attributed to poisoning.

== Family ==
The daughter of Hervé and Mahaut,

- Agnès de Donzy (1205–1225), married in 1217 Philippe de France, eldest son of the future Louis VIII of France. Philippe died the following year. Agnès then married Count Guy II of Saint-Pol (died 1226). They had: Yolande I.

Following Hervé's death in 1222, Mahaut married Guigues IV of Forez in 1226.

== Sources ==
- Baldwin, John W. (2002). Aristocratic Life in Medieval France. Johns Hopkins University Press.
- Baldwin, John W. (1991). The Government of Philip Augustus: Foundations of French Royal Power in the Middle Ages. University of California Press.
- Bouchard, Constance Brittain (1987). Sword, Miter, and Cloister:Nobility and the Church in Burgundy, 980-1198. Cornell University Press.
- Branner, Robert (1961). Burgundian Gothic architecture, Volume 3. A. Zwemmer.
- Evergates, Theodore (2007). The Aristocracy in the County of Champagne, 1100-1300. University of Pennsylvania Press.
- Kupfer, Marcia (2003). The Art of Healing: Painting for the Sick and the Sinner in a Medieval Town. Pennsylvania State University Press.
- Marvin, Laurence W. (2008). The Occitan War: A Military and Political History of the Albigensian Crusade. Cambridge University Press.
- Perry, Guy (2013). John of Brienne: King of Jerusalem, Emperor of Constantinople, c.1175–1237.
- Pollock, M.A. (2015). Scotland, England and France After the Loss of Normandy, 1204-1296. The Boydell Press.
- Sot, Michel; Lobrichon, Guy; Depardon, Marie-Hélène (2006). Les gestes des évêques d'Auxerre: - Volume 2. Belles lettres.
