= Siege of La Rochelle (1224) =

French victory over the Plantagenets in France

Siege of La Rochelle, 1224
- Part of the Capetian–Angevin feuds
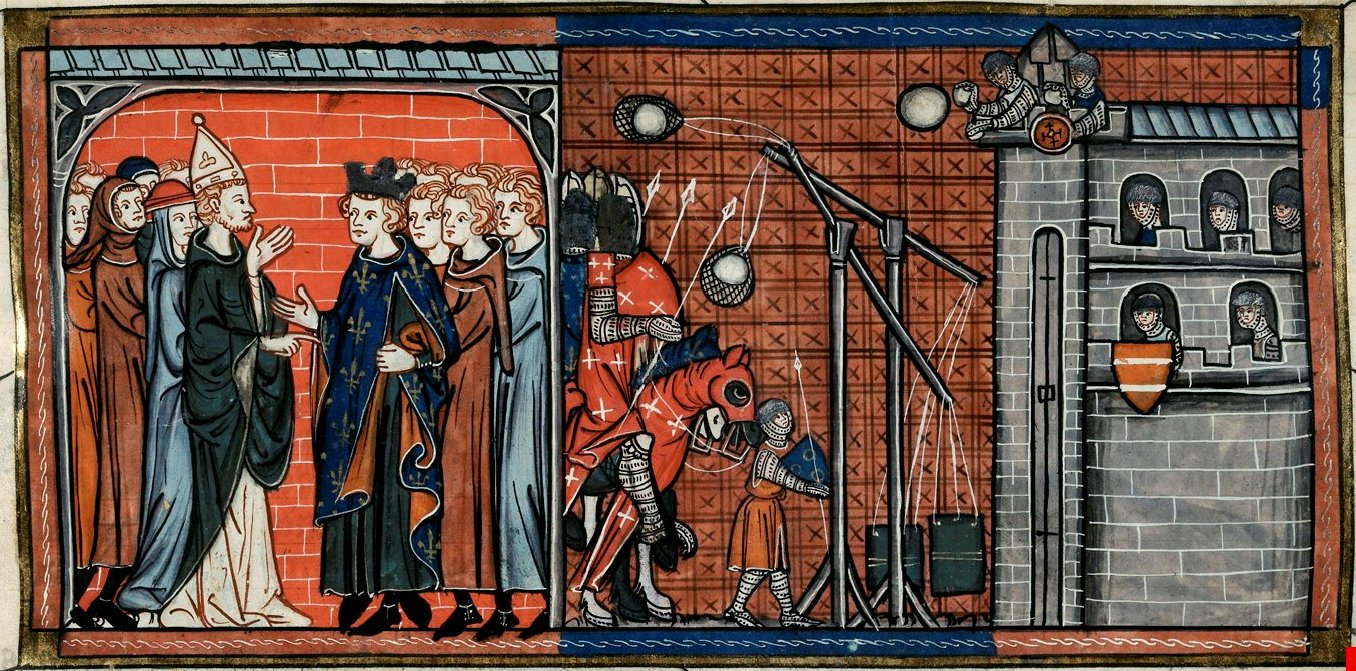
- Detail of a medieval miniature of the siege of La Rochelle.
Date	15 July – 3 August 1224
Location	La Rochelle, Poitou 46.1591°N 1.1517°W
Result	French victory
Territorial changes	La Rochelle absorbed into Capetian royal demesne

Belligerents
Kingdom of France	Duchy of Aquitaine; Kingdom of England

Commanders and leaders
Louis VIII	Savari de Mauléon; Geoffrey de Neuville

The siege of La Rochelle of 1224 was the decisive engagement in the campaign between the Capetians and the Plantagenets for control of Poitou. French royal forces commanded by Capetian king Louis VIII laid siege to the strategic port of La Rochelle and its garrison of Poitevin and English soldiers commanded by Savari de Mauléon. The port had long been a staging ground for Plantagenet efforts to regain their continental lands lost to the French crown since 1203. The siege lasted from July to August 1224, and resulted in La Rochelle's citizens surrendering the city to Louis after the failure of English relief to emerge. The siege of La Rochelle was the crowning event of the Capetian conquest of Poitou from the Plantagenets. With Poitou in Capetian hands, only Gascony remained under Plantagenet rule on the continent.

== Background ==
The city of La Rochelle came under Plantagenet rule with the rest of Aquitaine in 1152, when Eleanor of Aquitaine married Henry Plantagenet, the duke of Anjou and Normandy. Two years later, Henry had become king of England as Henry II; his lands, since labelled as the Angevin Empire and comprising much of western France, the kingdom of England and portions of Ireland, were passed on largely intact to his sons Richard I and John. In 1202, 1204 and 1207, John awarded tax privileges to La Rochelle, such as exempting the city from certain taxes, as well as from certain military obligations, and allowing it to tax anybody entering or leaving it.

The Capetians had been in frequent conflict with the Plantagenets since 1203, when Philip II declared John's continental lands forfeit over his marriage to Isabella of Angoulême. The French crown's conquest of Normandy, Anjou and parts of Aquitaine was followed by Philip's decisive victory at Bouvines in 1214 and the young Prince Louis' invasion of England during the First Barons' War of 1216–1217. By 1224, John's son and successor to the English throne Henry III was embroiled in internal war, successfully leading the Siege of Bedford in 1224. Henry was, however, financially strained and had considerably less resources than his French counterpart to successfully resist an attack on his remaining northern Aquitanian strongholds.

== Campaign and siege ==
Four days after the conclusion of the siege of Bedford, Louis VIII gathered his army at Tours, before moving to Montreuil-Bellay. According to Nicholas of Bray's Deeds of King Louis the Eighth, the French army included Bretons, Normans, Flemings and Champagnois. On 24 June 1224, at Tours, they heard a rousing speech from Duke Peter I of Brittany before setting out. Striking south, Louis quickly secured the smaller Poitevin towns, taking Niort on 5 July after a two-day confrontation with a garrison under the command of Savari de Mauléon. Savari's garrison managed to retreat to La Rochelle. After receiving the surrender of Saint-Jean-d'Angély, Louis finally laid siege to La Rochelle on 15 July. Defence of the city was commanded by Savari, whose forces were bolstered by a contingent of English troops under Geoffrey de Neuville that had arrived in June.

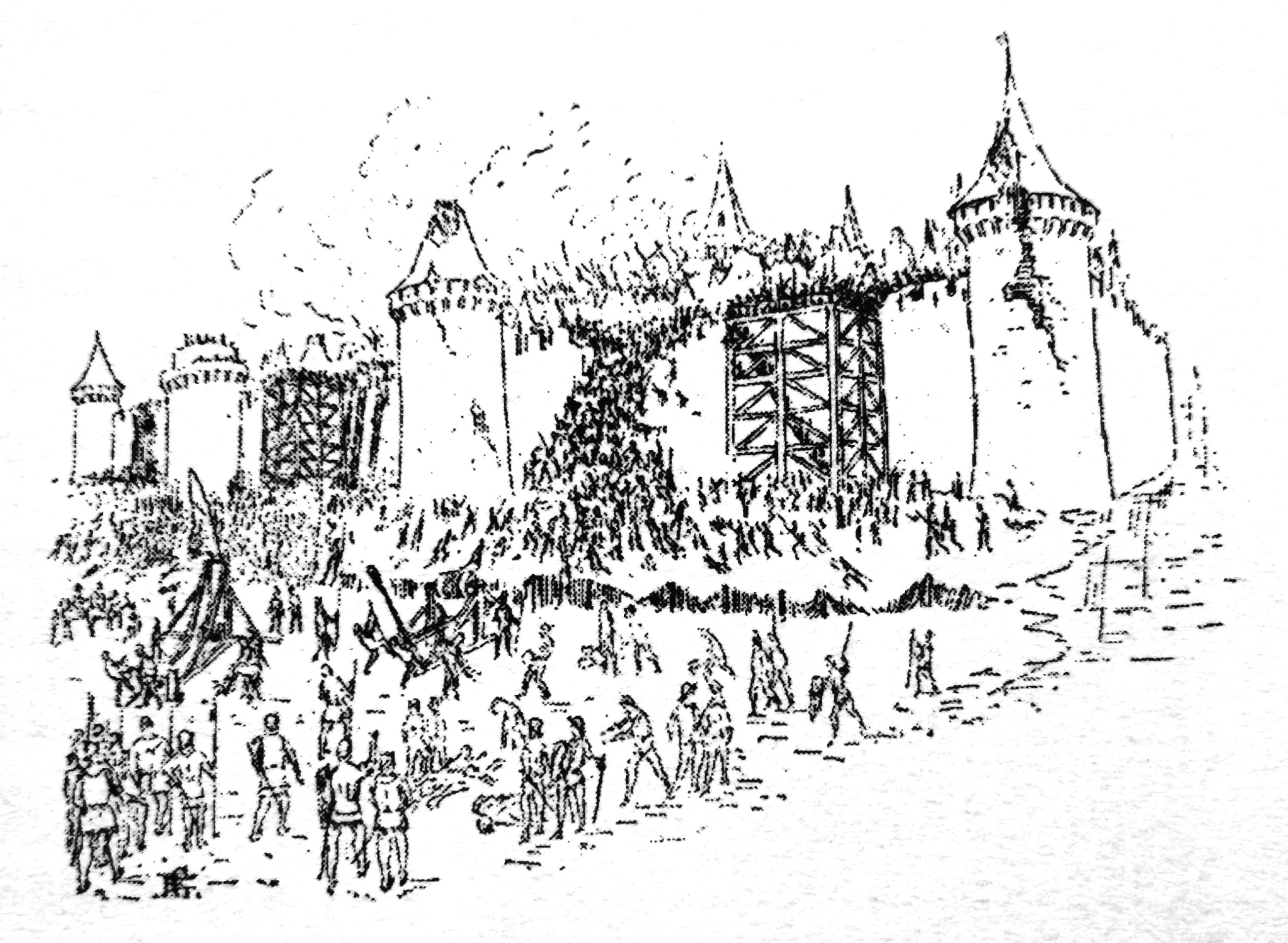
The siege as imagined by Emile Couneau, 1904

The exact nature of the end of the siege is ambiguous, though according to the chronicle of St. Martin of Tours, the city was surrendered on 3 August and French troops entered La Rochelle soon after. However, the burgesses of the city did not swear fealty to Louis until 13 August. Ralph of Coggeshall described the capitulation as a conditional surrender by the citizens, seemingly upon the realisation that only minimal support would be received from the English crown due to distractions from the aftermath of Bedford. The citizens had previously decided to surrender if English relief did not arrive by Christmas, but with French troops already in the city they accelerated their submission to Louis. Geoffrey's English force took no part in the surrender of the city; Louis allowed them to leave in peace with their arms. On the other hand, Savari's reputation amongst the English was tarnished by accusations of treachery; his efforts to try to explain the fall of La Rochelle to Henry having failed, Savari entered Louis' service by Christmas 1224. David Carpenter credits the fall of La Rochelle to the citizens, who "like those of the other towns, had simply lost the will to fight for the Angevin cause".

== Consequences ==
Following the 1224 siege, Louis VIII committed to maintain all the privileges of the city. Trade was encouraged by giving a safe conduct for all goods from or to the city, although usual taxes were applied. In case of a declaration of war between France and the country of a trader, that trader's goods were protected from being seized for a period of 20 days, during which the trader could leave the city with his goods unharmed.

The absorption of La Rochelle into the French royal demesne compromised the close trading relations the city had enjoyed with England and Ireland, especially in the export of wine. La Rochelle wine had been recorded in England since the end of the 12th century, and numerous English and Irish traders had been present in the city. The city compensated this loss by increased trade with the northern countries of Flanders. Until Bordeaux became the prominent harbour for wine, La Rochelle was the leading wine exporter on the Atlantic coast during the 13th and the 14th century. In exchange for the wine, cereals and cloth were imported from the Flanders, while tin was imported from Cornwall, and lead from Ireland.
