= Château de Montpensier =

Coordinates: 46.035°N 3.218°E

The Château de Montpensier is a former castle in the commune of Montpensier in the Puy-de-Dôme département of France.

== History ==
From the 11th century, Château de Montpensier was known as the fortress of Mons Pancherii (literally, Mont de la Panse, by reason of the shape of its motte). On 8 November 1226, King Louis VIII died there following a violent fever during his return from the Albigensian Crusade.

During the Hundred Years' War, the castle was still a strategic site that necessitated it being taken tower by tower by the English. Cardinal Richelieu ordered the destruction of the castle in 1633.

== See also ==
- List of castles in France

== Sources ==
- Chronique de Guillaume de Nangis/Règne de Louis VIII (Édition J.-L.-J. Brière, Paris, 1825)
- Louis Bréhier: L'Auvergne (1912)
- Orientation table at the butte de Montpensier.
