= Guy II of Saint-Pol =

Guy IV (c. 1197 – 1226) of the House of Châtillon was the de facto count of Saint-Pol as Guy II from 1219/1223 until his death.

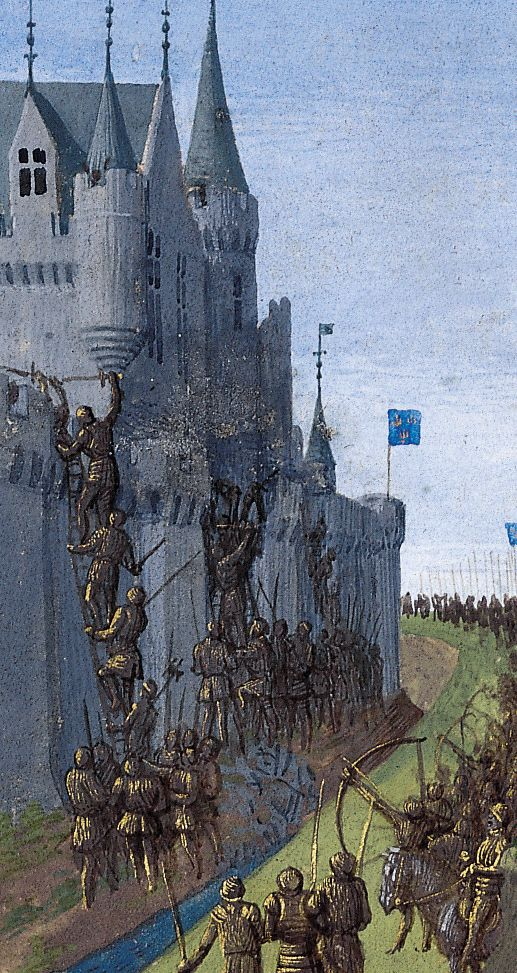
The assault on Avignon in which Guy died, from a 15th-century Grandes Chroniques de France illustrated by Jean Fouquet

== Life ==
Born around 1197, Guy was the eldest son of Walter III of Châtillon and Elizabeth, heiress of Saint-Pol. Upon his father's death in 1219, he inherited the castle of Montjay-la-Tour and the county of Saint-Pol, although his mother retained the right of residence for life. His younger brother, Hugh, inherited Châtillon, Crécy and the butlership of the county of Champagne. Guy and Hugh consented to their father placing his lands under the guardianship of Philip of Nanteuil, his executor.

In a sign of his father's wealth and prestige, Guy made a very advantageous marriage. In 1221, he married Agnès II, Countess of Nevers, daughter of Hervé IV of Donzy, who had been betrothed to Philip, eldest son of the future King Louis VIII, until his premature death in 1218. She was supposed to then marry the future Louis IX, but this marriage never took place. Her marriage to Guy was challenged as consanguineous, but the couple received a papal dispensation. Before the marriage, Guy and Hugh signed an agreement with King Philip II whereby they ceded him their joint lordship of Pont-Sainte-Maxence and he ceded them the right of redemption over Nevers, which had thitherto required a new count of Nevers to pay the king at his accession.

In 1223, Elizabeth ceded control of Saint-Pol to Guy, although the exact terms of this cession are unclear. She continued to be called countess while Guy preferred to call himself "son of the count of Saint-Pol". In 1224, he and his brother were forced by Count Theobald IV of Champagne to make all their castles renderable, that is, liable to be made available as needed to Theobald as their feudal lord. Guy attended Theobald's Christmas court in 1224. In Theobald's charter from this occasion, Guy is styled as count of Saint-Pol.

In August 1225, Guy made a donation of 10 livres tournois annually to the domus Dei (monastery) of Troissy for the construction of a chapel. This would eventually become the abbey of L'Amour-Dieu. Agnes died in 1225, possibly in childbirth. In 1226, Guy founded the Cistercian nunnery of Pont-aux-Dames for the sake of his soul and his late wife's. He donated an annual ten muids of wheat from the mills of Claye and ten livres from his lands at Montgé. This was, however, a whole new convent.

In 1226, Guy joined Theobald in the royal army on the Albigensian Crusade. At the siege of Avignon, he led the only major assault on the walls on 8 August and was killed by a stone. Louis VIII ordered his body taken to the priory of Longueau for burial.

== Marriage and issue ==
Guy and Agnes had two children:

- Yolande married Archambaud IX of Bourbon
- Walter

The county of Saint-Pol reverted to his mother, Elizabeth, who ceded it to Hugh. Walter inherited his mother's estates.

== Sources ==
- Baldwin, John W. (1986). The Government of Philip Augustus: Foundations of French Royal Power in the Middle Ages. University of California Press.
- Berman, Constance Hoffman (2018). The White Nuns: Cistercian Abbeys for Women in Medieval France. University of Pennsylvania Press.
- Evergates, Theodore (2007). The Aristocracy in the County of Champagne, 1100–1300. University of Pennsylvania Press.
- Lester, Anne E. (2011). Creating Cistercian Nuns: The Women's Religious Movement and Its Reform in Thirteenth-Century Champagne. Cornell University Press.
- Painter, Sidney (2019) [1937]. The Scourge of the Clergy: Peter of Dreux, Duke of Brittany. Johns Hopkins University Press.
- Nieus, Jean-François (2008). Les chartes des comtes de Saint-Pol (XIe–XIIIe siècles). Atelier de recherche sur les textes médiévaux. Vol. 11. Brepols. doi:10.1484/M.ARTEM-EB.5.105709. ISBN 978-2-503-52845-8.
- Nieus, Jean-François (2012). "Élisabeth Candavène, comtesse de Saint-Pol (†1240/47): une héritière face à la Couronne". In Éric Bousmar; Jonathan Dumont; Alain Marchandisse; Bertrand Schnerb (eds.). Femmes de pouvoir, femmes politiques durant les derniers siècles du Moyen Âge et au cours de la première Renaissance. De Boeck. pp. 185–211.
- Rosenberg, Samuel N., ed. (2022). Tales of a Minstrel of Reims in the Thirteenth Century. The Catholic University of America Press.
- Rouse, Richard; Rouse, Mary (2010). "French Literature and the Counts of Saint-Pol, ca. 1178–1377". Viator. 41 (1): 101–140. doi:10.1484/j.viator.1.100569.
- Sumption, Jonathan (1978). The Albigensian Crusade. Faber and Faber.
- Zezula, Jindrich (1976). "L'élément historique et la datation d'Anseÿs de Mes (ms. N)". Romania. 97 (385): 1–22. doi:10.3406/roma.1976.7188.
