= Nicholas of Bray =

French clergyman and poet

Nicholas of Bray (or Nicolas de Brai (Note: In French, his toponymic may also be spelled de Bray or de Braye. In Latin, he is Nicolaus (or Nicholaus) Braviacensis, Braiacensis or de Braia.)) was a French clergyman and poet who wrote a Latin epic on the deeds of King Louis VIII of France (1223–1226), the Gesta Ludovici VIII.

Nicholas is probably to be identified with the Nicholas who is recorded as the dean of the collegiate chapter in Bray-sur-Seine in 1202. He dedicated the Gesta to William of Auvergne, bishop of Paris (1228–1249). The only copy of the Gesta today is a copy made by André Duchesne in the 17th century.

The Gesta is 1,870 lines long, but is incomplete as it stands. It centres around the siege of La Rochelle in 1224 and the siege of Avignon in 1226. One line suggests that he was present at Avignon. Nicholas imitates Ovid's Metamorphoses, introducing thereby much classical mythology, but still contains some useful information for the historian. On the whole, the Gesta reveals more about mores and customs than historical events.

== Editions ==
- Nicolao de Braia, "Gesta Ludovici VIII, Francorum Regis", Recueil des historiens des Gaules et de la France (Paris: 1818 ), pp. 311–345.
