= Artaud IV of Forez =

Artaud III of Forez

Count of Forez and Lyon
- Reign: after 1046 - c. 1079
- Predecessor: Gerard of Forez
- Successor: William I of Forez
- Died: c. 1079
- Issue: William; Unnamed daughter
- House: House of Forez
- Father: Gerard of Forez
- Mother: Adelaide

Artaud III (or IV) of Forez (died c.1079) was a count of Lyon and Forez.

== Life ==
He was the son of Gerard of Forez and Adelaide.

He probably died around 1079, as a donation is made in his memory in that year.

== Issue ==
He had two children:

- William I of Forez, who would later become count of Lyon and Forez;
- An unnamed daughter, who married Renauld II, Count of Nevers.

French nobility
Preceded by Gerard	Count of Forez and Lyon after 1046 - c. 1079	Succeeded by William I
