= Forez =

Former province of France

Coordinates: 45°44′30″N 4°13′36″E

Coat of arms of Forez

Forez (Occitan: Forés, Forin; Arpitan: Forêz) is a former province of France, corresponding approximately to the central part of the modern Loire département and a part of the Haute-Loire and Puy-de-Dôme départements.

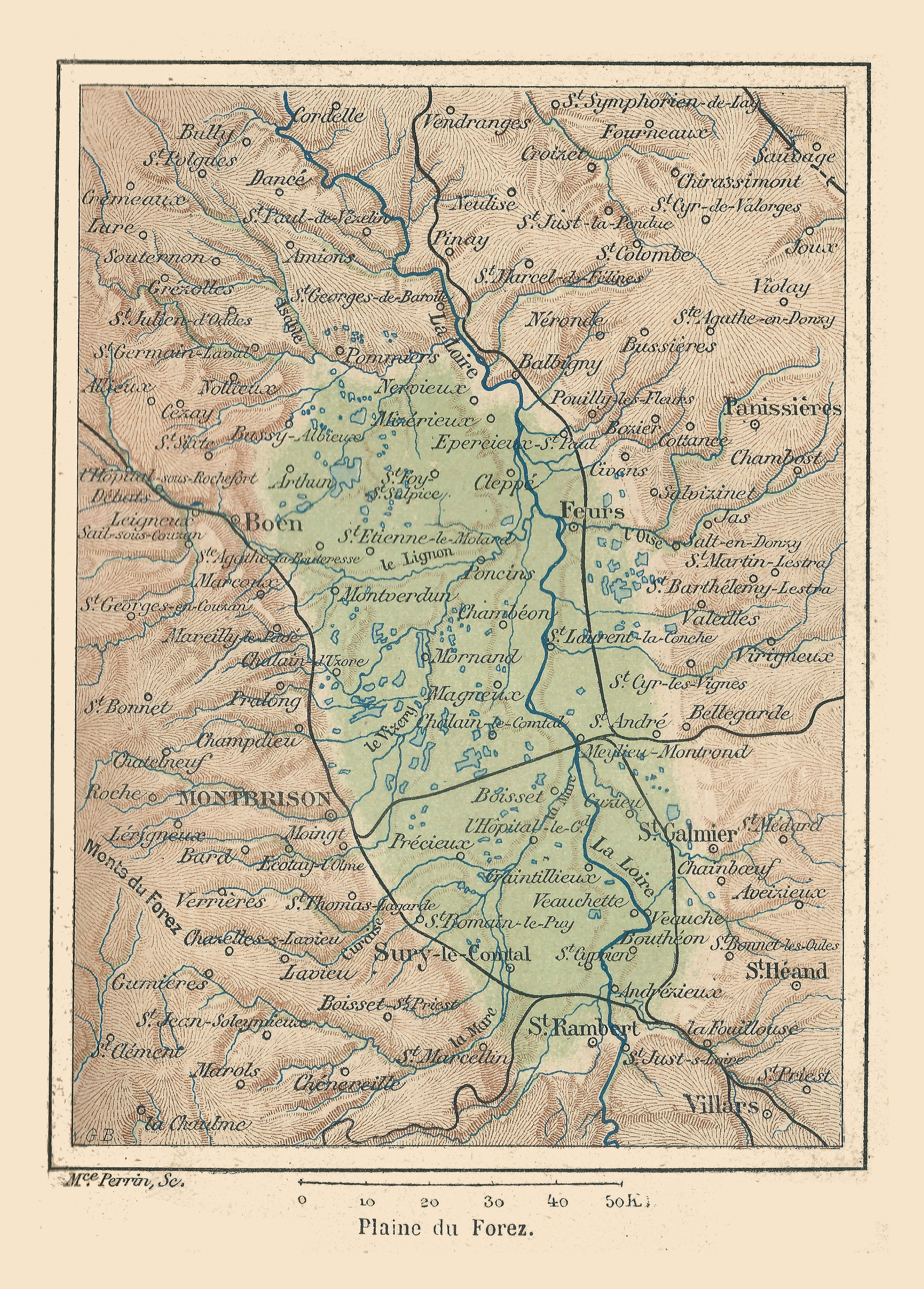
Map of the Plain of Forez, 1894.

The final "z" in Forez (French pronunciation: [fɔʁɛ]) is not pronounced in the Loire département; however, it is pronounced in the western part of the former province, essentially when referring to the correspondent Forez mountains (on the border between Puy-de-Dôme and Loire. The name is derived from the city of Feurs. Franco-Provençal is the language that was historically spoken in the region.

Map of the Ancien Régime Gouvernement général de Lyon with the former provinces of Forez, Lyonnais and Beaujolais separated by the dotted lines. Colours indicate modern departments.

The city of Montbrison, Loire is considered the historical capital of the Forez.

Residents of the Forez are called Foréziens.

The rue du Forez in the third arrondissement of Paris was built in the late 16th century and appears on Turgot's map of Paris.

Honoré d'Urfé was a native of Forez, and set his novel L'Astrée there.

== List of counts of Forez ==
The origins of the county of Forez are obscure. There are several early figures who are sometimes supposed to have been counts of Forez. Whether these are considered counts or not can affect the numbering offered for the later counts.

- William (I), recorded as a count in 925 in a document of the Abbey of Savigny
- William (II), recorded as a count in 944 in a document of the Abbey of Cluny
- Artaud (I), alleged brother of William (II), died 960
- Gerard (I), alleged son of Artaud (I), died 990

The counts of Forez were also counts of Lyon in the Empire until 1173, when the countship of Lyon passed to the Archbishop of Lyon.

=== House of Forez ===
- Artaud I (II) (died before 1010)
  - Pons (died 1011/1016), from the ruling house of Gévaudan, ruled Forez through marriage
- Artaud II (III) (died c.1017)
- Gerard I (II) (died after 1046)
- Artaud III (IV) (died 1079)
- William I (III) (1079–1097)
- William II (IV) (died after 1107)
- Eustace (died 1110/1117)
  - Guy (1107?–1115?), from the ruling house of Guînes, ruled Forez through marriage

The period between 1096 and 1115 is uncertain owing to a lack of sources.

=== House of Albon ===
- Guigues I (II) (1107?–1138), son of Guiges-Raymond (sometimes numbered Guigues I) and Ide-Raymond, daughter of Artaud III
- Guigues II (III) (1138–1199)
- Guigues III (IV) (1199–1203)
- Guigues IV (V) (1203–1241)
- Guigues V (VI) (1241–1259)
- Renaud (1259–1270)
- Guigues VI (VII) (1270–1279)
- John I (1279–1333)
- Guigues VII (VIII) (1333–1358)
- Louis (1358–1362)
- John II (1362–1369)
- Jeanne (1369–1372)
- Anne (1372–1417)

=== House of Bourbon ===
- John I (1417–1434)
- Charles I (1434–1456)
- John II (1456–1488)
- Charles II (1488)
- Peter (1488–1503)
- Suzanne (1505–1521)
  - Charles III (1505–1521), count by marriage

=== House of Savoy ===
- Louise (1521–1531)

United to the French crown in 1531.

=== Appanage ===
- Henry (1566–1574), future King Henry III

United to the French crown permanently in 1574.
