= Château de Gien =

Coordinates: 47.6847°N 2.6319°E

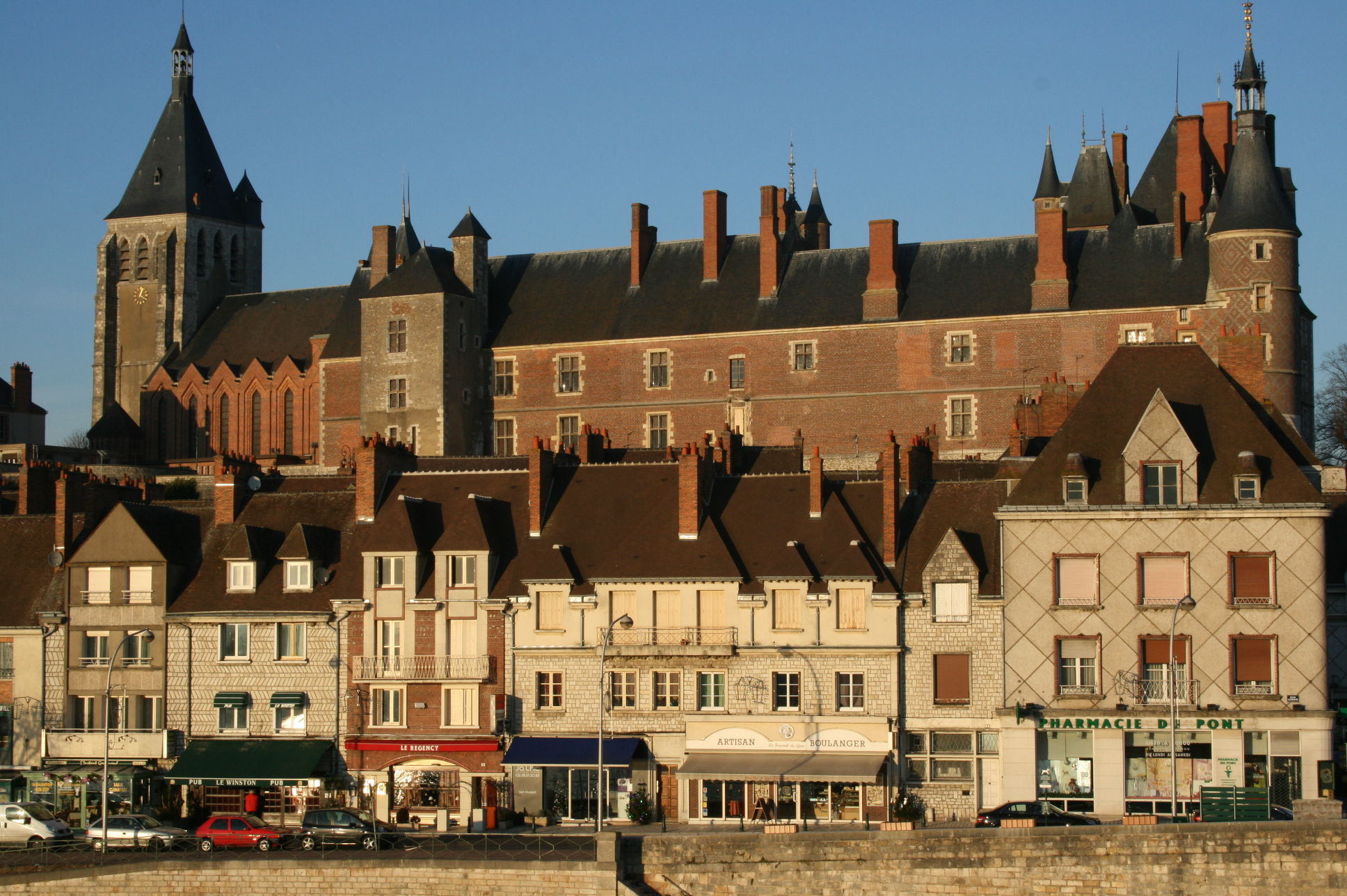
- Interactive map of the Château de Gien area

The Château de Gien is a historic manor in Gien, Loiret, Indre-et-Loire, Centre-Val de Loire, France.

== History ==
It was built in the 15th century for Anne of France. Guests included King Francis I, King Henry II, Queen consort Catherine de' Medici, King Charles IX, Queen consort Anne of Austria and King Louis XIV.

It has belonged to the French government since 1823. During World War II, it was bombed in 1940 and later restored. It is home to a museum about hunting.

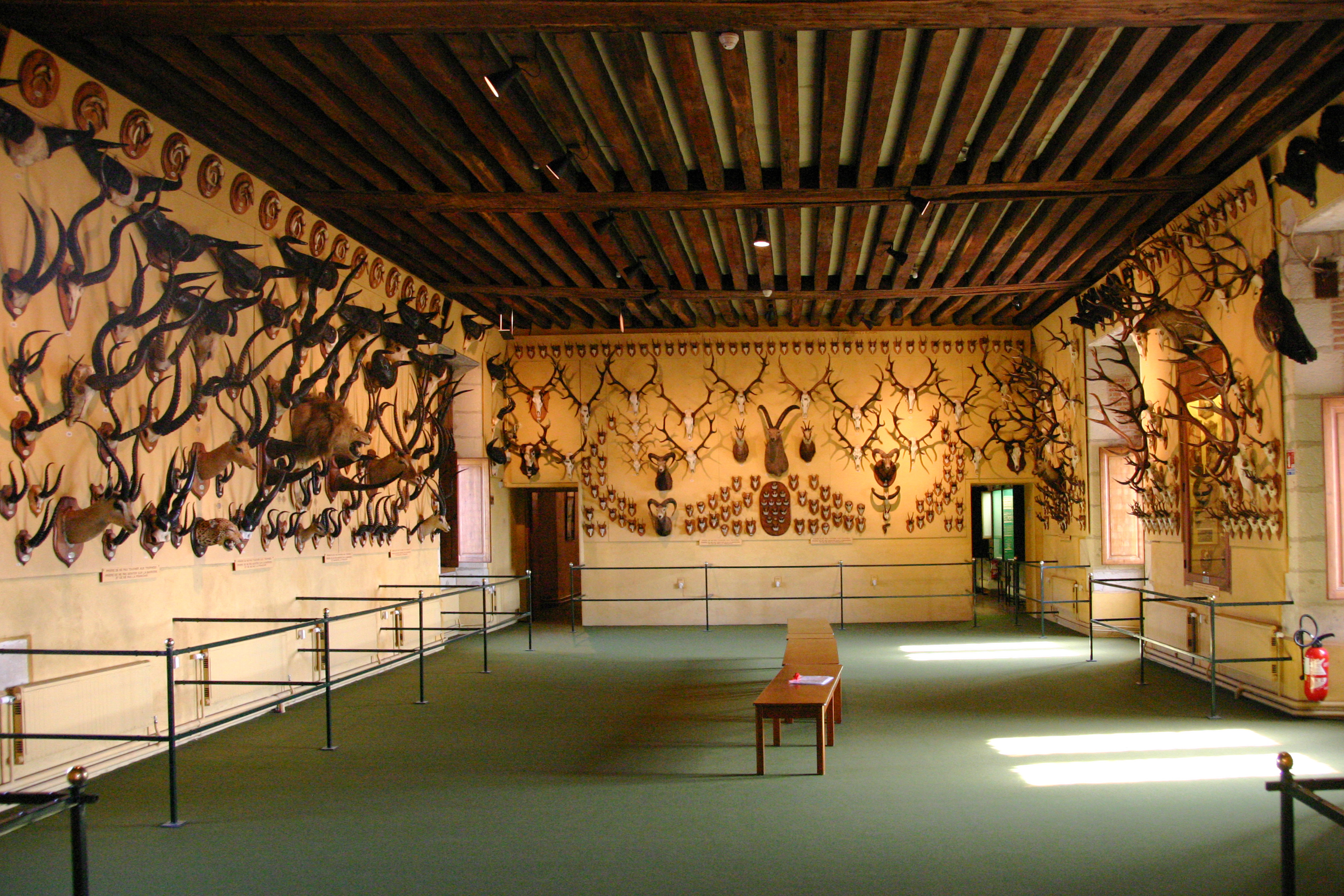
Hunting museum

== Architectural significance ==
It has been listed as an official monument since 1840.
