= Louis VIII of France =

King of France from 1223 to 1226

Louis VIII
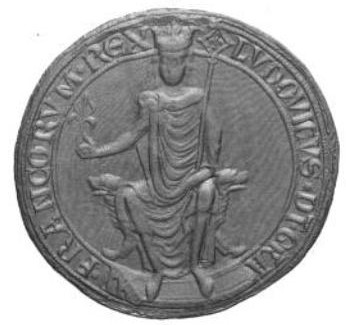
- Seal of Louis VIII

King of France
- Reign: 14 July 1223 – 8 November 1226
- Coronation: 6 August 1223, Reims Cathedral
- Predecessor: Philip II
- Successor: Louis IX

King of England (disputed)
- Reign: 2 June 1216 – 20 September 1217
- Predecessor: John
- Successor: Henry III
- Born: 5 September 1187; Paris, France
- Died: 8 November 1226 (aged 39); Château de Montpensier, France
- Burial: Saint Denis Basilica
- Spouse: Blanche of Castile (m. 1200)
- Issue more...: Louis IX, King of France; Robert I, Count of Artois; Alphonse, Count of Poitiers; Isabelle of France; Charles I, King of Sicily
- House: Capet
- Father: Philip II of France
- Mother: Isabella of Hainault

Louis VIII (5 September 1187 – 8 November 1226), nicknamed The Lion (French: Le Lion), (Note: The nickname was bestowed on him posthumously by the contemporary poet Nicholas of Bray.) was King of France from 1223 to 1226. As a prince, he invaded England on 21 May 1216 and was excommunicated by a papal legate on 29 May 1216. On 2 June 1216, Louis was proclaimed "King of England" by rebellious barons in London, though never crowned. With the assistance of allies in England and Scotland he gained control of approximately one third of the English kingdom and part of southern Wales. He was eventually defeated by English loyalists and those barons who swapped sides following the death of King John. After the Treaty of Lambeth, he was paid 10,000 marks, pledged never to invade England again, and was absolved of his excommunication.

As prince and fulfilling the crusading vow of his father, Philip II, Louis led forces during the Albigensian Crusade in support of Simon de Montfort the Elder, from 1219 to 1223, and as king, from January 1226 to September 1226. Crowned king in 1223, Louis's ordinance against Jewish usury, a reversal of his father's policies, led to the establishment of Lombard moneylenders in Paris.

Louis's campaigns in 1224 and 1226 against the Angevin Empire gained him Poitou, Saintonge, and La Rochelle, as well as numerous cities in Languedoc, thus leaving the Angevin Kings of England with Gascony as their only remaining continental possession. Louis died in November 1226 from dysentery, while returning from the Albigensian Crusade, and was succeeded by his son, Louis IX.

== Prince Louis ==
=== Early years ===
Born 5 September 1187, Louis was the son of King Philip II "Augustus" of France and Isabella of Hainault. His mother died in 1190, but Louis was not formally invested as Count of Artois. Instead, his father allowed him a nominal control over the county to learn about governance. In summer 1195, a marriage between Louis and Eleanor of Brittany, niece of King Richard I of England, was suggested for an alliance between Philip II and Richard, but it failed.

On 23 May 1200, Louis was married to Blanche of Castile, daughter of King Alfonso VIII of Castile and Eleanor of England. The marriage could only be concluded after prolonged negotiations between King Philip II of France and Blanche's uncle John, King of England.

=== Campaign of 1214 ===
In 1213, Louis occupied two towns in Flanders, St. Omer and Aire, which led to animosity between Louis's father, Philip II, and Count Renaud of Boulogne. By 1214, Philip II of France was facing an alliance consisting of King John of England, Emperor Otto IV, Count Renaud of Boulogne and Count Ferdinand of Flanders. Facing a two-front war, the first attack coming from Flanders, led by Otto, Renaud, and Ferdinand and supported by the Earl of Salisbury, would march south-west, while the other attack from Poitou, under John, would march north-east towards Paris.

Louis was given command of the front against John in Poitou. The first part of the campaign went well for the English, Louis being outmaneuvered by John, and losing the city of Angers by the end of June. When John besieged the castle of Roche-au-Moine, a key stronghold, Louis was forced give battle against John's army. When faced against Louis's forces, the local Poitevin nobles refused to advance with the king; left at something of a disadvantage, John retreated back to La Rochelle. Shortly afterwards, Philip won the hard-fought Battle of Bouvines in the north against Otto and John's other allies, bringing an end to John's hopes of retaking Normandy.

=== Albigensian crusade ===
In April 1215, Louis, fulfilling his father's vow to crusade against the Albigensians, was cautioned by a papal legate not to impede the crusade. At Narbonne, Louis ordered the destruction of the town's fortifications in response to the disagreement between Simon de Montfort and Arnaud Amalric and forced the viscount of Narbonne and other authorities to swear loyalty to Simon. While at Toulouse, he ordered the city officials to tear down their walls, fill in their moat, and to accept Simon de Montfort as the head of their government. Louis's involvement in the crusade favored Simon de Montfort at every turn.

=== Pretender to the English throne ===
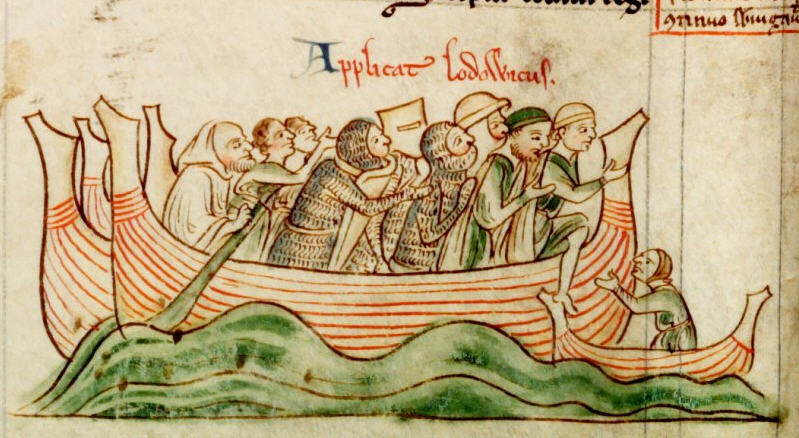
Arrival of Louis of France in England (from the Chronica Majora, Matthew Paris, c. 1236–1259)

In 1215, the English barons rebelled against the unpopular King John in the First Barons' War. The barons, seeing Louis's wife as a descendant of Henry II of England, offered the throne to him. While Louis prepared an army to press his claim to the English throne, a new papal legate, Cardinal Guala Bicchieri, who was traveling through France to England, explicitly condemned Louis's plan.

Louis landed unopposed on the Isle of Thanet in eastern Kent, England, at the head of an army on 21 May 1216. There was little resistance when the prince entered London, and he was proclaimed King Louis I of England at Old St Paul's Cathedral with great pomp and celebration in the presence of all of London. Even though he was not crowned, many nobles, as well as King Alexander II of Scotland on behalf of his English possessions, gathered to give homage. At Winchester on 29 May 1216, Cardinal Bicchieri excommunicated Louis and all his followers.

On 14 June 1216, Louis captured Winchester and soon controlled over half of the English kingdom. King John's death in October 1216 caused many of the rebellious barons to desert Louis in favour of John's nine-year-old son, Henry III. Louis, undeterred by Henry's reissuing of the Magna Carta, besieged and invested the castle of Hertford in December 1216. By 20 December 1216, he received a proposal for a truce, from regent William Marshal, 1st Earl of Pembroke, lasting from Christmas until 13 January. Louis accepted these terms and traveled back to London, on the way threatening to burn the abbey at St. Albans for the abbot's refusal to recognize him as King of England.

After his army was beaten at the Battle of Lincoln on 20 May 1217 and his naval forces were defeated at the Battle of Sandwich on 24 August 1217, Louis was forced to make peace on English terms. The principal provisions of the Treaty of Lambeth were an amnesty for English rebels, a pledge from Louis not to attack England again, and 10,000 marks to be given to Louis – a considerable sum at the time. In return Louis's excommunication was lifted.

== King Louis VIII ==
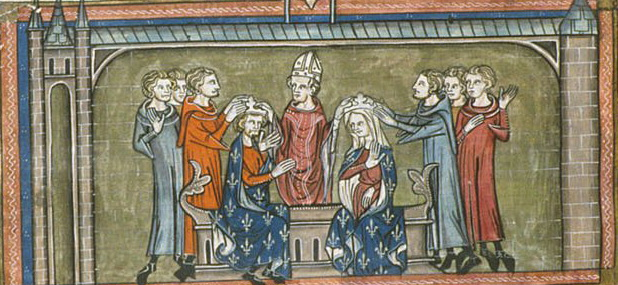
Coronation of Louis VIII and Blanche of Castile at Reims in 1223, miniature from the Grandes Chroniques de France, c. 1332–1350 (Bibliothèque nationale)

Louis succeeded his father on 14 July 1223; his coronation took place on 6 August of the same year in the cathedral at Reims. Amalric of Montfort traded Louis his claim on the county of Toulouse in return for becoming constable of the kingdom. As King, he refused to renew the truce with England on 5 May 1224. Instead Louis attacked the possession of the Angevins, invading Gascony, seizing Poitou (in 1224), La Rochelle (August 1224), and Saintonge. To accomplish this task, he treated with Hugh X of Lusignan, promising him the city of Bordeaux if Gascony were conquered. By the end of summer 1224, Louis had conquered Limousin, Perigord, and Quercy.

Louis's campaign in 1226 captured numerous cities in Languedoc. By 1226, Louis's lack of military support in Gascony had embittered Hugh X of Lusignan.

=== Policy on Jews ===
On 1 November 1223, Louis issued an ordinance that prohibited his officials from recording debts owed to Jews, thus reversing the policies set by his father Philip II Augustus. This removed any type of assistance for the Jews from the king or barons. Further, Christians would be required to repay only the principal of any loans owed to Jews. This principal would be paid to the king or other lords who had direct authority over the Jews. This caused such a major financial impact on Jewish moneylenders, that in 1225 Louis invited Lombard moneylenders to Paris.

=== Albigensian crusade as King ===
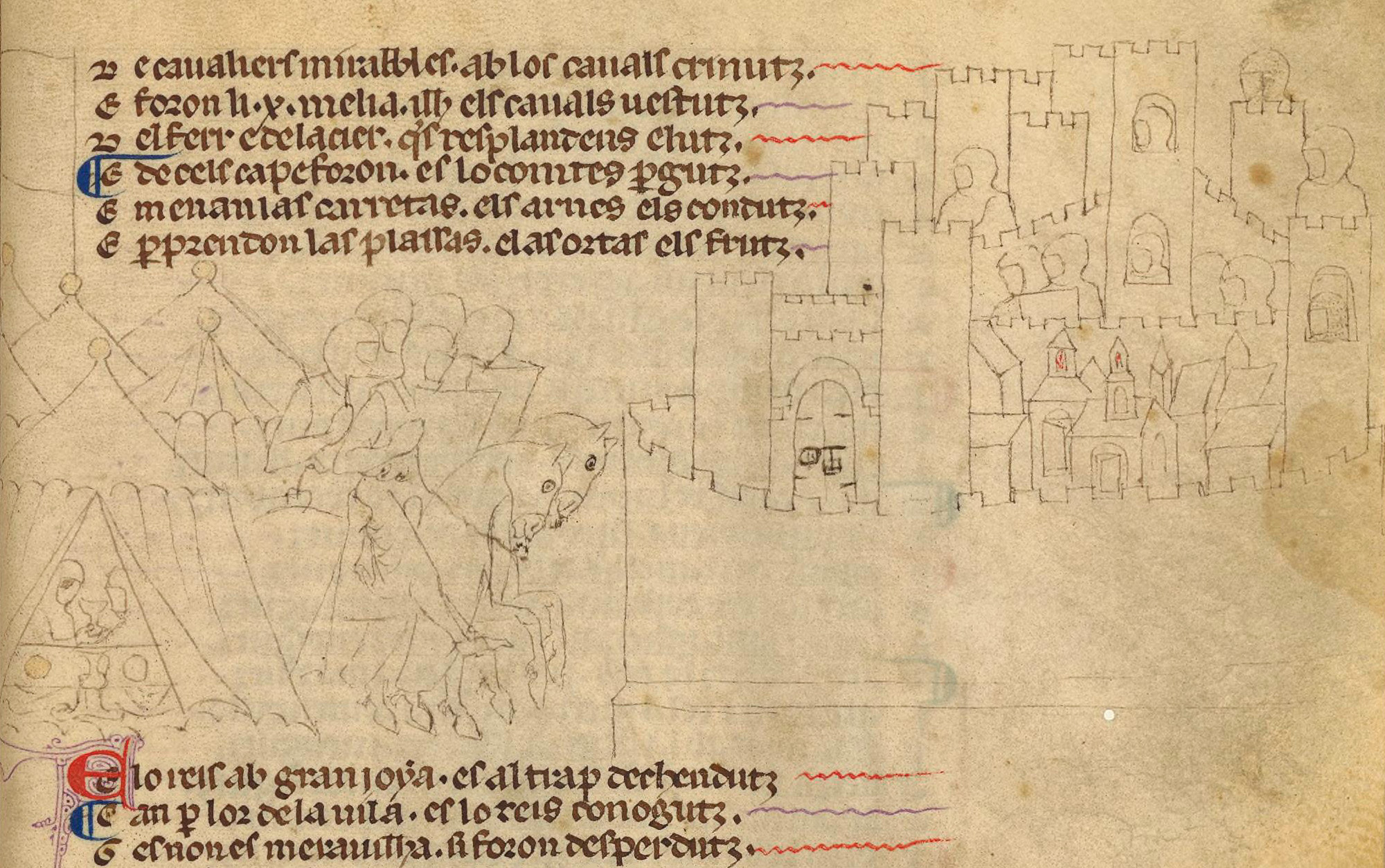
Capture of Marmande by the future Louis VIII during the Albigensian Crusade in 1219. Manuscript by William of Tudela and anonymous continuator, Song of the Albigensian Crusade, ink drawing, France, 13th century.

In 1223, Louis received a letter from Pope Honorius III, entreating him to move against the Albigensians. In early 1226, following the excommunication of Raymond VII of Toulouse at the Council of Bourges and the promise of a tenth of clerical incomes towards the next crusade, Louis took the cross, stating his intention to crusade against the Albigensians.

In May 1226, Louis assembled his army at Bourges and moving quickly captured the towns of Béziers, Carcassonne, Beaucaire, and Marseille. However, Avignon resisted, refusing to open its gates to the French troops. Not wanting to storm the city, Louis settled in for a siege. A frontal assault that August was fiercely beaten back. On 9 September 1226, the town surrendered, agreeing to pay 6,000 marks, handing over hostages, and destroying its walls. However, Louis's army took heavy losses besieging Avignon. Finally arriving at Toulouse in October 1226, it was apparent his army was too tired and too weak to attack. (Note: Barber states Louis's decision to not attack Toulouse may have been due to ill health.) Louis chose to return to Paris with the plan to attack Raymond VII of Toulouse next season.

=== Death ===
While returning to Paris, Louis became ill with dysentery and died on 8 November 1226 in the Château de Montpensier, Auvergne. His disposition, dated June 1225, instructed that his son Louis would succeed him as King, while younger sons were given apanages. Robert received Artois, John Tristan acquired Maine and Anjou, and Alphonse gained Poitou and Auvergne.

The Saint Denis Basilica, just to the north of Paris, houses the tomb of Louis VIII. His young son, Louis IX (born 1214, reigned 1226–1270), succeeded him as king of France.

== Marriage and issue ==
Arms of Louis VIII as King of France (azure semé-de-lis or), a device first used by his grandfather Louis VII

On 23 May 1200, Louis married Blanche of Castile. They had:

1. Blanche (1205–1206)
2. Philippe (9 September 1209 – 30 June 1218), betrothed in July 1215 (married in 1217) to Agnes of Donzy
3. Alphonse (26 January 1213, died shortly after birth), twin of John
4. John (26 January 1213, died shortly after birth), twin of Alphonse
5. Louis (Poissy, 25 April 1214 – 25 August 1270, Tunis), King Louis IX of France as successor to his father.
6. Robert (25 September 1216 – 9 February 1250, killed in battle, Mansoura, Egypt), Count of Artois
7. John Tristan (21 July 1219 – 1232), Count of Anjou and Maine, betrothed in March 1227 to Yolande of Brittany.
8. Alphonse (Poissy, 11 November 1220 – 21 August 1271, Corneto), Count of Poitou and Auvergne, and by marriage, of Toulouse
9. Philippe Dagobert (20 February 1222 – 1232)
10. Isabelle (16 March 1225 – 23 February 1270). Became a nun and later canonised as a saint.
11. Étienne [Stephen] (31 December 1225 – 21 March 1227)
12. Charles (posthumously 21 March 1227 – 7 January 1285), Count of Anjou and Maine, by marriage Count of Provence and Forcalquier. King of Sicily from 1266.

== Legacy ==
Louis left the French monarchy in control of Gascony and much of Languedoc. His decision to divert the payment of loans from Jewish moneylenders to lords in authority over them, led to a Parisian financial crisis which was averted by the introduction of Lombard moneylenders into Paris. Louis's crusade, which did not start until 1226, against the Cathars was largely successful taking Béziers, Carcassonne, Beaucaire, and Marseille. The costly victory at Avignon, however, rendered his army incapable of taking Toulouse. After his death, his wife, Blanche of Castile continued the crusade resulting in Raymond VII, Count of Toulouse, signing the Treaty of Paris (1229), which brought the monarchy the county of Toulouse in 1271 following the death of Louis's son Alphonse.

== Sources ==
- Baldwin, John W. (1991). The Government of Philip Augustus Foundations of French Royal Power in the Middle Ages. Berkeley: University of California Press. ISBN 0-520-07391-6.
- Barber, Malcolm (2014). The Cathars: Dualist Heretics in Languedoc in the High Middle Ages. London: Routledge. ISBN 978-0-58225-661-3.
- Barlow, Frank (1999). The Feudal Kingdom of England, 1042–1216. London: Pearson Education. ISBN 0-582-38117-7. OL 388175M.
- Bradbury, Jim (1997). Philip Augustus: King of France 1180–1223. The Medieval World. London: Routledge. ISBN 978-0-58206-059-3. OL 697996M.
- Carpenter, David (2004). The Struggle for Mastery: The Penguin History of Britain 1066–1284. London: Penguin. ISBN 978-0-14014-824-4. OL 7348814M.
- Carpenter, David (2020). Henry III: The Rise to Power and Personal Rule, 1207–1258. New Haven: Yale University Press. ISBN 978-0-30023-835-8.
- Daniell, Christopher (2003). From Norman Conquest to Magna Carta: England 1066–1215. London: Routledge. ISBN 0-415-22215-X.
- Farmer, Sharon (2017). The Silk Industries of Medieval Paris: Artisanal Migration, Technological Innovation, and Gendered Experience. Philadelphia: University of Pennsylvania Press. ISBN 978-0-81224-848-7.
- Gardner, Christopher K. (2005). "Heretics or Lawyers? Propaganda and Toulousan Identity through the Albigensian Crusade". In Hayes-Healy, Stephanie (ed.). Medieval Paradigms. Vol. I: Essays in Honor of Jeremy duQuesnay Adams. London: Palgrave Macmillan. pp. 115–138. ISBN 978-1-34973-497-9.
- Hanley, Catherine (2016). Louis: The French Prince Who Invaded England. New Haven: Yale University Press. ISBN 978-0-30021-745-2. OL 27211891M.
- Harding, Alan (1993). England in the Thirteenth Century. Cambridge: Cambridge University Press. ISBN 0-521-30274-9.
- Harper-Bill, Christopher (2003). "John and the Church of Rome". In Church, S.D. (ed.). King John: New Interpretations. Woodbridge: The Boydell Press. pp. 289–315. ISBN 978-0-85115-736-8.
- Jones, Nigel (2012). Tower: An Epic History of the Tower of London. New York: St. Martin's Publishing. ISBN 978-1-25003-840-1.
- Jordan, William Chester (1999). "The Capetians from the death of Philip II to Philip IV". In Abulafia, David (ed.). The New Cambridge Medieval History. Vol. 5, c.1198 – c.1300. Cambridge: Cambridge University Press. pp. 279–313. ISBN 0-521-36289-X.
- Kelly, Jessen (2017). "Forms of Testimony in Dirk Bouts's Justice of Otto III". In Bradbury, Carlee A.; Moseley-Christian, Michelle (eds.). Gender, Otherness, and Culture in Medieval and Early Modern Art. Cham: Springer International. pp. 91–119. ISBN 978-3-31965-048-7.
- Léglu, Catherine; Rist, Rebecca; Taylor, Claire, eds. (2014). The Cathars And The Albigensian Crusade: A Sourcebook. London: Routledge. ISBN 978-0-41573-688-6.
- Lock, Peter (2006). The Routledge Companion to the Crusades. London: Routledge. ISBN 0-415-24732-2.
- McDougall, Sara (2017). Royal Bastards: The Birth of Illegitimacy, 800–1230. Oxford: Oxford University Press. ISBN 978-0-19878-582-8.
- Petit-Dutaillis, Charles (1895). Étude sur la vie et le règne de Louis VIII (1187–1226) (in French). Paris: Émile Bouillon. OCLC 5023824. OL 6941357M.
- Pollock, M.A. (2015). Scotland, England and France After the Loss of Normandy, 1204–1296: "Auld Amitie". Woodbridge: The Boydell Press. ISBN 978-1-84383-992-7.
- Richard, Jean (1992). Saint Louis, Crusader King of France. Cambridge: Cambridge University Press. ISBN 978-0-52138-156-7.
- Rist, Rebecca (2016). Popes and Jews, 1095–1291. Cambridge: Oxford University Press. ISBN 978-0-19871-798-0.
- Strayer, Joseph R. (1992). The Albigensian Crusades. Ann Arbor: University of Michigan Press. ISBN 978-0-47209-476-9.
- Warren, W. Lewis (1997). King John. Yale English Monarchs. New Haven: Yale University press. ISBN 978-0-30007-373-7. OL 4298229M.
- William of Puylaurens (2003). Sibley, W.A.; Sibley, M.D. (eds.). The Chronicle of William of Puylaurens: The Albigensian Crusade and its Aftermath. Woosbridge: The Boydell Press. ISBN 978-0-85115-925-6.

Louis VIII of France House of Capet Born: 5 September 1187 Died: 8 November 1226
Regnal titles
Preceded by Philip II	King of France; 14 July 1223 – 8 November 1226	Succeeded by Louis IX
Preceded by John	— DISPUTED — King of England; May 1216 – 22 September 1217; Disputed by John and Henry III	Succeeded by Henry III
French nobility
Preceded by Isabella	Count of Artois; 1190 – 1223	Vacant Merged into the crown Title next held by Robert I
