= Battle of Toron Saladini =

Battle in the later Crusades

Battle of Toron Saladini (1269)
- Part of Crusade of the Infants of Aragon
Date	19 December 1269
Location	Near Montfort Castle
Result	Mamluk victory

Belligerents
Kingdom of Jerusalem; Kingdom of France	Mamluk Sultanate

Commanders and leaders
Robert de Crésèques †; Olivier de Termes	Jamal al-Din al-Shamsi; Ala’ al-Din Aydughdi

Strength
130–200 knights + sergeants and turcopoles	3,000 men

Casualties and losses
400 killed	Unknown

The Battle of Toron Saladini was a military engagement between the Crusaders and the Mamluks in Toron Saladini between Acre and Montfort. The Mamluks ambushed the Crusader force and wiped it out.

== Background ==
In the year 1267, a Mongol embassy appeared in Perpignan to establish an alliance with the Aragonese king James I. James resolved to cross and sail to the holy land for a crusade since the crusader holds in the Levant were threatened by the Mamluk Sultan Baybars. Two years later on September 9, the Aragonese king set sail from Barcelona. The fleet, however, was partially wrecked and scattered. James gave up the idea of crusading and set sail for home. James's sons Pedro Fernández and Fernán Sánchez, who had been given command of part of the fleet, did continue on their way to Acre and landed in October. Their arrival caused joy in Acre.

Baybars was informed of the Crusader arrival and left Egypt in late November with a small force of 3,000 Mamluks; Baybars reached Damascus in early December. The Mongols withdrew on news of his arrival. They were unable to invade northern Syria. Having heard the Sultan brought only a small force, the Latin crusaders in Acre were led by Robert de Crésèques, and the French regiment in Acre was left by King Louis IX of France, led by Olivier de Termes, and launched a raid. The Aragonese forces stayed behind outside of Acre, hoping to take advantage of Robert's inexperience.

== Battle ==
The Crusader forces consisted of 130–200 knights and a number of sergeants and turcopoles. They raid the Muslim villages in the region of Montfort Castle, which was held by the Teutonic Order. Meanwhile, the Mamluk Sultan received reports of crusader movements and assembled all units in Palestine to confront the crusaders. The Mamluks crossed the Daughters of Jacob Bridge and moved his troops near Acre in a night march. Meanwhile, he ordered the emirs Jamal al-Din al-Shamsi and ‘Ala’ al-Din Aydughdi to attack the crusaders with the troops from ‘Ayn Jalut and Safad, then to feign flight and to lure them into the vicinity of Toron Saladini, where he lay in ambush with the main fighting force.

After their raid, the Crusaders returned to Acre; however, on their way of return, they encountered the Mamluks on December 19. Seeing the disparity of forces, Oliver advised for retreat instead of facing the Mamluks, but Robert was eager to fight and prove his worth in his new position. The Crusaders chased the Mamluk Safed's contingent to the main vanguard of the Mamluk force. The Crusader force was almost wiped out before the Sultan's arrival on the battlefield. Learning of this defeat, the Aragonese crusaders shut themselves behind Acre and never dare to venture outside.

== Aftermath ==
The Aragonese crusaders, who made no attempt to fight the Mamluks, returned home in spring of 1270. The first directed response to Baybar campaigns ended in failure.

== Sources ==
- Peter Thorau (1993), The Lion of Egypt : Sultan Baybars I and the Near East in the thirteenth century.
- Michael Lower (2018), The Tunis Crusade of 1270. A Mediterranean History.
- René Grousset (1934), The History of the Crusades and the Frankish Kingdom of Jerusalem, Vol III. The Muslim Monarchy and Frankish Anarchy.
