= Crusade of the Infants of Aragon =

Crusade in late 1269

The Crusade of the Infants of Aragon (Note: Also called the Catalan Crusade or Crusade of James I.) was a minor crusade that took place in late 1269. It had its genesis in the same events that led to the Eighth Crusade of the following year. The intention of King James I of Aragon was to join forces with the Mongol Ilkhanate and jointly attack the Mamluk Sultanate. In the event, James himself abandoned the enterprise after a storm forced his fleet into port in September. Two of his illegitimate sons, the infantes Fernando Sánchez de Castro and Pedro Fernández de Híjar, led what remained of the fleet to Acre, but the rendezvous with the Mongols was abandoned and their small force accomplished little before they returned home in the spring of 1270.

== Primary sources ==
A page from a 15th-century copy of the Llibre dels fets, showing James's own account of his crusade

The main French sources for the crusade of 1269 are the Gestes des Chiprois, the Estoire d'Eracles and the Annales de Terre Sainte.

In Catalan, there is James's autobiography, the Llibre dels fets. There is also a document in the General Archive of the Crown of Aragon, called the Llibre de racions al Orient, which lists payments owed to members of the expedition and gives a list of the owners and captains of the ships.

From the Muslim perspective, there are the Arabic histories of Ibn al-Furāt and Ibn ʿAbd al-Ẓāhir.

== Planning ==
James I may have intended to send a force to the Holy Land in 1260 to help defend it against a possible Mongol invasion, only to relent in the face of adverse weather. He certainly made a vow to go on crusade in late 1266. He was at the time excommunicated for adultery. On 16 January 1267, Pope Clement IV ordered him to abandon his mistress, Berenguela Alfonso, or else there would be no spiritual merit in his crusade. Around that same time, the Ilkhan Abaqa sent an embassy to visit first Clement IV and then James I. They met with James at Perpignan in the early spring and James dispatched his own ambassador, Jayme Alaric de Perpignan, to return with them to the court of Abaqa.

Abaqa's envoys and Jayme Alaric began their return to Europe in the spring of 1268. In December 1268 and January 1269, they met James in Valencia. They proposed that he should land with an army in Ayaş in Cilician Armenia, where Abaqa would be join him with his own forces and those of his allies, the Byzantine emperor Michael VIII and King Hethum I of Armenia. A letter from Abaqa to the pope later that summer, however, refers not to Abaqa's personal participation but to that of his brother, Ejei. According to James's own account, Abaqa promised to provide his army with food and siege engines, which would have been too bulky to efficiently transport across the sea. Michael VIII likewise promised to send supplies by sea. The alliance's plans were sufficiently concrete by February 1269 to be presented to King Louis IX of France. That spring, Abaqa sent a formal challenge to the Sultan Baybars I.

King Alfonso IX of Castile advised James not to go, because the Mongols were not to be trusted. Nevertheless, he gave him 100,000 morabetinos and 100 horses for the expedition. James also received 80,000 sous tournois from Barcelona; 50,000 from Majorca; and 10,000 from Morella. Most of this was spent on ships and victuals. The force that had assembled by in Barcelona by late August consisted of about 800 knights and several thousand infantry. To carry it across the sea there were 30 large ships, 20 galleys and many smaller craft. The captain of the fleet was Ramon Marquet. The most notable ecclesiastic present was Bishop Arnau of Barcelona. James's heir, Peter, remained behind, to prevent a succession crisis in the event of James's death.

== Expedition ==
On 4 September 1269, the fleet sailed from Barcelona. On 6 September, the fleet was hit by severe weather that lasted five days. Interpreting this as a sign of divine disapproval, James ordered the fleet to put in. On 16 September, it approached Aigues-Mortes, but strong winds prevented its landing. It finally made port at Agde on 17 September. While some counselled him to return home and others to continue the crusade, James recuperated at Montpellier before deciding to return overland to Catalonia, where he arrived in October.

A part of the fleet under the infantes—18 ships with 442 knights—opted to weather the rough seas and continue the voyage. They arrived at Acre late in October and camped outside the city. There was no longer any question of a rendezvous with the Mongols, both because of the reduced fleet and because of a Chagatayid attack on the Ilkhanate in central Asia. In the end, some of the promised barley did arrive from the Byzantines. Of the 442 knights who landed in Acre, 254 opted to return home a month later when they realized that James would not be coming. Pedro, the senior infante, was left in command of 188 knights by early December. Some food was sent to them from Catalonia, and possibly some reinforcements as well.

Around the time the Aragonese arrived, the Mongols began raiding in the vicinity of Sajur. This prompted Baybars to set out from Egypt in late November for Damascus, where he arrived early the following month. At his arrival, the Mongols withdrew. The French regiment, however, led by Olivier de Termes and Robert de Crésèques, launched a raid beyond Montfort Castle, believing that Baybars had brought too small a force (some 3,000 men) to seriously threaten them. Baybars ordered the men of Safad to attack the raiders while he retreated southwards to Toron in the hopes of drawing them into an ambush. The raiders and the men of Safad fought an engagement on 19 December, after which Olivier pushed for a withdrawal towards Acre. Robert, however, ordered a pursuit. He was killed and his force decimated by the sultan's vanguard before Baybars and the main force had even arrived.

The infantes returned home in the spring of 1270.

== Notes and references ==
=== Works cited ===
- Bisson, Thomas N. (1986). The Medieval Crown of Aragon: A Short History. Clarendon Press.
- Carreras Candi, Francesc (1909). "La creuada a Terra Santa (1269–1270)". Primer Congrés d'Història de la Corona d'Aragó dedicat al Rey en Jaume I y a la seua època. Barcelona. pp. 106–138.
- Crawford, Paul, ed. (2003). The 'Templar of Tyre': Part III of the 'Deeds of the Cypriots'. Routledge.
- Garcia i López, Ruth (2015). "La Imposta Paleobizantina trobada a la Basílica de Santa Maria de Mataró (Maresme)". Sessió d'Estudis Mataronins. 31: 289–299.
- Hillgarth, Jocelyn N. (1976). The Spanish Kingdoms 1250–1516. Vol. 1 (1215–1410): Precarious Balance. Clarendon Press.
- Jackson, Peter (2005). The Mongols and the West, 1221–1410. Routledge.
- Lower, Michael (2018). The Tunis Crusade of 1270: A Mediterranean History. Oxford University Press.
- Marshall, Christopher (1994). Warfare in the Latin East, 1192–1291. Cambridge University Press.
- Richard, Jean (1989). "La croisade de 1270, premier « passage général » ?". Comptes rendus des séances de l'Académie des Inscriptions et Belles-Lettres. 133 (2): 510–523.
- Runciman, Steven (1954). A History of the Crusades. Vol. 3: The Kingdom of Acre and the Later Crusades. Cambridge University Press.
- Smith, Damian; Buffery, Helena, eds. (2003). The Book of Deeds of James I of Aragon: A Translation of the Medieval Catalan Llibre dels Fets. Ashgate.
- Smith, Damian (2006). "Guerra Santa y Tierra Santa en el pensamiento y la acción del rey Jaime I de Aragón". In D. Baloup; P. Josserand (eds.). Regards croisés sur la guerre sainte: Guerre idéologie et religion dans l'espace méditerranéen latin (XI^{e}–XIII^{e} siècle. Méridiennes. Toulouse. pp. 305–321. ISBN 9782810710171.
