= Varennes, Somme =

Varennes
- Commune
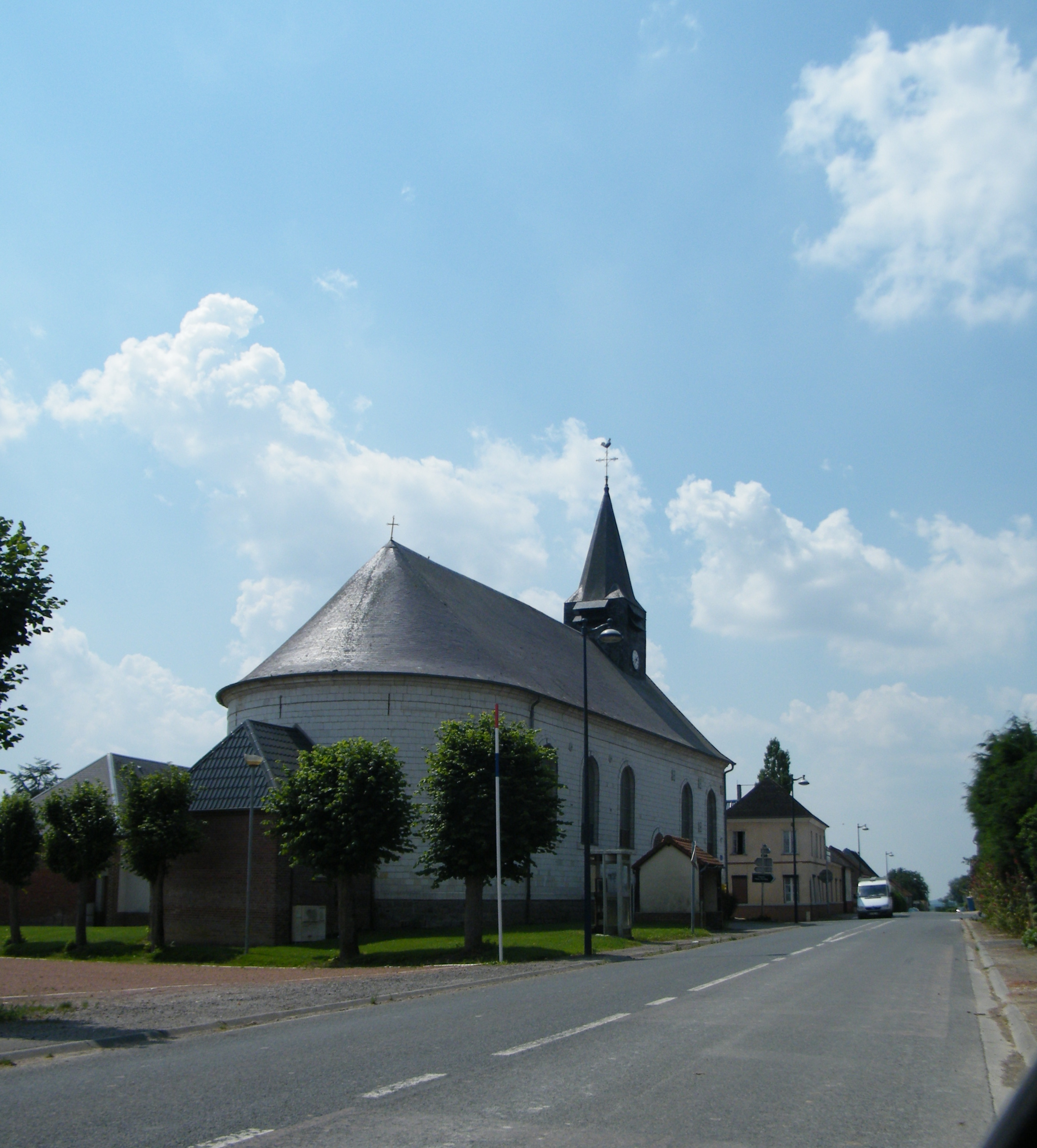
- The church in Varennes

- Coat of arms
- Location of Varennes
- Location within France Location within Hauts-de-France
- Coordinates: 50°02′58″N 2°32′05″E
- Country: France
- Region: Hauts-de-France
- Department: Somme
- Arrondissement: Péronne
- Canton: Albert
- Intercommunality: Pays du Coquelicot

Government
  - Mayor (2020–2026): Sylvie Brood
- Area^{1}: 7.24 km^{2} (2.80 sq mi)
- Elevation: 147 m (482 ft)
- Highest elevation: 156 m (512 ft)
- Lowest elevation: 83 m (272 ft)
- Population (2023): 222
  - Density: 30.7/km^{2} (79.4/sq mi)
- Time zone: UTC+01:00 (CET)
  - Summer (DST): UTC+02:00 (CEST)
- INSEE/Postal code: 80776 /80560
- ^{1} French Land Register data, which excludes lakes, ponds, glaciers > 1 km^{2} (0.386 sq mi or 247 acres) and river estuaries.

Varennes (French pronunciation: [vaʁɛn]; also: Varennes-en-Croix) is a commune in the Somme department in Hauts-de-France in northern France.

== Geography ==
Varennes is situated 15 miles (24 km) northeast of Amiens, at the junction of the D47, D447 and D179, in the form of a cross.

== History ==
=== Middle Ages ===
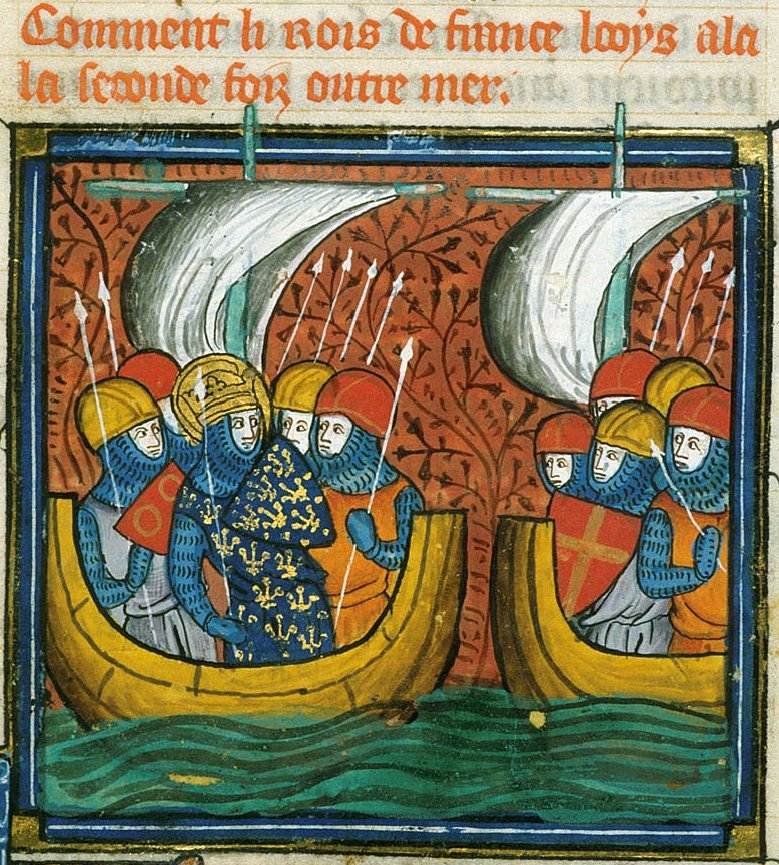
Florent, lord of Varennes, on the 2nd boat, with his shield "Gules a Cross Or"

The settlement of Franc-Mailly was located at the site of the present-day cemetery of Varennes, where the seigneurs made their home, with a farm and a mill. Wishing to promote the culture of their region, land was granted to the people to build homes, free from any kind of duties and taxes. Over time the village of Franc-Mailly became a popular haunt for criminals. According to tradition, in 1069 the four corners of the village of Franc-Mailly were burnt down on the orders of the Seigneur. The remaining core of the village, grouped around the manor house, became Varennes.

Florent de Varennes, lord of Varennes, son-in-law of John II, Count of Soissons, became the first Admiral of France, heading the naval journey to North Africa, where Saint Louis IX led the Eighth Crusade. Like the King and Prince John Tristan of France, Count of Valois, he died in front of Tunis in August 1270, due to dysentery. His coat of arms "Gules a Cross Or" (Red with a gold cross) is still the coat of arms of the village.

=== Charles the Bold ===
In 1472, Charles the Bold invaded Picardy in retaliation against Louis XI who had refused to ratify the treaty on October 3, 1471 in which Charles claimed possession of Amiens, Saint-Quentin and the Vimeu. Many villages were burnt down, including that of Varennes, which was rebuilt with its streets in the shape of a cross".

=== The Thirty Years' War and the tunnels of Varennes ===
During the Thirty Years War, Varennes suffered looting and destruction by Spanish troops, as testified by a verbatim record of 1636, in which it says that the village was burned down in September 1635.
In order to protect themselves from armed troops, the inhabitants of Varennes dug a large tunnel. The underpass beneath the town square and the church is made up of a gallery 39m long with 29 rooms, all of which were fitted with wooden doors. Eight of the rooms had wells for fresh water.
In the most recent excavations in 1970, various inscriptions were noted on the walls: "1636 Adrien Lefebvre"; “1660 Guillomin Ringard”; “Antonin Goubet in the year 1677"; they also found a coin dated 1656.
Having served as an underground refuge for the population, the tunnels were probably used as a workplace in the winter. They were eventually closed because of the danger of collapse.

=== War of 1870 ===
In September 1870, during the Franco-Prussian War, Varennes was occupied by the Germans for three or four days, the village was subjected to theft, damage to housing and they had to feed the enemy troops and horses. The village was also forced to pay war reparations to the tune of 4122 Francs.

=== First World War ===
In 1916, the front line between the French and German forces was located about 7 kilometres (4 mi) from Varennes. Many underpasses were constructed and occupied in the surrounding villages, the tunnels of Varennes was occupied until Easter 1918 by British troops. In the tunnels, there’s an inscription “J. Connoly, Smith, Baker Sgt, 1918”.

== Places of interest ==
- The church, rebuilt in 1771 with materials taken from the château of Hyerville, which had been destroyed after the death of Catherine de Rinchevalle. The church has a single nave. In 1803 the tower of 1771 was rebuilt.

== Heraldry ==
"Gules a Cross Or", coat of arms of the village of Varennes was the one of Florent de Varennes, the first Admiral of France

== Population ==
Historical population

Year	Pop.	±% p.a.
1793	574	—
1821	697	+0.70%
1846	658	−0.23%
1872	544	−0.73%
1901	417	−0.91%
1926	290	−1.44%
1946	259	−0.56%
1962	233	−0.66%
1968	211	−1.64%

Year	Pop.	±% p.a.
1975	184	−1.94%
1982	181	−0.23%
1990	181	+0.00%
1999	177	−0.25%
2007	190	+0.89%
2012	208	+1.83%
2017	220	+1.13%
2023	222	+0.15%

Source: EHESS and INSEE (1968-2023)

== See also ==
- Communes of the Somme department
