= Raoul II =

Raoul II may refer to:

- Raoul II of Tosny (died 1102)
- Raoul II of Nesle (died c.1160)
- Raoul II, Count of Vermandois (died 1167)
- Raoul II of Lusignan (c. 1200 – ?)
- Raoul II, Lord of Coucy (died 1250)
- Raoul II Sores, marshal of France briefly in 1270
- Raoul II of Brienne, Count of Eu (d. 1350)
- Raoul II de Clermont (?–1302)
