= Raoul II Sores =

13th-century Marshal of France

Raoul II († 1282), called Sores or d'Estrée, was the marshal of France briefly in 1270 following the death of Héric de Beaujeu and before being replaced or joined by Lancelot de Saint-Maard.

He accompanied Louis IX on the Eighth Crusade to Africa in 1270, bringing six knights. After Héric died at the Siege of Tunis, Raoul was elevated to the dignity.

The register of the Parlement records his death in 1282.
