= Florent de Varennes =

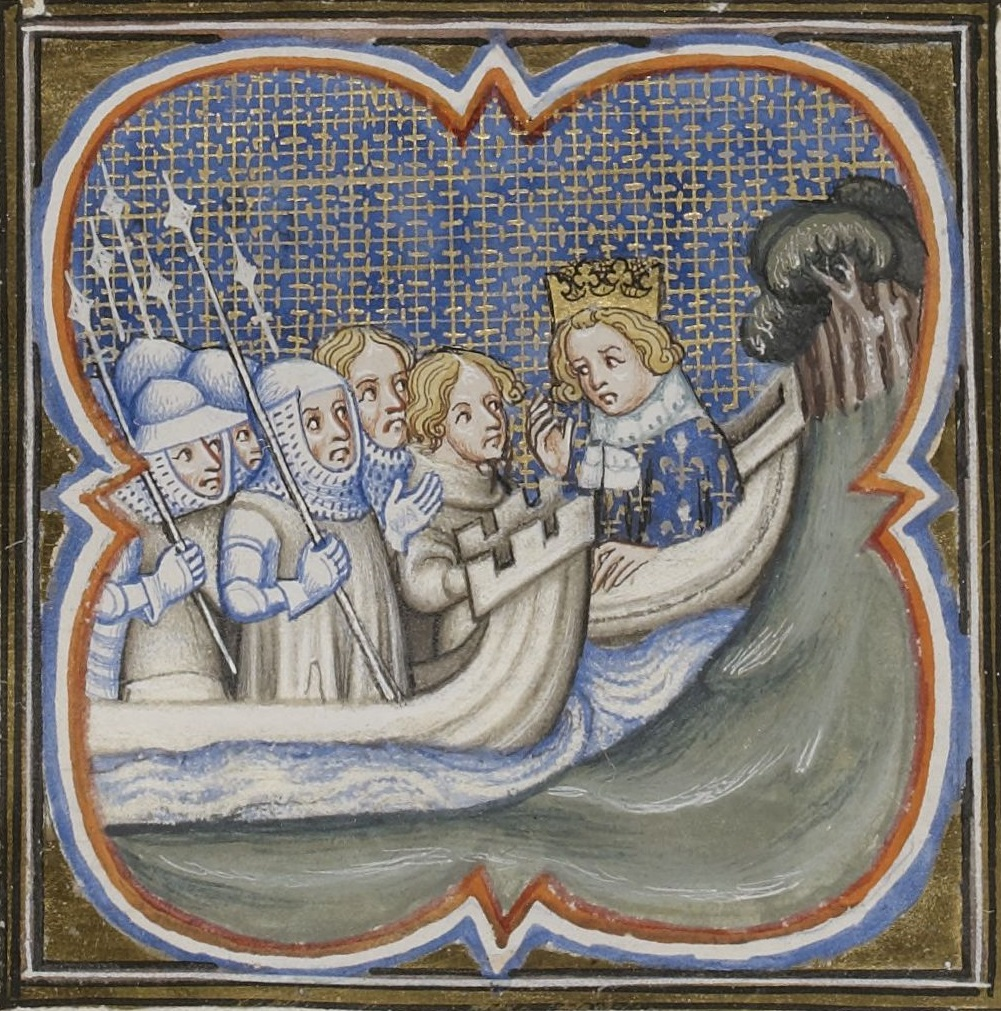
Louis IX of France towards the Eighth Crusade

Florent de Varennes (died in Tunis in August 1270) was the first Admiral of France, in 1269, and as such, became the head of the fleet during the Eighth Crusade and the last led by King Saint Louis IX.

== Family ==
He was lord of Varennes, in Picardy.

He was married to Yolande de Nesle, daughter of John II de Nesle, Count of Soissons and Marie de Chimay. They had a son named Mathieu.

== Eighth Crusade ==
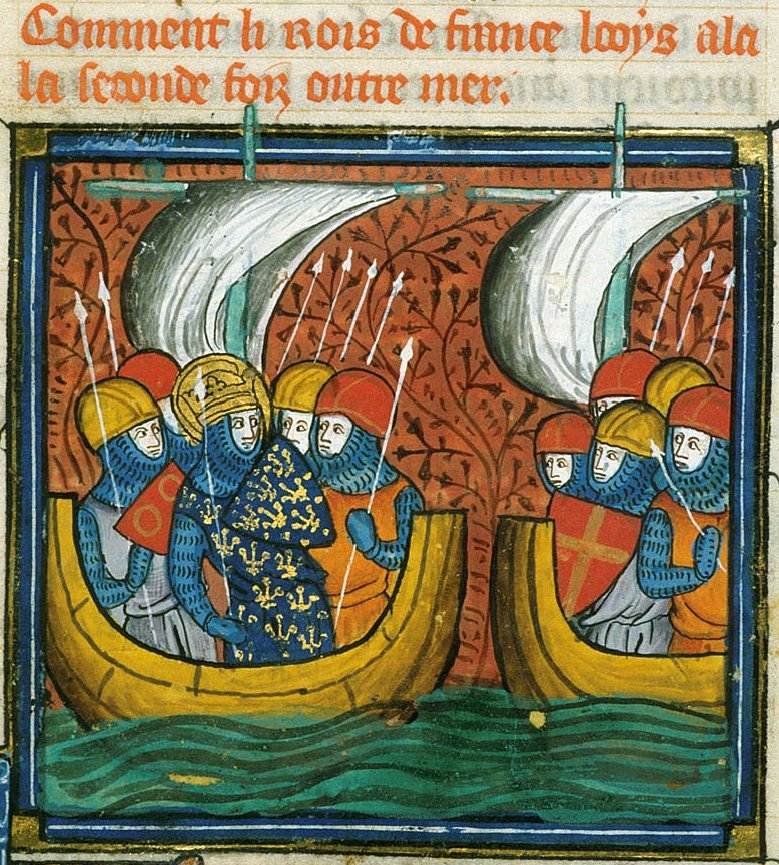
Florent, lord of Varennes, on the 2nd boat, with his shield "Gules a Cross Or", heading to the Crusade

In July 1270, King Louis IX set sail from Aigues-Mortes with a large, well-organized fleet of 70 vessels, mostly Genoese and Venetian, stating: "Already old, I begin the overseas journey. I sacrifice to God wealth, honor, pleasure ... I wanted to give you this last example and I hope you will follow it if circumstances dictate ..."

The first part of the journey was hectic. They stopped in Sardinia. The King sent Florent de Varennes as a scout towards the Sards. But, since their boats were Genoan, they were unwelcome. Food was delivered at high cost.

On July 17, the army arrived at the Tunisian coast. According to the royal secretary, Jean de Condé, the King sends Florent de Varennes with a few men to reconnoitre the land. He found an empty harbour, with only a few Muslim and Genoan merchant ships present. He sent a messenger to the King. The royal council was divided on which strategy to adopt: some thought it was a trap, while others wanted to take advantage of the situation and disembark. Florent de Varennes, without referring to the King, disembarks his troops on the platform closing Tunis harbour. Although he was furious, the King joined with the rest of the crew. The operation is a capharnaum, but hopefully, no enemy showed up.

On July 21, the tower of La Goulette was seized, and the army settled in the plain of Carthage. The Castle of Carthage was captured by Genoan sailors.

Waiting for the reinforcements of Charles of Anjou, King of Sicily, to attack Tunis, a dysentery epidemic decimated the troops, the polluted water and excessive heat not helping. Florent de Varennes and John Tristan, Count of Valois, son of Louis IX, were among the victims.

Louis IX himself died on August 25, by the time of the arrival of Charles of Anjou. The latter defeated the Saracens and signed a treaty with the Sultan on 30 October 1270. Philip, Count of Orléans, Louis' elder son, who became King Philip III of France, sailed home on November 11.

== Heraldry ==
Florent's coat of arms was "Gules a Cross Or" (Red with a golden cross) and is still the coat of arms of the village of Varennes, Departement of the Somme, Region Picardy
