= Fernando Sánchez de Castro =

Aragonese infante (royal prince), crusader and rebel leader

Fernando Sánchez (Note: His name is also spelled Fernán Sánchez (Elipe Soriano 2013), Ferrand Sanchez (Dunbabin 1998), Ferran Sanchis (Kagay 1988) and Ferran Sanxis de Castre (Ferrer i Mallol 1972).) de Castro (1241–1275) was an Aragonese infante (royal prince), crusader and rebel leader.

Fernando was an illegitimate son of King James I of Aragon by his mistress Blanca, daughter of Sancho de Antillón. Their relationship can be dated to 1241, when James gave her the castle of Castro. Fernando later took the title of baron of Castro.

In April 1261, Fernando and Guillem de Montgrí were sent to Naples as ambassadors to King Manfred of Sicily. As a result of this embassy, James's heir, the infante Peter, was married to Manfred's daughter, Constance. Fernando was a witness to their wedding on 13 June 1262 in Montpellier.

At the cortes of 1264 in Zaragoza, Fernando clashed with his father over the extension of the bovatge tax on livestock from Catalonia to Aragon. When the Aragonese nobility withdrew from the cortes, Fernando sided with them. He thereby gained enduring popularity with the nobility of Aragon and married a daughter of Ximeno II d'Urrea. Despite these clashes, Fernando remained a favourite of his father.

Fernando took part in the crusade to the Holy Land launched by his father on 4 September 1269. When his father diverted the fleet to Aigues-Mortes after a storm and opted to abandon the enterprise, Fernando and his half-brother, Pedro Fernández de Híjar, continued on to Acre. They and their followers were too few, however, to accomplish anything there. He may have made contact with King Charles I of Sicily during his return voyage from Acre.

In 1270 or 1271, (Note: Dunbabin 1998, p. 99, gives 1271, but on p. 171 she gives 1270. Hinojosa Montalvo 2018 merely places it between the crusade (1269) and the cortes (1272).) Fernando was in exile in Montpellier when Charles I offered to pay him 8,000 livres tournois and transport costs if he served him for a year in the defence of Trapani. He was to bring forty knights, four squires and twenty mounted crossbowmen, but he did not accept the offer.

In February 1272, James convoked a cortes in Lleida for the following the month to resolve the differences between Fernando and the infante Peter, but the only result was a break between the king and his heir, who accused Fernando of seeking to dethrone their father. In December 1273, James and Peter were reconciled, and the latter pledged not to harm Fernando.

The reconciliation of Fernando with his father and brother did not last long. He continued to side openly with the rebellious Aragonese nobility. In 1273, Peter accused him of and the barons of plotting treason. In September 1274, James declared him a traitor. The king offered a truce to all who attended his cortes in Lleida in March 1275, but no final agreement was reached there. By this time James had turned completely against his son. In a letter dated 29 March, James asks Peter to "do evil" to Fernando and his allies, Lope Ferrench III de Luna and Ximeno III d'Urrea. James attacked Count Hugh V of Empúries, while in May Peter led an army against Antillón. On 1 June, Peter laid siege to Fernando in the castle of Pomar. He tried to escape disguised as a squire, but he was captured. Peter ordered him drowned in the river Cinca. James, in his autobiographical Llibre dels fets, says that "this greatly pleased us when he heard of it, because it was a very serious thing that he, being our son, had risen against us, after we had done him so much good and given him so noble an inheritance."
