= Treaty of Tunis =

1270 treaty between the Crusaders and Hafasids

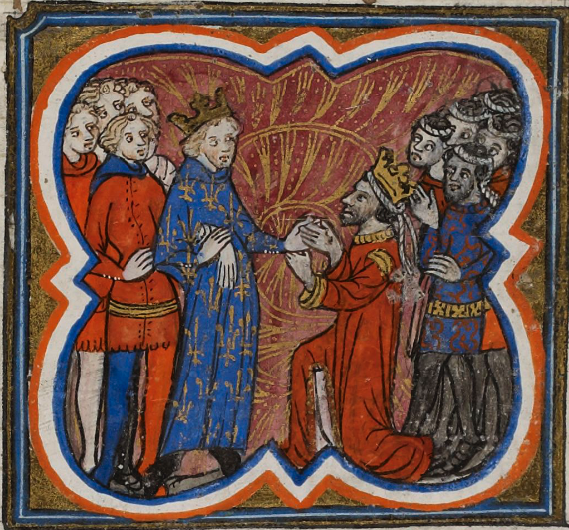
French miniature of Muhammad I al-Mustansir paying homage to Philip III of France after the Treaty of Tunis.

The Treaty of Tunis was an agreement during the Eighth Crusade. It was signed in November 1270 between the Hafsid Sultan Muhammad I al-Mustansir and Crusaders shortly after Louis IX of France's death. The treaty guaranteed a truce between the two armies. The treaty was quite beneficial to Charles of Anjou, who received one-third of a war indemnity from the Tunisians, and was promised that Hohenstaufen refugees in the sultanate would be expelled. During this treaty, the parties agreed on cessation of hostilities, the release of captives, security for businessmen, the freedom of missionaries to propagate Christianity and build churches in Tunisia, annual ransom payment by the Hafsids, and others.
