= Isabella of France, Queen of Navarre =

Queen of Navarre from 1258 to 1270

Isabella of France
- Isabella's seal as queen (1255)

Queen consort of Navarre Countess consort of Champagne
- Tenure: 1258–1270
- Born: 2 March 1241
- Died: 17 April 1271 (aged 30); Provence, France
- Burial: Provins, France
- Spouse: Theobald II of Navarre (m. 1255; died 1270)
- House: Capet
- Father: Louis IX of France
- Mother: Margaret of Provence

Isabella of France (2 March 1241 – 17 April 1271) was Queen of Navarre by marriage to Theobald II of Navarre, a daughter of Louis IX of France and Margaret of Provence.

== Life ==
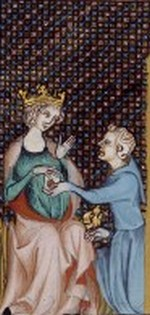
Isabella receiving a messenger from her father

At the All Saints Parlement in 1254, Theobald of Navarre requested Isabella's hand in marriage. In an attempt to resolve the inheritance of Navarre, Louis declined Theobald's request until he reconciled with his sister, Blanche of Brittany. Upon the reconciliation, Louis agreed to Isabella marrying Theobald. The Archbishop of Rouen celebrated the marriage between Isabella and Theobald II, King of Navarre and Count of Champagne, on 6 April 1255 in Melun. Isabelle became Queen consort of Navarre.

Together with her husband and her father, the very pious Isabella travelled with the Eighth Crusade in July 1270. Her father died there in August of the same year. Then, in December, Isabella's husband died of an epidemic while in Sicily. After the deaths of both her father and husband, Isabella returned to France and lived in Provence until her death only two months later in 1271.

Isabella is buried next to her husband in Provins.

== Sources ==
- Ashley, Kathleen (2009). "The French Enseignemenz a Phelippe and Enseignement a Ysabel of Saint Louis". In Johnston, Mark D. (ed.). Medieval Conduct Literature: An Anthology of Vernacular Guides to Behaviour for Youths, with English Translations. The Medieval Academy of America. pp. 3–22. ISBN 978-0-8020-9832-0.
- Evergates, Theodore (2010). Aristocratic Women in Medieval France. University of Pennsylvania Press.
- Hallam, Elizabeth (1980). Capetian France: 987-1328. Longman Group Limited.
- Jordan, William C. (2017). "A Border Policy? Louis IX and the Spanish Connection". In Liang, Yuen-Gen; Rodriguez, Jarbel (eds.). Authority and Spectacle in Medieval and Early Modern Europe: Essays in Honor of Teofilo F. Ruiz. Routledge.
- Richard, Jean (1983). Lloyd, Simon (ed.). Saint Louis: Crusader King of France. Translated by Birrell, Jean. Cambridge University Press.

Isabella of France, Queen of Navarre Capetian dynasty Born: 2 March 1241 Died: 17 April 1271
Royal titles
Preceded by Margaret of Bourbon	Queen consort of Navarre; Countess consort of Champagne; 1258–1270	Succeeded by Blanche of Artois
