= Jayme Alaric de Perpignan =

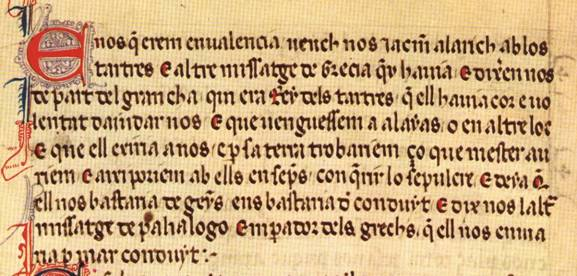
Excerpt from the book "Llibre dels fets" of James I, where he talks about an embassy sent to the great khan by means of Jayme Alaric, with two Mongol ambassadors returning to his court: E nós que érem en ualencia uench-nos Jacme Alarich ab los tartres e altre missatge de Grècia que y havia, e dixeren-nos de part del gran cha, qui era Rei dels tartres, que ell hauia cor e volentat d'ajudar-nos, e que venguéssem a alayas o en altre loc e que ell eixiria a nós, e per sa terra trobaríem ço que mester auríem e així poríem ab ells ensems conquerir lo Sepulcre. E deïa que ell nos bastaria de "genys", e ens bastaria de conduit. E dix-nos l'altre missatge de Palialogo, emperador dels grechs, que ell nos enviaria per mar conduit

Jayme Alaric de Perpignan was an ambassador sent by Pope Clement IV and James I of Aragon to the Mongol ruler Abaqa Khan in 1267.

The Byzantine Emperor Michael VIII Palaiologos had sent his illegitimate daughter Maria Palaiologina to be the bride of Hulagu Khan, Abaqa's predecessor. Hulagu died before she arrived, and she was thus wed instead to Abaqa. She became a popular religious figure to the Mongols, who had previously looked to Doquz Khatun, Hulagu's wife, as a religious leader. After the death of Doquz, this sentiment turned to Maria, who was called "Despina Khatun".

Clement and James had been encouraged by this, towards the possibility that the Mongols might join the Europeans in a Franco-Mongol alliance against the Muslims. From Viterbo in 1267, they sent a letter, carried by Jayme Alaric de Perpignan. It was responding positively to previous messages from the Mongols, and informed Abaqa of the upcoming Crusade (the Eighth Crusade).

The kings of France and Navarre, taking to heart the situation in the Holy Land, and decorated with the Holy Cross, are readying themselves to attack the enemies of the Cross. You wrote to us that you wished to join your father-in-law (the Greek emperor Michael VIII Palaiologos) to assist the Latins. We abundantly praise you for this, but we cannot tell you yet, before having asked to the rulers, what road they are planning to follow. We will transmit to them your advice, so as to enlighten their deliberations, and will inform your Magnificence, through a secure message, of what will have been decided.

— 1267 letter from Pope Clement IV to Abagha

However, Abaqa was distracted by wars with other sections of the Mongol Empire, and would only make vague promises of assistance.

Jayme Alaric would return to Europe in 1269, accompanied by a Mongol embassy.

== See also ==
- Franco-Mongol alliance
