= Lancelot de Saint-Maard =

Crusader and Marshal of France

Lancelot de Saint-Maard (died 1278) was the fourteenth marshal of France at the time of the Eighth Crusade in 1270.

== Eighth Crusade ==
Lancelot followed Louis IX to Africa with five knights in that year. He distinguished himself in the assault on Carthage. He conducted the siege and led the charge. During a mêlée, his helm was broken and he was saved by his fellow great officer Imbert de Beaujeu, the constable of France.
