= Pedro Fernández de Híjar =

Spanish noble

Coat of arms of the barons of Híjar (1268), descendants of James I of Aragon.

Pedro Fernández de Híjar (1245/49-1299) was the first Baron of Híjar, and knight of Order of the Holy Sepulchre. He was the illegitimate son of King James I of Aragon, and Berenguela Fernández (m. 1272).

He took part in the crusade of 1269.

== Bibliography ==
- Arco y Garay, Ricardo del (1945). Sepulcros de la Casa Real de Aragón. Madrid: Instituto Jerónimo Zurita. Consejo Superior de Investigaciones Científicas. OCLC 11818414.
- Casaus Ballester, María José (2004). "Acumulación de posesiones y títulos nobiliarios de la Casa de Híjar (Teruel). Siglos XIII-XVIII" (PDF). Artículo disponible en formato PDF en el Archivo Ducal de Híjar, archivo abierto. I. Zaragoza: Anales de la Real Academia Matritense de heráldica y genealogía. Homenaje a Don Faustino Menéndez Pidal: 213–250. Archived from the original (PDF) on 2013-11-05.
- Casaus Ballester, María José (2008). "Los Pedro Fernández de Híjar y el espíritu cruzado entre los siglos XIII y XIV". Artículo disponible en formato word en el Archivo Ducal de Híjar, archivo abierto (XX). Zaragoza: Universidad de Zaragoza: 187–292. Archived from the original on 2013-11-05.
