= James I of Aragon =

King of Aragon from 1213 to 1276

James I
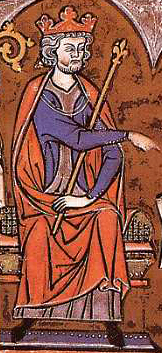
- Miniature depiction of James from Vidal Mayor, c. 1290–1310

King of Aragon Count of Barcelona
- Reign: 12 September 1213 – 27 July 1276
- Predecessor: Peter II
- Successor: Peter III
- Born: 2 February 1208; Montpellier
- Died: 27 July 1276 (aged 68); Valencia, Kingdom of Valencia
- Burial: Poblet Monastery
- Spouses: Eleanor of Castile (m. 1221; ann. 1229) Violant of Hungary (m. 1235; died 1251): Teresa Gil de Vidaure
- Issue among others...: Violant, Queen of Castile; Constance, Lady of Villena; Peter III, King of Aragon; James II, King of Majorca; Isabella, Queen of France
- House: Barcelona
- Father: Peter II of Aragon
- Mother: Maria of Montpellier

James I the Conqueror (Catalan: Jaume I or Jaume el Conqueridor; Aragonese: Chaime I o Conqueridor; 2 February 1208 – 27 July 1276) was the 11th King of Aragon, 38th Count of Barcelona, and Lord of Montpellier from 1213 to 1276; King of Majorca from 1231 to 1276; and King of Valencia from 1238 to 1276. His long reign of 62 years is not only the longest of any Iberian monarch, but one of the longest monarchical reigns in history, ahead of Hirohito of Japan but remaining behind Elizabeth II of Britain, Queen Victoria of Britain, Ferdinand I of the Two Sicilies, Bhumibol Adulyadej of Thailand, and King Louis XIV of France.

King James I saw the expansion of the Crown of Aragon in three directions: Languedoc to the north, the Balearic Islands to the southeast, and Valencia to the south. By a treaty with Louis IX of France, he achieved the renunciation of any possible claim of French suzerainty over the County of Barcelona and the other Catalan counties, while he renounced northward expansion and taking back the once Catalan territories in Occitania and vassal counties loyal to the County of Barcelona, lands that were lost by his father Peter II of Aragon in the Battle of Muret during the Albigensian Crusade and annexed by the Kingdom of France, and then decided to turn south. His great part in the Reconquista was similar in Mediterranean Spain to that of his contemporary Ferdinand III of Castile in Andalusia. One of the main reasons for this formal renunciation of most of the once Catalan territories in Languedoc and Occitania, and any expansion into them, is that he was raised by the Knights Templar Crusaders, who had defeated his father, who was fighting for the Pope alongside the French. It was thus effectively forbidden for him to try to maintain the traditional influence of the Count of Barcelona that previously existed in Occitania and Languedoc.

As a legislator and organiser, he occupies a high place among the European kings. King James I compiled the Llibre del Consolat de Mar, which governed maritime trade and helped establish Aragonese supremacy in the western Mediterranean. He was an important figure in the development of the Catalan language, sponsoring Catalan literature and writing a quasi-autobiographical chronicle of his reign: the Llibre dels fets.

== Early life and reign until majority ==
James was born at Montpellier as the only son of Peter II of Aragon and Marie of Montpellier. As a child, James was made a pawn in the power politics of Provence, where his father was engaged in struggles helping the Cathar heretics of Albi against the Albigensian Crusade led by Simon IV de Montfort, Earl of Leicester, who were trying to exterminate them. Peter endeavoured to placate the northern Crusaders by arranging a marriage between his two-year-old son James and Simon's daughter, Amicie de Montfort. He entrusted the boy to be educated in Montfort's care in 1211, but was soon forced to take up arms against him, dying at the Battle of Muret on 12 September 1213. Montfort would willingly have used James as a means of extending his own power had not the Aragonese appealed to Pope Innocent III, who insisted that Montfort surrender him. James was handed over to the papal legate Peter of Benevento at Carcassonne in May or June 1214.

James was then sent to Monzón, where he was entrusted to the care of Guillem de Montredó, the head of the Knights Templar in Aragon and Provence; the regency meanwhile fell to his great-uncle Sancho, Count of Roussillon, and his son, the king's cousin, Nuño. The kingdom was given over to confusion until, in 1217, the Templars and some of the more loyal nobles brought the young king to Zaragoza.

In 1221, he was married to Eleanor, daughter of Alfonso VIII of Castile. The next six years of his reign were full of rebellions on the part of the nobles. By the Peace of Alcalá of 31 March 1227, the nobles and the king came to terms.

== Acquisition of Urgell ==
In 1228, James faced the sternest opposition yet from a vassal. Guerau IV de Cabrera occupied the County of Urgell in opposition to Aurembiax, the heiress of Ermengol VIII, who had died without sons in 1208. Although Aurembiax's mother, Elvira, had made herself a protégée of James's father, upon her death in 1220 Guerau occupied the county and displaced Aurembiax, claiming that a woman could not inherit.

James intervened on behalf of Aurembiax, to whom he owed protection. He bought Guerau off and allowed Aurembiax to reclaim her territory, which she did at Lleida, probably also becoming one of James' earliest mistresses. She surrendered Lleida to James and agreed to hold Urgell in fief for him. On her death in 1231, James exchanged the Balearic Islands for Urgell with her widower, Peter of Portugal.

== Relations with France and Navarre ==
From 1230 to 1232, James negotiated with Sancho VII of Navarre, who desired his help against his nephew and closest living male relative, Theobald IV of Champagne. James and Sancho negotiated a treaty whereby James would inherit Navarre on the old Sancho's death, but when this occurred in 1234, the Navarrese nobles elevated Theobald to the throne instead, and James disputed it. Pope Gregory IX was required to intervene. In the end, James accepted Theobald's succession.

James endeavoured to form a state straddling the Pyrenees in order to counterbalance the power of France north of the river Loire. As with the much earlier Visigothic attempt, this policy was victim to physical, cultural, and political obstacles. As in the case of Navarre, he declined to launch into perilous adventures. By the Treaty of Corbeil, signed in May 1258, he ended his conflict with Louis IX of France, securing the renunciation of any historical French claims to sovereignty over Catalonia, including the County of Barcelona. On 17 July, James renounced his hereditary rights to the County of Provence (then an imperial fief) in favor of Margaret, daughter of his uncle Ramon Berenguer V. Margaret was the wife of Louis IX of France and hence Provence became officially part of France. Thus, as a result of the treaty the House of Barcelona was separated from the politics of southern France and the strong ties that had linked Catalonia and Languedoc faded.

== Reconquest ==
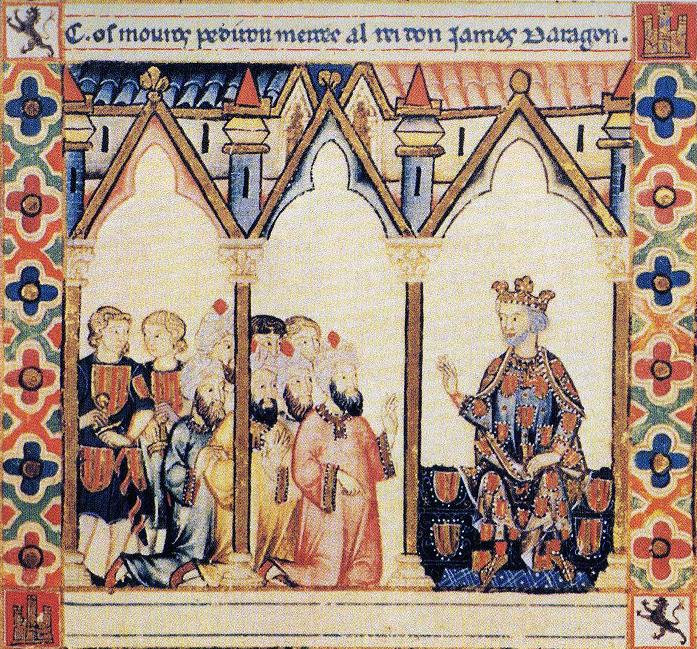
The Moors request permission from James I, taken from The Cantigas de Santa María

After his false start at uniting Aragon with the Kingdom of Navarre through a scheme of mutual adoption, James turned to the south and the Balearic Islands in the Mediterranean Sea. On 5 September 1229, the troops from Aragon, consisting of 155 ships, 1,500 horsemen and 15,000 soldiers, set sail from Tarragona, Salou, and Cambrils, in southern Catalonia, to conquer Majorca from Abu Yahya, the semi-independent Almohad governor of the island. Although a group of Aragonese knights took part in the campaign because of their obligations to the king, the conquest of Majorca was mainly a Catalan undertaking, and Catalans would later make up the majority of Majorca's settlers. James conquered Majorca on 31 December 1229, and Menorca (1232) and Ibiza (1235) were later acquired during the reconquest.

Valencia capitulated to Aragonese rule on 28 September 1238, following an extensive campaign that included the Siege of Burriana and the decisive Battle of the Puig, where the Aragonese commander, Bernat Guillem I d'Entença, who was also the king's cousin, died from wounds received in action. Chroniclers say James used gunpowder in the siege of Museros castle.

During his remaining two decades after Corbeil, James warred with the Moors in Murcia, on behalf of his son-in-law Alfonso X of Castile. On 26 March 1244, the two monarchs signed the Treaty of Almizra to establish their zones of expansion into Andalusia so as to prevent squabbling between them. Specifically, it defined the borders of the newly created Kingdom of Valencia. James signed it on that date, but Alfonso did not affirm it until much later. According to the treaty, all lands south of a line from Biar to Villajoyosa through Busot were reserved for Castile.

== Crusade of 1269 ==
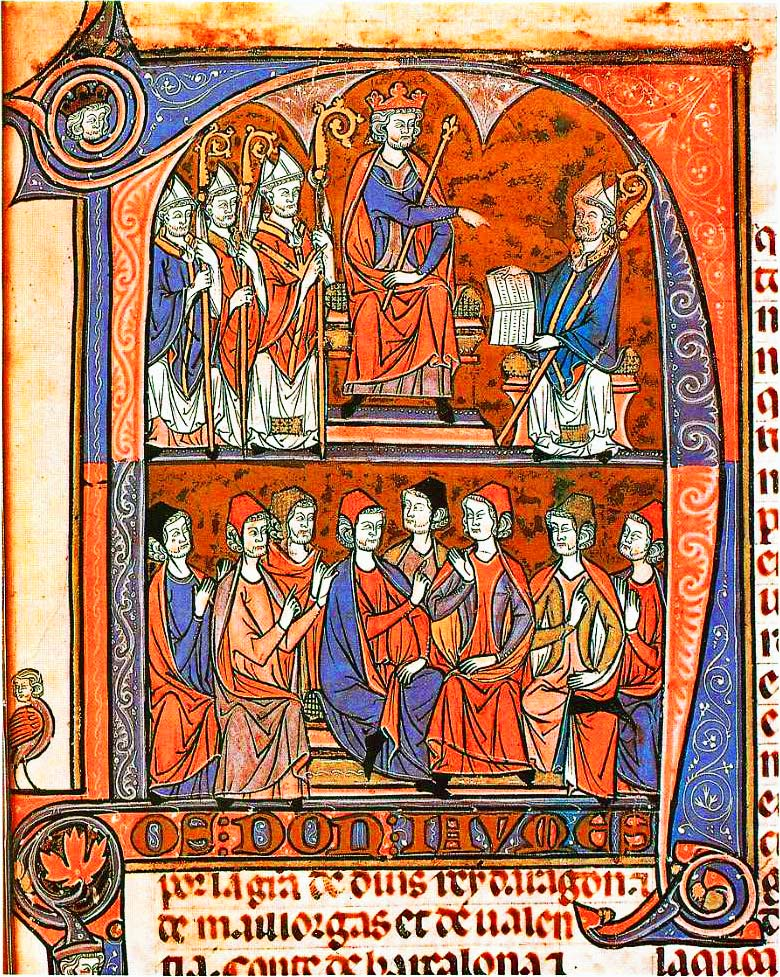
First compilation of the Fueros of Aragon, carried out by the bishop of Huesca Vidal de Canellas in 1247. Vidal Mayor.

Abaqa, the "Khan of Tartary" (actually the Ilkhan), corresponded with James in early 1267, inviting him to join forces with the Mongols and go on crusade. James sent an ambassador to Abaqa in the person of Jayme Alaric de Perpignan, who returned with a Mongol embassy in 1269. Pope Clement IV tried to dissuade James from crusading, regarding his moral character as sub-par, and Alfonso X did the same. Nonetheless, James, who was then campaigning in Murcia, made peace with Muhammad I, the Sultan of Granada, and set about collecting funds for a crusade. After organising the government for his absence and assembling a fleet at Barcelona in September 1269, he was ready to sail east. The troubadour Olivier lo Templier composed a song praising the voyage and hoping for its success. A storm, however, drove him off course, and he landed at Aigues-Mortes. According to the continuator of William of Tyre, he returned via Montpellier por l'amor de sa dame Berenguiere ("for the love of his lady Berengaria") and abandoned any further effort at a crusade.

James's sons Pedro Fernández and Fernán Sánchez, who had been given command of part of the fleet, did continue on their way to Acre, where they arrived in December. They found that Baibars, the Mameluke Sultan of Egypt, had broken his truce with the Kingdom of Jerusalem and was making a demonstration of his military power in front of Acre. During the demonstration, Egyptian troops hidden in the bushes ambushed a returning Frankish force that had been in Galilee. James's sons, initially eager for a fight, changed their minds after this spectacle and returned home via Sicily, where Fernán Sánchez was knighted by Charles of Anjou.

== Patronage of art, learning, and literature ==
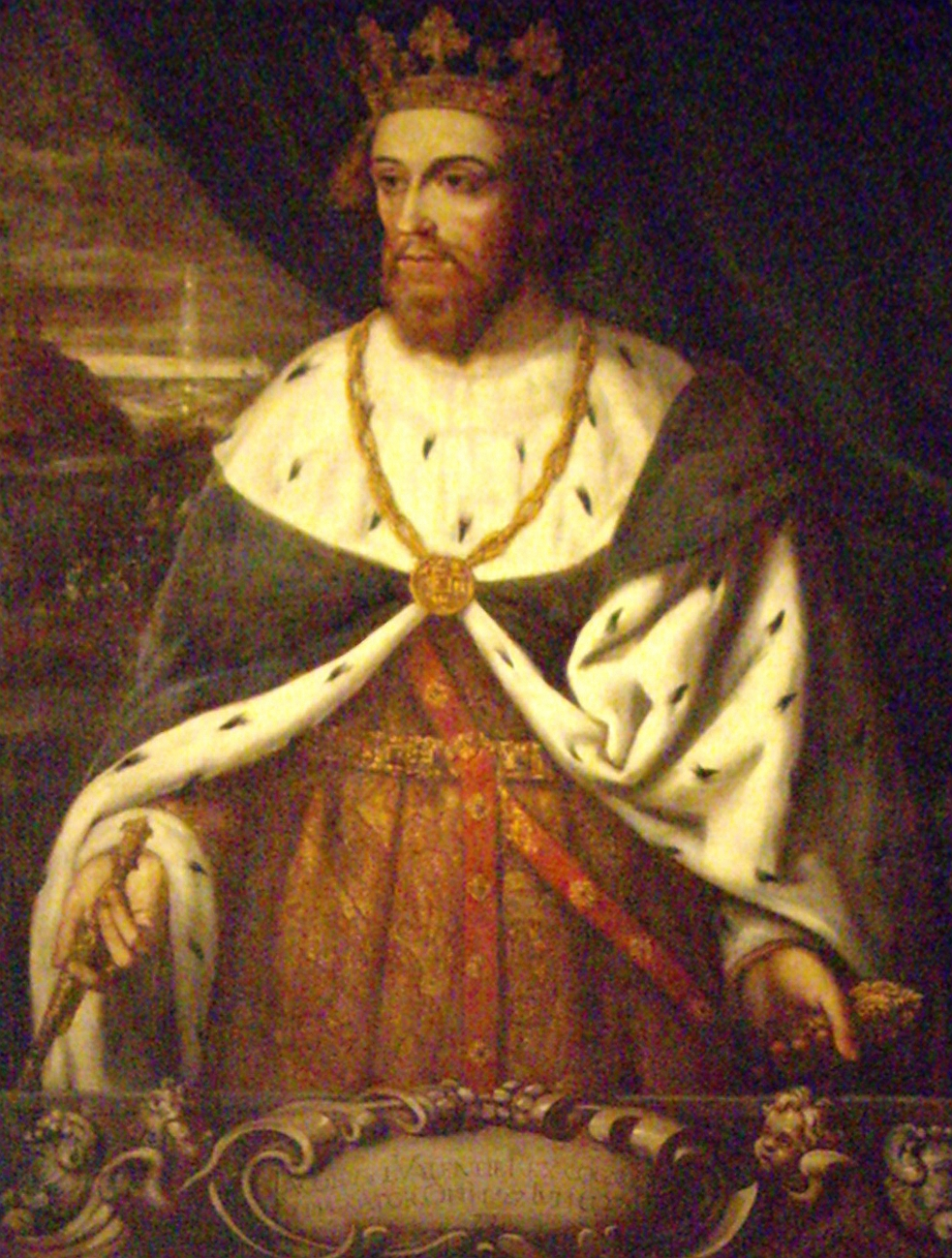
Posthumous portrait in the Generalitat Valenciana

James built and consecrated the Cathedral of Lleida, which was constructed in a style transitional between Romanesque and Gothic with little influence from Moorish styles.

James was a patron of the University of Montpellier, which owed much of its development to his impetus. He also founded a studium at Valencia in 1245 and received privileges for it from Pope Innocent IV, but it did not develop as splendidly. In 1263, James presided over The Barcelona Disputation, a debate between the Jewish rabbi Nahmanides and Pablo Christiani, a prominent converso.

James was the first great sponsor and patron of vernacular Catalan literature. Indeed, he may himself be called "the first of the Catalan prose writers." James wrote or dictated at various stages a chronicle of his own life in Catalan, Llibre dels fets, the first autobiography by a Christian king. As well as being a fine example of autobiography, the "Book of Deeds" expresses concepts of the power and purpose of monarchy, examples of loyalty and treachery in the feudal order, and medieval military tactics. More controversially, some historians have looked at these writings as a source of Catalan identity, separate from that of Occitania and Rome.

James also wrote the Libre de la Saviesa or "Book of Wisdom". The book contains proverbs from various authors, reaching from the time of King Solomon to nearly his own time with Albertus Magnus. It even contains maxims from the medieval Arab philosophers and from the Apophthegmata Philosophorum of Honein ben Ishak, which was probably translated at Barcelona during his reign. A Hebrew translator by the name of Jehuda was employed at James's court during this period.

Though James was himself a prose writer and sponsored mostly prose works, he had an appreciation of verse. In consequence of the Albigensian Crusade, many troubadours were forced to flee southern France and many found refuge in Aragon. Notwithstanding his early patronage of poetry, by the influence of his confessor Ramon de Penyafort, James brought the Inquisition into his realm in 1233 to prevent any vernacular translation of the Bible.

== Succession ==
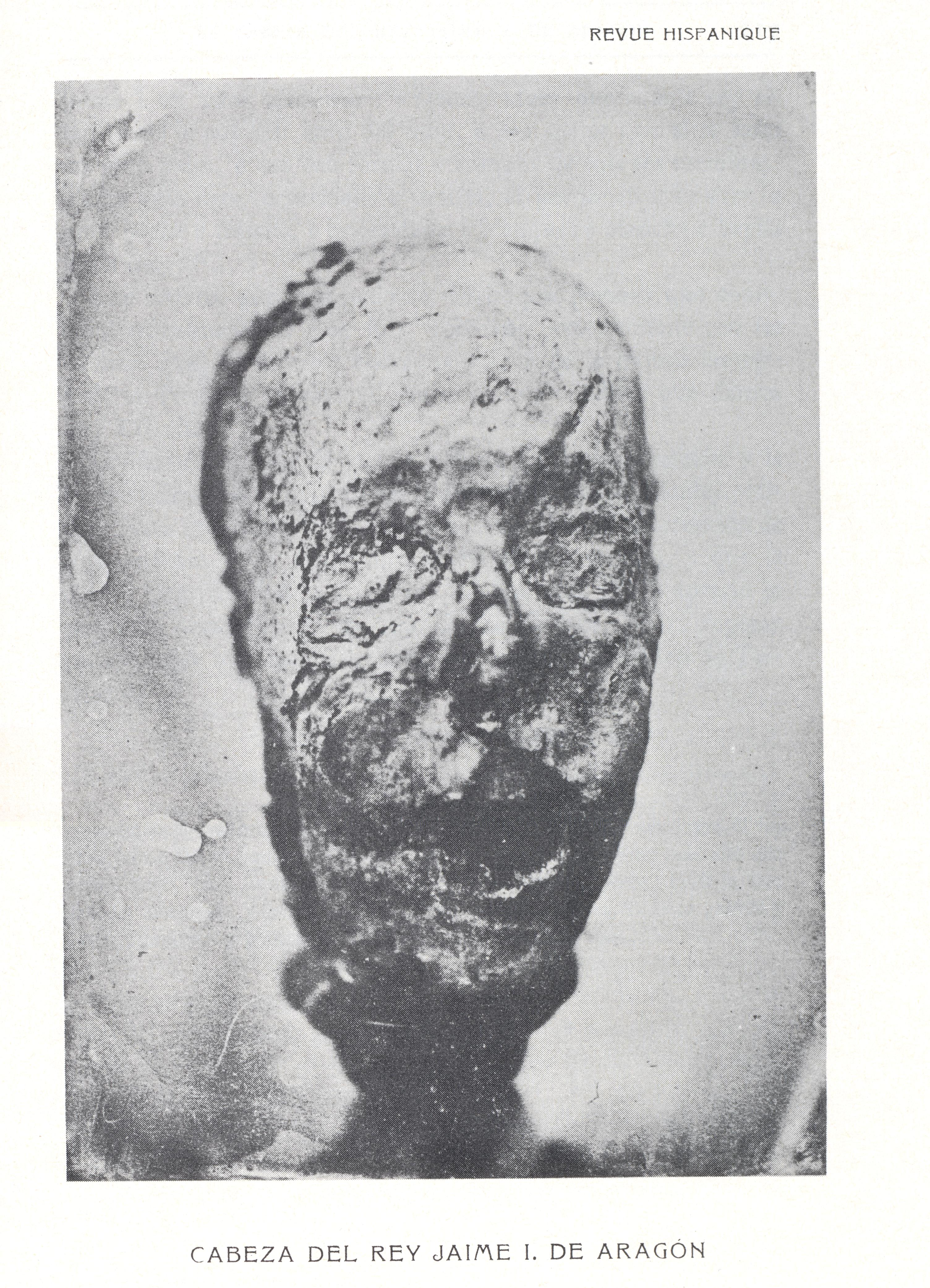
Mummified head of James, exhumed in 1856

The favour James showed his illegitimate offspring led to protest from the nobles, and to conflicts between his legitimate and illegitimate sons. When one of the latter, Fernán Sánchez, who had behaved with gross ingratitude and treason toward his father, was slain by the legitimate son Peter, the old king recorded his grim satisfaction.

In his will, James divided his states between his sons by Yolanda of Hungary: the aforementioned Peter received the Hispanic possessions on the mainland and James received the Kingdom of Majorca, which included the Balearic Islands, the counties of Roussillon and Cerdanya, and the Lordship of Montpellier. The division inevitably produced fratricidal conflicts. In 1276, the king fell very ill at Alzira and resigned his crown, intending to retire to the monastery of Poblet, but he died at Valencia on 27 July.

His mummified body was later exhumed in 1856, when the monastery was under repair. A photograph of the king was taken. The photograph of the head of the mummy clearly shows the wound in the left eyebrow that the king himself explained in a passage from his Llibre dels fets (Book of Deeds):

As I was coming with the men, I happened to turn my head towards the town in order to look at the Saracens, who had come out in great force, when a cross-bowman shot at me, and hit me beside the sun-hood, and the shot struck me on the head, the bolt lighting near the forehead. It was God's will it did not pass through the head, but the point of the arrow went half through it. In anger I struck the arrow so with my hand that I broke it: the blood came out down my face; I wiped it off with a mantle of "sendal" I had, and went away laughing, that the army might not take alarm.

== Marriages and children ==
James first married, in 1221, Eleanor, daughter of Alfonso VIII of Castile and Eleanor of England. Though he later had the marriage annulled, his one son by her was declared legitimate:

- Alfonso (1229–1260), married Constance of Béarn, Viscountess of Marsan

In 1235, James remarried to Yolanda, daughter of Andrew II of Hungary by his second wife Yolanda of Courtenay. They had numerous children:

- Yolanda, also known as Violant, (1236–1301), married Alfonso X of Castile
- Constance (1239–1269), married Manuel of Castile, son of Ferdinand III
- Peter III (1240–1285), successor in Aragon, Catalonia, and Valencia
- James II (1243–1311), successor in Balearics and Languedoc
- Ferdinand (1245–1250)
- Sancha (1246 – c. 1275), possible carer at the ospital de Acre, died in Acre.
- Isabella (1248–1271), married Philip III of France
- Maria (1248–1267), nun
- Sancho (1250–1275), Archbishop of Toledo
- Eleanor (born 1251, died young)

James married thirdly Teresa Gil de Vidaure, but only by a private document, and left her when (as he claimed) she developed leprosy.

- James (c. 1255–1285), lord of Xèrica
- Peter (1259–1318), lord of Ayerbe

The children in the third marriage were recognised in his last will as being in the line of succession to the throne, should the senior lines fail.

James also had several lovers, both during and after his marriages, and fathered several illegitimate sons.

By Blanca d'Antillón:

- Fernán Sánchez (or Fernando Sánchez) (1240–1275), Baron of Castro

By Berenguela Fernández, daughter of Alfonso of Molina:

- Pedro Fernández, Baron of Híjar

By Elvira Sarroca:

- Jaume Sarroca (born 1248), Bishop of Huesca from 1273 to 1290

== Sources ==
- Burns, Robert Ignatius (1973). Islam Under the Crusaders: Colonial Survival in the Thirteenth-Century Kingdom of Valencia. Princeton University Press. ISBN 9780691052076.
- Chaytor, H. J. A History of Aragon and Catalonia. London: Methuen, 1933.
- Linehan, Peter (2011). Spain, 1157–1300: A Particle Inheritance. Maldon: Wiley-Blackwell. ISBN 9780631172840.
- Luttrell, Anthony; Nicholson, Helen J. (2017). "Introduction: a Survey of Hospitaller Women in the Middle Ages". In Luttrell, Anthony; Nicholson, Helen J. (eds.). Hospitaller Women in the Middle Ages. Routledge. ISBN 9781351930376.
- Nicholson, Helen J. (2004). The Crusades. Greenwood Publishing Group. ISBN 978-0313326851. "James I of Aragon."
- Previté-Orton, Charles William; et al. (The Shorter Cambridge Medieval History) (1952). The Twelfth Century to the Renaissance. Vol. II. Cambridge: Cambridge at the University Press.
- The Book of Deeds of James I of Aragon. A translation of the medieval Catalan Libre dels fets. Trans. Damian Smith and Helen Buffery (Aldershot: Ashgate, 2003) (Crusade Texts in Translation, 10.) Pp. xvii + 405 incl. 5 maps.
- Chisholm, Hugh, ed. (1911). "James I. of Aragon" . Encyclopædia Britannica (11th ed.). Cambridge University Press.

James I of Aragon House of Barcelona Born: 2 February 1208 Died: 27 July 1276
Regnal titles
Preceded by Peter II	King of Aragon; Count of Barcelona; 1213–1276	Succeeded by Peter III
New title	King of Valencia; 1238–1276	Succeeded by Peter III
New title	King of Majorca; 1231–1276	Succeeded by James II
Preceded by Marie	Lord of Montpellier; 1219–1276	Succeeded by James II
