= Joinville (disambiguation) =

Joinville may refer to:

== Places ==
- Joinville, Santa Catarina, Brazil
- Joinville, Haute-Marne, a commune in Haute-Marne, France
- Joinville-le-Pont, a commune in the southeastern suburbs of Paris, France
- Joinville Islands, an Antarctic archipelago
  - Joinville Island, the largest island in that archipelago

== People ==
- List of lords and princes of Joinville
  - Guillaume de Joinville (died 1226), a French archbishop of Reims
  - Jean de Joinville (1225–1317), one of the great chroniclers of medieval France
  - François d'Orléans, Prince of Joinville (1818–1900), the third son of French king Louis Philippe I
- Princess of Joinville
  - Princess Francisca of Brazil, princess of Joinville (1824–1898)
- Giany Joinville (born 1984), a French professional football player

== Other ==
- Joinville Esporte Clube, Brazilian football team
- Joinville Studios, French film studios located in Paris
