= Guy II of Dampierre =

French feudatory (1174-1216)

- Lord of Dampierre
- The arms borne
- Reign: 1174–1216
- Predecessor: William I of Dampierre
- Successor: Archambaud of Dampierre; William II of Dampierre
- Other titles: constable of Champagne constable of Auvergne; Viscount of Troyes
- Born: c. 1155
- Died: 18 January 1216
- Noble family: House of Dampierre
- Spouse: Mathilde of Bourbon
- Issue: Archambaud of Dampierre; William II of Dampierre; Guy III of Dampierre; Philippa of Dampierre; Marie of Dampierre; Joan of Dampierre; Margaret of Dampierre
- Father: William I of Dampierre
- Mother: Ermengarde of Toucy

Guy II of Dampierre (died 18 January 1216) was constable of Champagne, and Lord of Dampierre, Bourbon and Montluçon. He was the only son of William I of Dampierre, Lord of Dampierre, and Ermengarde of Mouchy. William I of Dampierre was the son of Guy I, Lord of Dampierre and Viscount of Troyes, and Helvide de Baudémont.

Guy participated in the Third Crusade as a member of an advance party who initiated the Siege of Acre in the fall of 1189. His name and arms are in the Salles des Croisades of the Palace of Versailles

== Biography ==
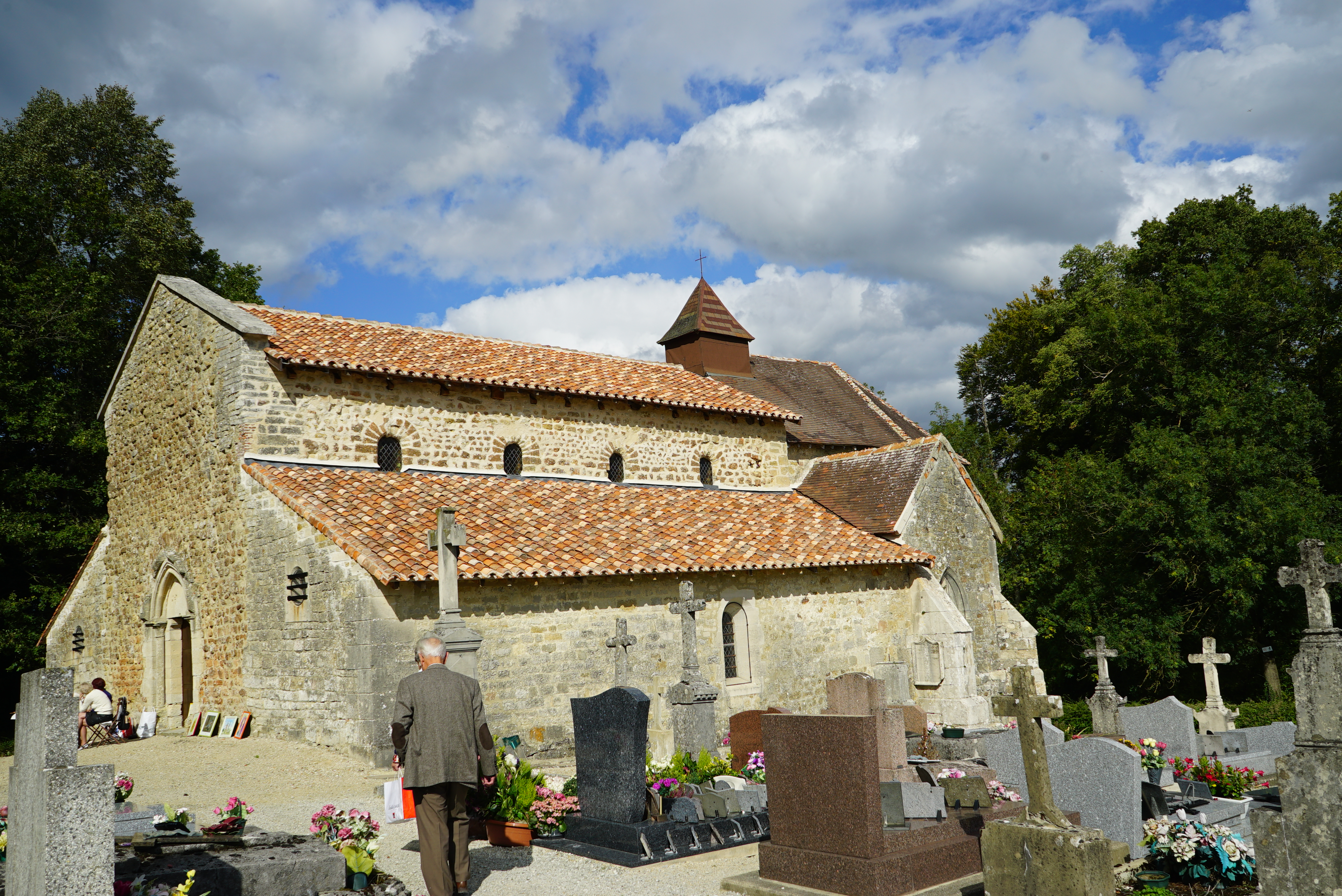
Castle chapel of Moëslains.

Guy was the eldest son of William I of Dampierre and Ermengarde of Toucy, lady of Champlay and daughter of Ithier III de Toucy and Elisabeth of Joigny.

During the lifetime of his father, Guy received the Lordship of Moëslains and maybe the viscounty of Troyes. During this time, he signed charters under the name of Guy de Moëslains.

Around 1174, Guy succeeded his father as Lord of Dampierre, Saint-Dizier and Saint-Just. Like his father before him, he is also named constable of Champagne, but this position was not hereditary.

In 1189, he participated in the Third Crusade as a member of an advance party who initiated the Siege of Acre in the fall of the year. After the departure of King Philip Augustus, he stayed in the Holy Land and fought at the Battle of Arsuf. He came back to Dampierre in late 1192. His name and arms are in the Salles des Croisades of the Palace of Versailles

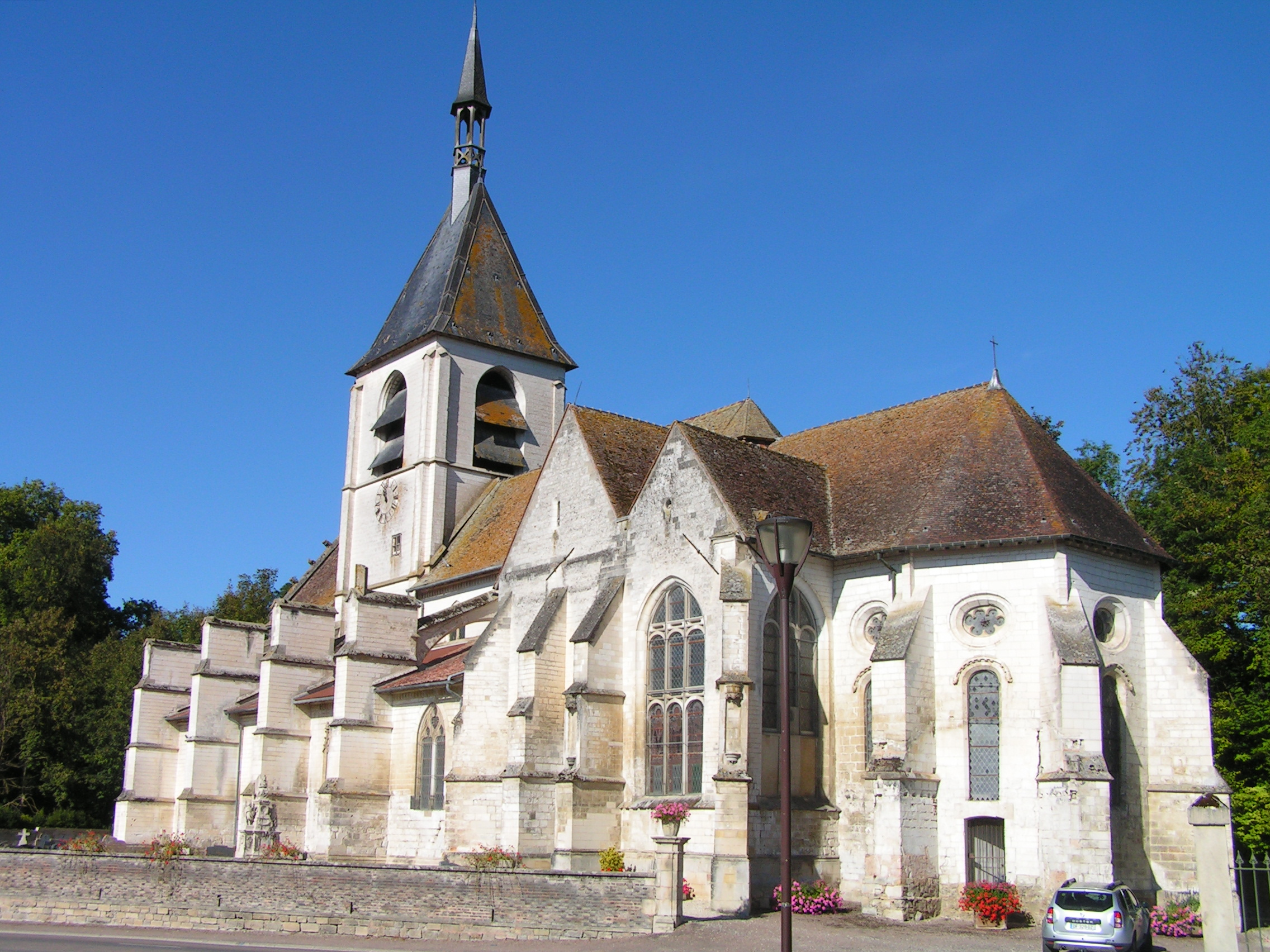
Church of Dampierre.

In 1194, Guy fought with Philip Augustus against the English and was at the battle of Fréteval in the rearguard that covered the escape of the King. In 1202, he participated in the conquest of Normandy and fought at the battle of Mirebeau, the siege of Château Gaillard and the catch of Falaise, Caen, Bayeux and Rouen.

In 1199, for service rendered, the King gave him the Lordship of Montluçon.

In 1210, Guy was sent at the head of a royal army sent by Philip Augustus to confiscate the lands of Count Guy II of Auvergne. He took Nonette, the castle of Tournoël and Riom in December 1213, and removed Guy of Auvergne from power. He was named by the King constable of Auvergne and managed the county for him.

Guy also fought at the battle of Bouvines and his participation was decisive in the French victory.

During the war of the Succession of Champagne, Guy supported the Countess-Regent Blanche of Navarre and her son Theobald against the pretender Erard of Brienne-Ramerupt and his wife Philippa of Champagne.

Guy died on 18 January 1216 and was buried in Saint-Laumer Abbey at Blois.

== Family ==
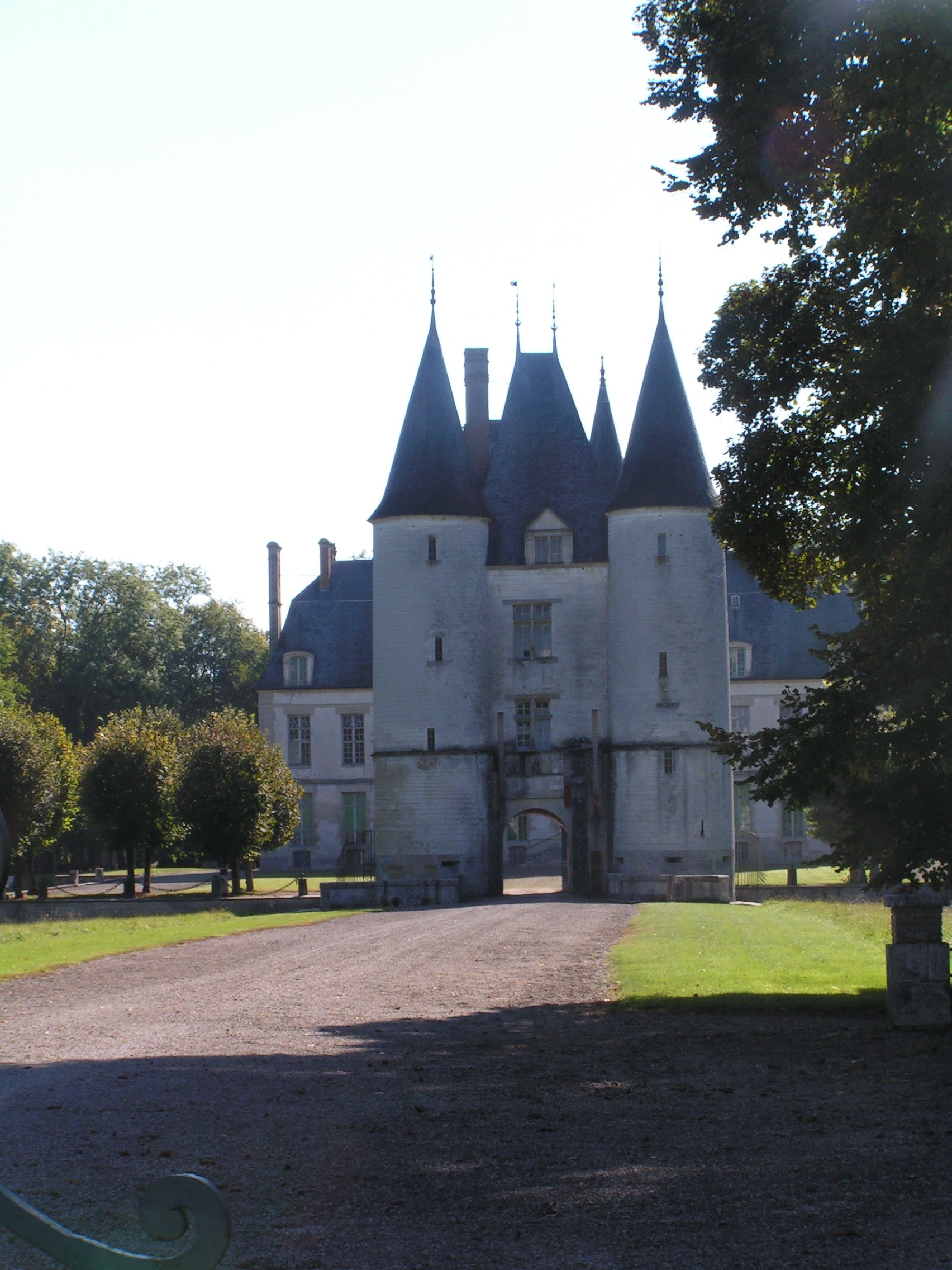
Castle of Dampierre.

In the year 1196 he married Mathilde of Bourbon, daughter of Archambaud de Bourbon and Alix of Burgundy, and had:

- Archambaud of Dampierre, Lord of Bourbon and Montluçon after his father's death.
- William II of Dampierre, Lord of Dampierre, Saint-Dizier and Moëslains, married Margaret II of Flanders
- Guy III of Dampierre, Lord of Saint-Just after his father's death.
- Philippa Mahaut of Dampierre, married in 1205 to Guigues IV, Count of Forez.
- Marie of Dampierre, married around 1201 to Hervé of Vierzon. Then widowed, she married secondly in 1220 to Henri I de Sully.
- Joan of Dampierre.
- Margaret of Dampierre.

== Sources ==
- d'Arbois de Jubainville, Henri (1865). Histoire des ducs et comtes de Champagne, tomes 4a et 4b. Paris: Librairie Auguste Durand.
- Devailly, Guy (1973). Le Berry, du X siecle au milieu du XIII (in French). Mouton & Co.
- Evergates, Theodore (2007). The Aristocracy in the County of Champagne, 1100-1300. University of Pennsylvania Press.
- Painter, Sidney (1969). "The Third Crusade:Richard the Lionhearted and Philip Augustus". In Setton, Kenneth M.; Wolff, Robert Lee; Hazard, Harry W. (eds.). The Later Crusades, 1189-1311. Vol. 2. University of Wisconsin Press.
- Savetiez, Charles (1884). Dampierre de l'Aube et ses seigneurs.
- Wolfe, Michael (2009). Walled Towns and the Shaping of France: From the Medieval to the Early Modern Era. Palgrave Macmillan.

Preceded by Archambaud VII de Bourbon	Lord of Bourbon; 1196–1216; With: his wife Mathilde of Bourbon	Succeeded by Archambaud of Dampierre
Preceded by -	Lord of Montluçon; 1199–1216	Succeeded by Archambaud of Dampierre
Preceded by William I of Dampierre	Lord of Dampierre, Saint-Dizier and Moëslains; 1174–1216	Succeeded by William II of Dampierre
Preceded by William I of Dampierre	Lord of Saint-Just; 1174–1216	Succeeded by Guy III of Dampierre
