= Geoffrey IV of Joinville =

Geoffrey IV (died August 1190), called the Younger (French Geoffroy le Jeune), was the Lord of Joinville from 1188 until his death on the Third Crusade two years later. He is surnamed Valet by Alberic of Trois-Fontaines.

== Family ==
Geoffrey was the only son of Geoffrey III the Old and his wife, Felicity (Félicité) of Brienne. His mother's first husband, Simon I of Broyes, died sometime before 1132 and Geoffrey was born to her second marriage before 1141. By 1179, he was assisting his elderly father in the government of Joinville. In Geoffrey III's last years, his son seems to have been exercising the lordship in his father's name. He succeeded to it only on his father's death in 1188.

Sometime before his accession, Geoffrey married Héluis (Helvide), a daughter of the crusader Guy I of Dampierre. They had six sons and two daughters, all listed by Alberic of Trois-Fontaines. The order of the sons is their birth order:

- Geoffrey V le Trouillard (died c. 1204), succeeded as lord of Joinville, was an adult in 1188
- Robert, lord of Sailly by 1201, accompanied Walter III of Brienne on the Fourth Crusade, but died in Apulia en route to the Holy Land, in 1203; was succeeded in Sailly by his brother Simon
- William (died 1226), archdeacon of Châlons (1191), bishop of Langres (1208) and archbishop of Reims (1219)
- Simon (died 1233), succeeded as lord of Sailly in 1203 and as lord of Joinville in 1204
- Guy, became lord of Sailly after Simon inherited Joinville in 1204
- Andrew, who became a Knight Templar
- Felicity (fl. 1195–1237), married Pierre de Bourlémont
- Yolanda (died 1233), married Ralph, Count of Soissons

== Lordship ==
The arms of the house of Broyes, which were also those of Joinville because of Geoffrey's mother

While his father had been seneschal of the county of Champagne, an office later hereditary in the Joinville family, it is not clear if Geoffrey IV inherited this office. There is no record either in his own charters or those of the count of him as seneschal.

In his first recorded act, in 1188, Geoffrey recognised the collegiate church of Saint-Laurent in Joinville as his family's particular chapel and renounced for himself and his descendants the right to construct a chapel in the castle of Joinville. This charter was witnessed by his wife and his children. The future Geoffrey V is identified as the (uterine) brother of Hugh III of Broyes. The close relationship between the Joinville and Broyes families explains the similarity of their coats of arms.

In 1189, Geoffrey, with the consent of his two eldest sons, granted his vineyard at Mussey to the abbey of Saint-Urbain in return for mass being said for his father every year on the anniversary of his death. He also confirmed his father's donation for the founding of the priory of Saint-Jacques. At the same time, he granted the tithes of Charmes-en-l'Angle, to which he had right, to establish a prebend at Saint-Laurent for saying annual masses for himself and Héluis and for two masters: Acelin, teacher of his son William, and a certain Constant.

Later that year, Geoffrey settled a dispute between the men of Vaucouleurs, a castle town belonging to Joinville, and the abbey of Vaux en Ornois over a meadow. He also settled his own dispute with the priory of Notre-Dame of Val d'Osne by admitting he was in the wrong to set up a mill that put Notre-Dame's out of business. He paid generous compensation.

== Crusade and death ==
The various religious acts undertaken in 1188 and 1189 were made in preparation for the Third Crusade, which Count Henry II of Champagne had vowed to join. According to Guy of Bazoches, a cleric from Champagne, Geoffrey was among those nobles of Champagne who, tired of Henry's delays, left on their own for the Holy Land. According to Ernoul, he joined the army of the French king, Philip Augustus.

Geoffrey was accompanied on the crusade by his eldest son. He arrived during the siege of Acre, before the battle of 4 October 1189, when André of Brienne, who had left Champagne with him, was killed. He died during the siege in August 1190, evidently of illness or a festering wound, since he had the time to settle his last disputes with the church. The month of his death is supplied by a 14th-century epitaph written by his grandson, John of Joinville, for his father, Geoffrey III, who was buried in the abbey of Clairvaux.

As his last acts, Goffrey ceded some land at La Blaise to the abbey of Montier-en-Der, and a cottage at Landéville to Saint-Urbain. These acts record the leading members of the retinue he took with him: his chaplain Dreu and the knights Hugues de Landricourt, Raoul de Dommartin, Eudes de Vaucouleurs, Étienne de la Côte and Hugues de Colombey, all of whom held fiefs of Joinville.

During Geoffrey's absence, his lordship was governed by Héluis. She was still living in 1195.

== Sources ==
- Delaborde, Henri-François (1894). Jean de Joinville et les seigneurs de Joinville, suivi d'un catalogue de leurs actes. Paris: Picard et fils.
- Longnon, Jean (1978). Les compagnons de Villehardouin: Recherches sur les croisés de la quatrième croisade. Geneva: Librairie Droz.
