= Geoffrey V of Joinville =

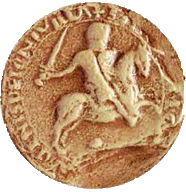
Seal of Geoffrey V from about 1193

Geoffrey V (French: Geoffroy), nicknamed le Trouillard, was the Lord of Joinville from 1190 until his death in late 1203 or early 1204. He was also the hereditary seneschal of the County of Champagne. He went on both the Third Crusade (1189–90) and the Fourth Crusade (1202–04), where he died.

Geoffrey was the eldest son of Geoffrey IV of Joinville and Héluis (Helvide), a daughter of Guy I of Dampierre. His maternal grandfather had gone on a crusade in 1125. In 1189, Geoffrey accompanied his father on the Third Crusade. He was praised in the Bible of Guyot de Provins: "Who was Geoffrey of Joinville? By Saint Giles, they do not have a better knight than him that side of the Punta del Faro." His prowess was such that King Richard I of England, a leader of the Third Crusade, as a mark of favor gave him the right to marshall his family's arms with those of England. His father died in at the siege of Acre in August 1190.

Geoffrey was present at the wedding of Count Theobald III and Blanche of Navarre in Chartres on 1 July 1199, where he signed Theobald's act granting a dower to Blanche. In the week after Theobald's death (24 May 1201), Geoffrey was at Sens when Blanche rendered homage to King Philip II for Champagne on behalf of the child she was bearing, the future Theobald IV.

Following the death of Theobald, who had taken a vow to go on a crusade, Geoffrey of Joinville joined Geoffrey of Villehardouin, Matthew II of Montmorency and Simon IV of Montfort-l'Amaury approached Duke Odo III of Burgundy, asking him to fulfill Theobald's vow and lead a crusade. Odo refused, and Geoffrey was nominated to make the same request to Count Theobald I of Bar, who also refused.

The arms borne by Geoffrey V of Joinville

Later in 1201, in preparation for his own crusade, Geoffrey made gifts to the Abbey of Clairvaux, the church of Saint-Laurent in Joinville and the men of Watrignéville subject to the Abbey of Saint-Urbain, which was a neighbour of Joinville. In the last two of these donations, he makes explicit reference to his intention to go to Jerusalem and visit the Holy Sepulchre. His presence with the main crusader army, however, is unrecorded. Geoffrey of Villehardouin in his account make no mention of the lord of Joinville after the failed negotiation with the count of Bar. He does not name him as one of the crusaders who split from the main army at Piacenza and went to Syria via the ports of Apulia, although it is possible he did go this route. His younger brother Robert, lord of Sailly, who was in Champagne preparing for his crusade in 1201, joined the army of Walter III, Count of Brienne, but died in Apulia en route in 1203.

Geoffrey did reach Syria. According to Alberic of Trois-Fontaines, "Geoffrey, the eldest born [son of Geoffrey IV], nicknamed Trullardus, a most famous knight, wearing the sign of the cross, crossed the sea and after many feats there he died."

Geoffrey died at Krak des Chevaliers in late 1203 or early 1204 and was buried in the chapel there. Since he had no children, he was succeeded by his younger brother, Simon. His shield hung in the chapel of Krak des Chevaliers alongside those of other crusaders until, fifty years later during the Seventh Crusade, probably in 1253–54, his nephew John retrieved his shield and brought it back to hang in the church of Saint-Laurent in Joinville. It was still hanging there as late as 1544, when it was stolen by some German mercenaries during the Italian War of 1542–46.

The nickname Trullardus or Trouillart, is attested in the lengthy epitaph written in 1311 by Geoffrey's nephew John of Joinville for the tomb of his great-grandfather and Geoffrey's grandfather, Geoffrey III (died 1188), in Clairvaux. The epitaph contains a genealogy of the family, including "Joffroy Troulart, who was lord of Joinville". Its meaning is unknown, but was not terribly uncommon in Champagne, for several members of the Villehardouin family carried it. A legend dating at least to 1498 and current at the court of Duke René II of Lorraine states that he obtained his nickname from having killed a Genoese pirate with a trouille, perhaps a fishing spear.

== Sources ==
- Delaborde, Henri-François (1894). Jean de Joinville et les seigneurs de Joinville, suivi d'un catalogue de leurs actes. Paris: Picard et fils.
- Folda, Jaroslav (2005). Crusader Art in the Holy Land, From the Third Crusade to the Fall of Acre, 1187–1291. Cambridge University Press.
- Longnon, Jean (1978). Les compagnons de Villehardouin: Recherches sur les croisés de la quatrième croisade. Geneva: Librairie Droz.
- Kennedy, Hugh (1994). Crusader Castles. Cambridge University Press. ISBN 9780521420686.
- Smith, Caroline (2006). Crusading in the Age of Joinville. Ashgate.
