= Simon of Joinville =

French feudatory (1204-1233)

- Lord of Joinville; Seneschal of Champagne
- The arms borne
- Reign: 1204–1233
- Predecessor: Geoffrey V of Joinville
- Successor: Jean of Joinville
- Born: c. 1175
- Died: May 1233
- Noble family: House of Joinville
- Spouses: Ermengarde of Montclair; Beatrix of Auxonne
- Issue: Geoffrey of Joinville; Isabelle of Joinville; Béatrix of Joinville; Jean of Joinville; Geoffrey of Joinville; Simon of Joinville; William of Joinville; Marie/Simonette of Joinville; Héloïse of Joinville
- Father: Geoffrey IV of Joinville
- Mother: Helvide of Dampierre

Simon of Joinville (French: Simon de Joinville; Latin: Symon de Jovisvillæ) was a French knight, who became the Lord of Joinville from 1204 until his death in 1233. He was also the hereditary seneschal of the County of Champagne.

== Biography ==
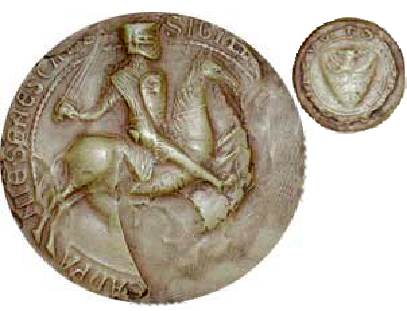
Seal of Simon of Joinville

Simon was the fourth son of Geoffrey IV of Joinville and Helvide of Dampierre, a daughter of Guy I of Dampierre.

Simon succeeded his eldest brother Geoffrey V as lord of Joinville, who died without children at Krak des Chevaliers in late 1203 or early 1204 during the Fourth Crusade.

In 1209, he participated in the initial campaign of the Albigensian Crusade, and after the fall of Carcassonne he came back to Joinville. (Note: Smith states Simon's involvement in the Albigensian Crusade was short since Simon returned to Champagne by mid-1210.)

In the war of the Succession of Champagne, he fought for his cousin Erard of Brienne-Ramerupt and his wife Philippa of Champagne against the countess-regent Blanche of Navarre and her son Theobald, because the hereditary office of seneschal was not appointed by Blanche. Blanche's forces ravaged the lands of Joinville, and she imposed a humiliating surrender agreement: Simon's fortresses were seized, his eldest son Geoffroy was taken hostage, and he was forced to transfer his ancestral castle at Joinville to his brother, Bishop William, as security for his good conduct.

Then, in 1218, he participated in the Fifth Crusade with his cousin, the king of Jerusalem, John of Brienne. He fought in the Siege of Damietta and was back in Champagne in September 1220.

Simon of Joinville died on May 1233 and was buried in Clairvaux Abbey.

== Family ==
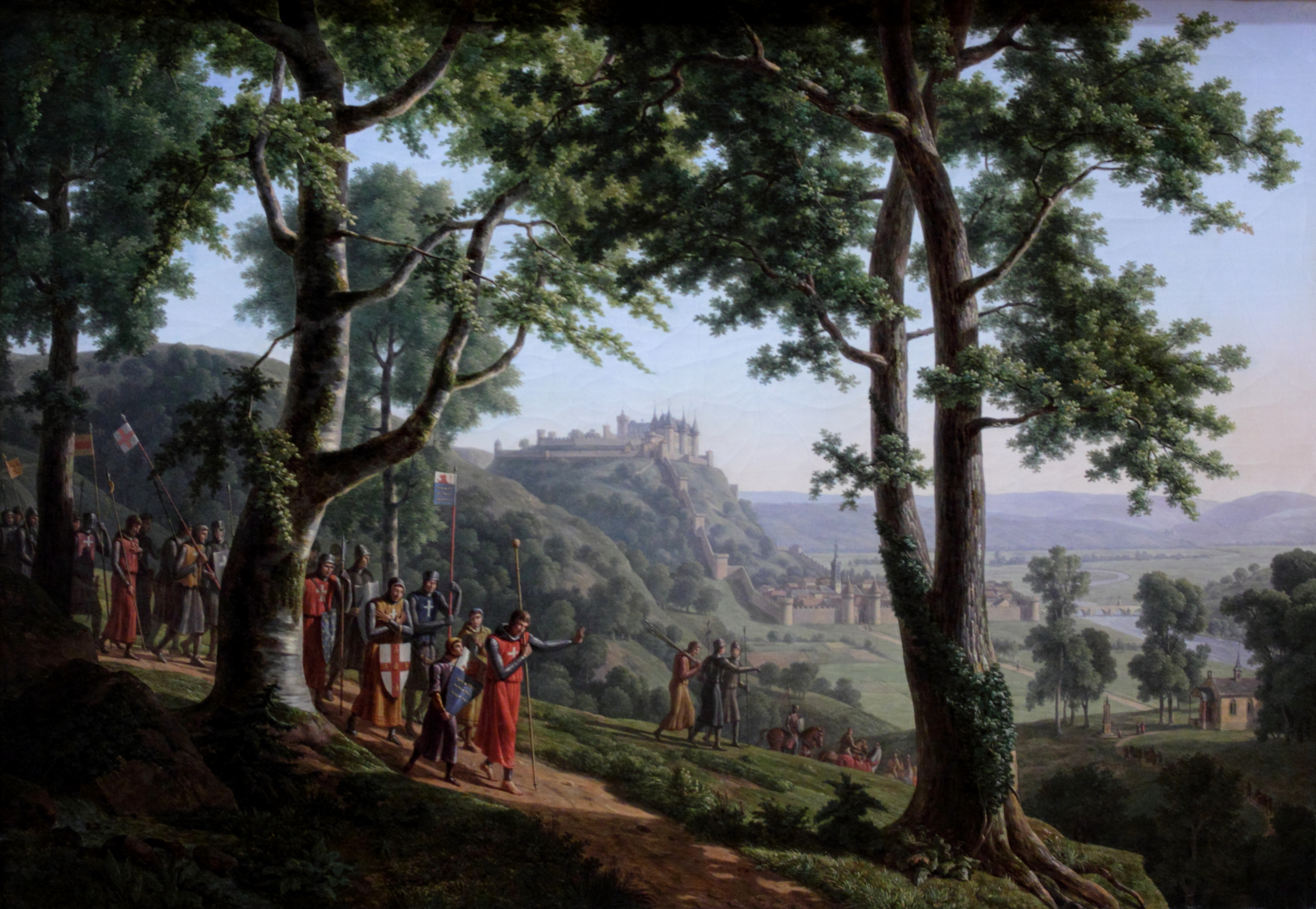
Castle and city of Joinville

In the year 1207 Simon married Ermengarde of Montclair, daughter of John of Montclair, and had:

- Geoffrey of Joinville, d. 1232, lord of Montclair; married Marie of Garlande
- Isabelle of Joinville, lady of Montclair after her brother; married Simon IV of Clermont.
- Béatrix of Joinville; married Guermond of Châlons.

Ermengarde of Montclair died in 1218, and in a second marriage Simon married Beatrix (or Beatrice) of Auxonne, daughter of Count Stephen III of Auxonne, and had:

- John (Jean) of Joinville, lord of Joinville; married Alix of Grandpré
- Geoffrey of Joinville, first baron of Geneville; married Maud de Lacy.
- Simon of Joinville, lord of Marnay and Gex; married Leonete of Geneva. Much involved with English affairs along with his elder brother Geoffrey.
- William (Guillaume) of Joinville, Archdeacon of Salins, rector of Arthinurchir (Ireland) and archdeacon of Besançon.
- Marie; married Guighes, Dauphin de Viennois.
- Simonette of Joinville; married Jean of Tilchâtel.
- Héloïse of Joinville; married Jean of Faucogney. She founded the monastery of Montigny. (This child is not included in source document.)

Important biographical note for the Joinville family. Beatrice of Auxonne had been previously married to Aymon de Faucigny by which they had a daughter, Agnes of Faucigny. Agnes was married to Peter II, Count of Savoy. This made John, Geoffrey and Simon half-brother-in-law to Peter II, Count of Savoy This relationship explains the role played by Geoffrey and Simon de Joinville at the English court and their preferment in England.

== Sources ==
- Smith, Caroline (2017). Crusading in the Age of Joinville. Routledge.
- Pollock, M.A. (2015). Scotland, England and France after the Loss of Normandy, 1204-1296. The Boydell Press.
- Evergates, Theodore (2007). The Aristocracy in the County of Champagne, 1100-1300. University of Pennsylvania Press.
- Evergates, Theodore, ed. (1993). Feudal Society in Medieval France: Documents from the County of Champagne. University of Pennsylvania Press.
- d'Arbois de Jubainville, Henri (1865). Histoire des ducs et comtes de Champagne, tomes 4a et 4b. Paris: Librairie Auguste Durand.
- Simonnet, Jules (1876). Essai sur l'histoire et la généalogie des sires de Joinville. Langres: Imprimerie et librairie Firmin Dangien.
- Delaborde, Henri-François (1894). Jean de Joinville et les seigneurs de Joinville, suivi d'un catalogue de leurs actes. Paris: Picard et fils.

| Preceded by Geoffrey V of Joinville | Lord of Joinville; 1204–1233 | Succeeded by John of Joinville |
| Preceded by Robert of Joinville | Lord of Sailly; 1201–1205 | Succeeded by Guy of Joinville |
