= List of lords and princes of Joinville =

The arms borne by Geoffrey V of Joinville, still the municipal arms today

The first known lord of Joinville (French sire or seigneur de Joinville) in the county of Champagne appears in the middle of the eleventh century. The former lordship was raised into the Principality of Joinville under the House of Guise by French king Henry II in 1551, and passed to the House of Orléans in 1688. Even though the principality was abolished with the end of the French monarchy, the title Prince of Joinville (French Prince de Joinville) continued to be used as a courtesy title.

== History ==
Joinville (from medieval Latin Jonivilla or Junivilla) lies on the river Marne in eastern Champagne. In the early eleventh century, when a castle was built or possibly just enlarged at the site, it lay close to the border between the Kingdom of France and the Holy Roman Empire. The family of the lords of the castle rose to prominence late in the eleventh century when they acquired a second castle of Vaucouleurs. From then on the lord of Joinville, as one of the few "multicastle" lords in Champagne, regularly attended the court of his superior, the count of Troyes. Lord Geoffrey III followed Count Henry I on the Second Crusade (1147–49) and afterwards was appointed seneschal of Champagne (1152), an office that became hereditary in his family.

The Joinville family patronised the Cistercian monasteries of Clairvaux and La Crête, but their relationship with the nearby Benedictine house of Montier-en-Der was one of rivalry. The family also had influence in local cathedral chapters. Guy was elected bishop of Châlons (1164–90) with the help of Count Henry I, and William became bishop of Langres (1209–19).

By the turn of the 13th century, the lordship of Joinville included, other than the area of modern-day Joinville, the modern communes of Sailly, Vaucouleurs and Marnay-sur-Marne. In 1204, Lord Geoffrey V and his younger brother Robert died while on the Fourth Crusade. Since William had entered the church, the lordship passed to the fourth brother, Simon, while the fifth, Guy was given Sailly and established a cadet lineage. Simon's sons again divided the lordship: Joinville and the seneschalcy went to John, while Vaucouleurs passed to Geoffrey in 1298, and Simon received Marnay.

In April 1551, French king Henry II elevated the lordship of Joinville into a principality, turning François, Duke of Guise, into the first prince of Joinville. His descendant Marie died without children, with her titles inherited by her cousin Anne Marie Louise d'Orléans, with the principality of Joinville becoming a possession of the House of Orléans.

In the 19th century, Louis Philippe I, who would become the last French King, bestowed on his son François the title of prince of Joinville. Upon marrying Princess Francisca of Brazil, François received as dowry a portion of lands in the South of the Empire of Brazil which were incorporated to the lands of the prince of Joinville. In 1848, the French monarchy was formally abolished and all the lands of the Orléans family in France confiscated, with the lands in Brazil becoming the last remnants of the lands of the prince of Joinville. Those lands are nowadays the Brazilian city of Joinville.

== Lords ==
=== House of Joinville ===
- ????–???? Étienne
- ????–1080 Geoffrey I
- 1080–1096 Geoffrey II
- 1096–1128 Roger
- 1128–1184 Geoffrey III, also seneschal of Champagne
- 1184–1197 Geoffrey IV
- 1197–1204 Geoffrey V, also seneschal of Champagne
- 1204–1233 Simon, also seneschal of Champagne
- 1233–1317 Jean de Joinville, also seneschal of Champagne
- 1317–1343 Anselm, also seneschal of Champagne
- 1343–1386 Henry, also seneschal of Champagne and count of Vaudémont

=== Houses of Joinville-Vaudémont-Lorraine-Guise ===
- 1386–1415 Frederick I, also count of Vaudémont
- 1415–1447 Anthony, also count of Vaudémont
- 1447–1470 Frederick II, also count of Vaudémont
- 1470–1476 Nicholas
- 1476–1508 René, also duke of Lorraine
- 1508–1550 Claude, also duke of Guise
- 1550–1551 Francis, also duke of Guise

== Princes of Joinville ==
=== House of Guise ===
- 1551–1563 Francis, also duke of Guise
- 1563–1588 Henry I, also duke of Guise
- 1588–1640 Charles, also duke of Guise
- 1640–1641 Henry II, also duke of Guise
- 1642–1654 Henriette Catherine, also duchess of Joyeuse
- 1654 Louis, also duke of Joyeuse (from 9 May 1654 until his death on 2 June 1654)
- 1654–1671 Louis Joseph, also duke of Guise
- 1671–1675 François Joseph, also duke of Guise
- 1675–1688 Marie, also duchess of Guise

=== House of Orléans ===
- 1688–1693 Anne-Marie-Louise, also duchess of Montpensier
- 1693–1701 Philippe I, also duke of Orléans
- 1701–1723 Philippe II, also duke of Orléans
- 1723–1752 Louis (II), also duke of Orléans
- 1752–1785 Louis-Philippe I, also duke of Orléans
- 1785–1793 Louis-Philippe II, also duke of Orléans
- 1793–1818 Louis Philippe III, also king of the French
- 1818–1900 François d'Orléans, Prince of Joinville

== Bibliography ==
- Delaborde, Henri-François (1894). Jean de Joinville et les seigneurs de Joinville, suivi d'un catalogue de leurs actes. Paris: Picard et fils.
- Evergates, Theodore (2007). The Aristocracy in the County of Champagne, 1100–1300. Philadelphia: University of Pennsylvania Press.
- Ficker, Carlos (1965). História de Joinville: subsídios para a crônica da colônia Dona Francisca (in European Portuguese). Impressora Ipiranga.
- Joinville, Jean de (sire) (1871). Mémoires de Jean sire de Joinville; ou, Histoire et chronique eu très-chrétien roi Saint Louis (in French). Firmin Didot frères, fils et cie.
