= William I of Dampierre =

- Lord of Dampierre
- Reign: c. 1151 – c. 1174
- Predecessor: Guy I of Dampierre
- Successor: Guy II of Dampierre
- Other titles: Lord of Saint-Dizier, Moëslains et Saint-Just
- Born: c. 1130
- Died: c. 1174
- Noble family: House of Dampierre
- Spouse: Ermengarde de Toucy
- Issue: Guy II of Dampierre; Milon; Helvide; Elisabeth; Odette
- Father: Guy I of Dampierre
- Mother: Helvide de Baudément

Guillaume I of Dampierre (c. 1130 – c. 1174) was Lord of Dampierre, Saint-Dizier, Moëslains and Saint-Just, Constable of Champagne and Viscount of Troyes in the middle of the 12th century. He was the son of Guy I of Dampierre, lord of Dampierre, and Helvide de Baudément.

== Biography ==
On the death of his older brother Anséric de Dampierre, who probably died young, he became his father's heir.

During his father's lifetime, he received the seigneury of Moëslains as an appanage, probably the ancestral stronghold of his family [1], and signed in the charters with the name of Guillaume de Moëslains. This practice was relatively common at the time and allowed a son to have an income, while his parents were alive and to gain experience in the administration of a fief.

In 1152, he was appointed Grand Buttler of Champagne Henry I, Count of Champagne.

He is one of the relatives of this count, actively participates in his court and is the witness of a large number of his charters.

In 1165, William IV, Count of Nevers, Auxerre and Tonnerre, ravaged the Abbey of Vézelay. As the King of France begins to gather the host, Count Guillaume IV de Nevers, frightened, and chooses Guillaume I de Dampierre to transmit his submission to the King.

Around 1167, he went on a pilgrimage to Jerusalem where he visited the holy places.

In 1168, he founded the priory of Macheret, of the order of Grandmont, with Hugues III de Plancy and the approval of the Count of Count of Champagne Henry I the Liberal.

Around 1170, he received the title of constable of Champagne after the death of its previous holder, Eudes de Pougy. Although this title is not hereditary, his son will also benefit from it after his death.

== Family ==
Around 1155, he married Ermengarde de Toucy [2], lady of Champlay, daughter of Ithier III, lord of Toucy, and Elisabeth de Joigny, with whom he had five children:

- Guy II of Dampierre (d. in 1216), who succeeded his father;
- Milon de Dampierre (d. after March 1228), cited in charters of 1172, 1189 and 1227;
- Helvide de Dampierre (d. after 1224), who married Jean de Montmirail, called the Blessed, Lord of Montmirail and La Ferté-Gaucher, Viscount of Meaux and Constable of France, son of André de Montmirail and Hildiarde d'Oisy, Viscountess of Meaux, with whom she has six children;
- Elisabeth de Dampierre (d. after March 1228), who married Geoffrey I of Aspremont, son of Gobert V, lord of Aspremont, and Ida de Chiny, with whom she had four children (including Jean d'Apremont who was bishop of Verdun then Metz and Blessed Gobert d'Aspremont);
- Odette de Dampierre (d. in 1212), who married Jean II de Thourotte, castellan of Thourotte and Noyon, son of Jean I of Thourotte, castellan of Thourotte and Noyon and Alix de Dreux, with whom she had nine children.

Guillaume de Dampierre and Ermengarde de Toucy separated before 1172. It is possible that he remarried afterwards, even if the name of this hypothetical wife is unknown. As for Ermangarde, she married in second marriage Dreux IV de Mello.

However, some historians think that the wife of Guillaume de Dampierre is Ermengarde de Mouchy, daughter of Dreux III de Mouchy and Edith de Warenne, and that she married Dreux IV de Mello, lord of Saint-Bris and constable of France, but this hypothesis seems slightly less credible.

== Related articles ==
- County of Champagne
- House of Dampierre
- Abbey of Macheret

== Notes and references ==
=== Notes ===
[1] The first known lord of Dampierre and Moëslains is Vitier de Moëslains. It is only from the next generation that his children will take the name of Dampierre.

[2] Édouard de Saint Phalle reports on the work of Jean-Noël Mathieu in Recherches sur l'origine des seigneurs de Moëlain-Dampierre and specifies that Guillaume's wife is Ermengarde de Toucy, lady of Champlay, living in 1209 (she married in seconds marriage from 1187 Jobert II, lord of Maligny), daughter of Ithier III, lord of Toucy, and Elisabeth de Joigny.

== Bibliography ==
- Henri d'Arbois de Jubainville, History of the Dukes and Counts of Champagne, 1865. Document used for writing the article
- Charles Savetiez, Dampierre de l'Aube and his lords, 1884. nts.
