= Audrick Linord =

French association football player (born 1987)

Personal information
- Date of birth: April 17, 1987 (age 39)
- Place of birth: La Trinité, Martinique
- Height: 1.82 m (6 ft 0 in)
- Position: Centre-back

Senior career*
Years	Team	Apps	(Gls)
–2006	US Robert		
2006–2009	US Changé		
2009–2010	Tours FC B		
2010–2014	SO Romorantin	76	(2)
2014–2016	FC Villefranche	36	(0)
2017–	Club Colonial		

International career
2004–	Martinique	12	(0)
- * Club domestic league appearances and goals

Audrick Linord (born 17 April 1987) is a footballer from Martinique who plays for Club Colonial of the Martinique Championnat National as of 2017.

== SO Romorantin ==
Shortly after his arrival from Tours in 2010, Linord suffered an injury on his right leg, forcing him to undergo operations; he was fully rejuvenated by 2011.

Owing to the suspension of Giany Joinville, the Martinique centre-back became a temporary starter, forming a defensive line with teammate Fabrice Nicolas.
