= Geoffrey V =

Geoffrey V may refer to:

- Geoffrey Plantagenet, Count of Anjou (died 1151), also Geoffrey V of Anjou
- Geoffrey V of Joinville (died 1204)
- Geoffrey V, Viscount of Châteaudun (died 1218)
