= Guy I of Dampierre =

- Lord of Dampierre
- Reign: c. 1107 – c. 1151
- Predecessor: Thibaut of Dampierre-sur-l’Aube
- Successor: William I of Dampierre
- Other titles: constable of Champagne constable of Auvergne; Viscount of Troyes
- Born: c. 1095
- Died: c. 1151
- Noble family: House of Dampierre
- Spouse: Helvide de Baudément
- Issue: Anseric; William I of Dampierre; Andre; Milon; Guy; Helvide; Agnes
- Father: Thibaut of Dampierre-sur-l’Aube
- Mother: Elisabeth de Montlhery

Guy I of Dampierre (died 1151), son of Thibaut of Dampierre-sur-l’Aube and Elizabeth of Montlhéry, daughter of Milo I of Montlhéry, Viscount of Troyes. Seigneur of Dampierre, Saint-Dizier, and Moëlain.

Guy travelled with Hugh I of Troyes on his pilgrimage to the Holy Land in 1125. It is not known whether Guy became a Knight Templar, although his son William approved the donation of property to the Templars at Provins. Guy was associated with Barisan the Old, who travelled in the Holy Land with Hugh II of Le Puiset, as well as Hugh’s uncle Guy of Le Puiset.

Guy married Helvide of Baudémont, daughter of Andre of Baudémont, Seneschal of Bourgogne, and his wife Agnes. Helvide was the widow of Hugh of Chacenay, Seigneur de Montréal. After Guy’s death, Helvide became a nun at Jully-les-Nonnains. Guy and Helvide had seven children:

- William I of Dampierre (died after 1173), Seigneur of Dampierre, Saint-Dizier, and Moëlain. Married Ermengarde of Mouchy. Their son was Guy II of Dampierre.
- Andre (died after 1165)
- Milo (died after 1165)
- Guy of Dampierre (died 1163), bishop of Chalon (1044 – c. 1058)
- Helvide (died before May 1196), Married Geoffrey IV, Seigneur of Joinville
- Agnes (died after 1192), Married Narjot, Seigneur of Toucy.

== Sources ==
- Riley-Smith, Johathan (1997). The First Crusaders, 1095-1131. Cambridge University Press.
- Schenk, Jochen (2012). Templar Families: Landowning Families and the Order of the Temple in France, c.1120-1307. Cambridge University Press.
- Peixoto, Michael J., Ghost Commandery: Shaping Local Templar Identity in the Cartulary of Provins, Proceedings of the Western Society for French History, Volume 36, 2008 (available online at the University of Michigan)

== See also ==
- House of Dampierre and the Houses of Montlhéry and Le Puiset.
