= Saint-Just-Sauvage =

- Commune
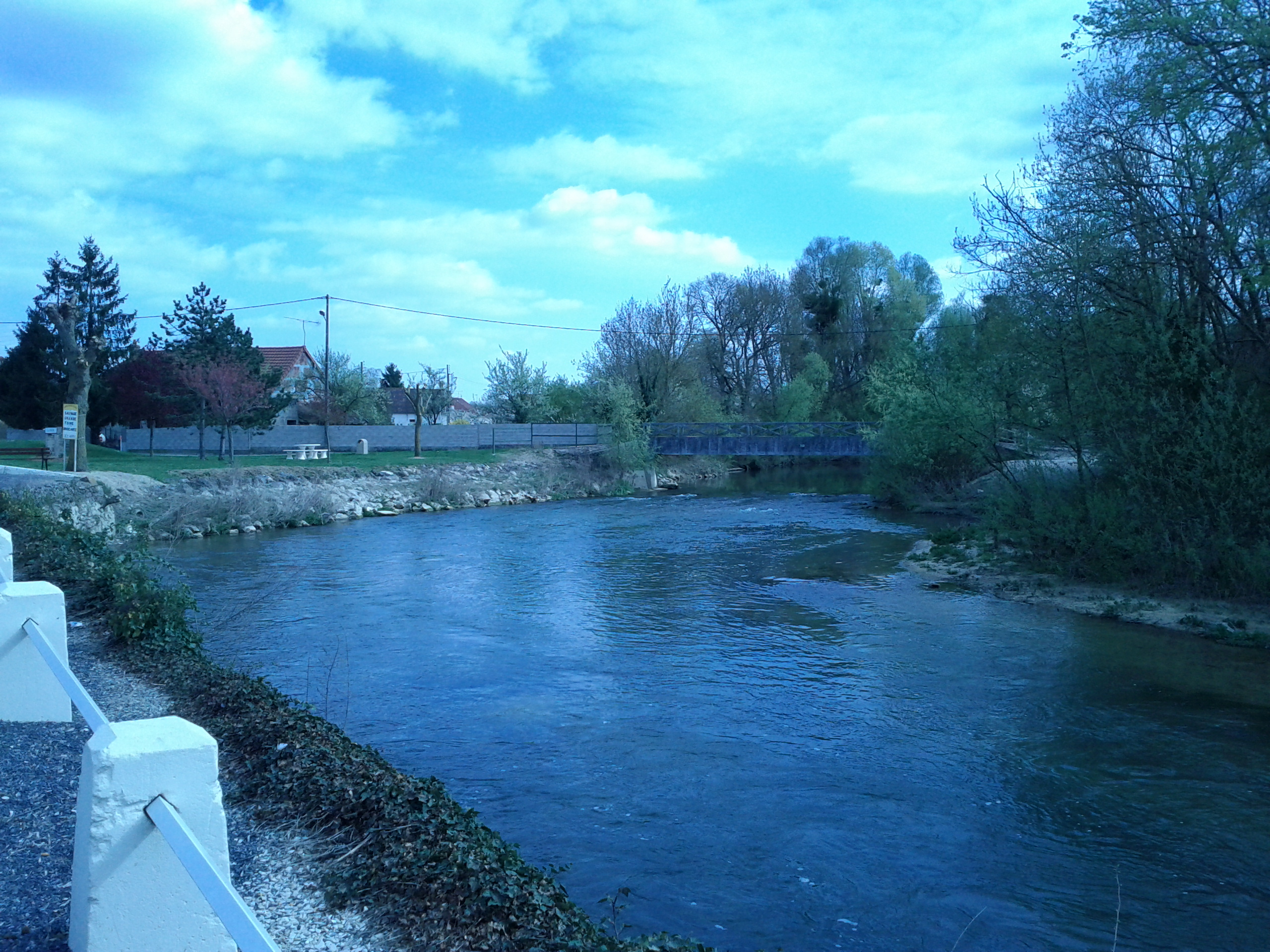
- A view within Saint-Just-Sauvage

- Coat of arms
- Location of Saint-Just-Sauvage
- Location within France Location within Grand Est
- Coordinates: 48°33′19″N 3°47′06″E
- Country: France
- Region: Grand Est
- Department: Marne
- Arrondissement: Épernay
- Canton: Vertus-Plaine Champenoise

Government
  - Mayor (2020–2026): Bruno Martin
- Area^{1}: 17.74 km^{2} (6.85 sq mi)
- Elevation: 75 m (246 ft)
- Population (2023): 1,456
  - Density: 82.07/km^{2} (212.6/sq mi)
- Time zone: UTC+01:00 (CET)
  - Summer (DST): UTC+02:00 (CEST)
- INSEE/Postal code: 51492 /51260
- ^{1} French Land Register data, which excludes lakes, ponds, glaciers > 1 km^{2} (0.386 sq mi or 247 acres) and river estuaries.

Saint-Just-Sauvage (French pronunciation: [sɛ̃ ʒy(st) sovaʒ]) is a commune in the Marne department in north-eastern France.

== See also ==
- Communes of the Marne department
