= Moëslains =

Commune in Haute-Marne, France

- Commune
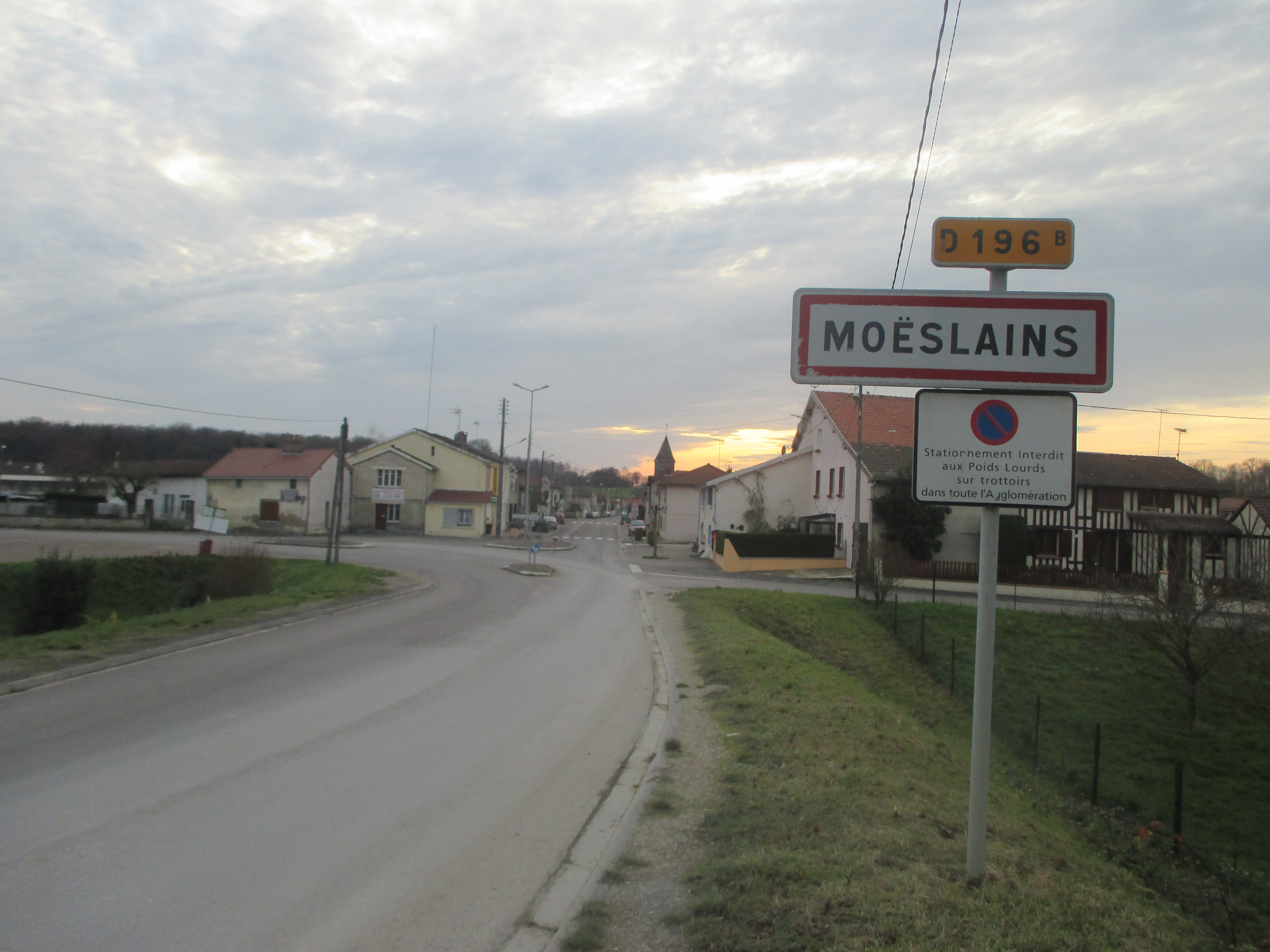
- The road into Moëslains
- Location of Moëslains
- Location within France Location within Grand Est
- Coordinates: 48°37′16″N 4°53′46″E
- Country: France
- Region: Grand Est
- Department: Haute-Marne
- Arrondissement: Saint-Dizier
- Canton: Saint-Dizier-1
- Intercommunality: CA Grand Saint-Dizier, Der et Vallées

Government
  - Mayor (2020–2026): Michel Hurson
- Area^{1}: 1.62 km^{2} (0.63 sq mi)
- Elevation: 132 m (433 ft)
- Highest elevation: 157 m (515 ft)
- Lowest elevation: 125 m (410 ft)
- Population (2023): 467
  - Density: 288/km^{2} (747/sq mi)
- Time zone: UTC+01:00 (CET)
  - Summer (DST): UTC+02:00 (CEST)
- INSEE/Postal code: 52327 /52100
- ^{1} French Land Register data, which excludes lakes, ponds, glaciers > 1 km^{2} (0.386 sq mi or 247 acres) and river estuaries.

Moëslains (French pronunciation: [mwalɛ̃]) is a commune in the Haute-Marne department in north-eastern France.

== See also ==
- Communes of the Haute-Marne department

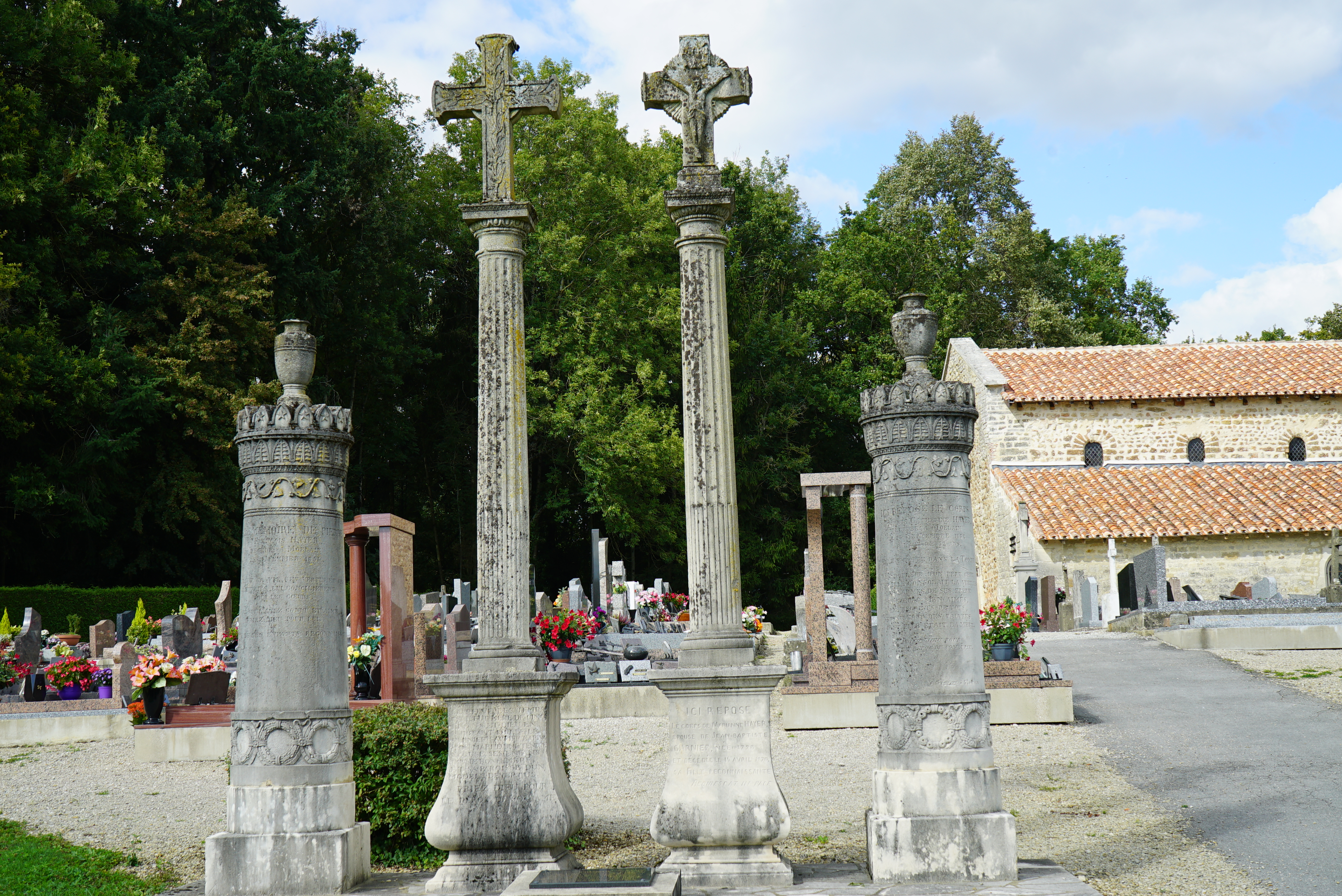
Church and cemetery
