= Marnay-sur-Marne =

- Commune
- Location of Marnay-sur-Marne
- Location within France Location within Grand Est
- Coordinates: 48°00′40″N 5°14′15″E
- Country: France
- Region: Grand Est
- Department: Haute-Marne
- Arrondissement: Chaumont
- Canton: Nogent
- Intercommunality: CA Chaumont

Government
  - Mayor (2020–2026): Stéphan Emeraux
- Area^{1}: 10.62 km^{2} (4.10 sq mi)
- Elevation: 345 m (1,132 ft)
- Population (2023): 320
  - Density: 30/km^{2} (78/sq mi)
- Time zone: UTC+01:00 (CET)
  - Summer (DST): UTC+02:00 (CEST)
- INSEE/Postal code: 52315 /52800
- ^{1} French Land Register data, which excludes lakes, ponds, glaciers > 1 km^{2} (0.386 sq mi or 247 acres) and river estuaries.

Marnay-sur-Marne (French pronunciation: [maʁnɛ syʁ maʁn], literally Marnay on Marne) is a commune in the Haute-Marne department in north-eastern France.

== See also ==
- Communes of the Haute-Marne department
