= Giany Joinville =

French footballer (born 1984)

Personal information
- Date of birth: 1 July 1984 (age 42)
- Place of birth: Saint-Claude, France
- Height: 1.90 m (6 ft 3 in)
- Position: Defender

Senior career*
Years	Team	Apps	(Gls)
2002–2003	CS Louhans-Cuiseaux	2	(0)
2003–2004	Gueugnon B	?	(?)
2004–2005	Gueugnon	7	(0)
2005–2006	Ajaccio B	?	(?)
2006	Ajaccio	1	(0)
2007–2008	CS Louhans-Cuiseaux	27	(0)
2008–2010	Libourne	46	(3)
2010–2012	ES Fréjus	39	(1)
2012–2016	SO Romorantin	88	(6)
2016–2017	Bourges 18	17	(0)
- * Club domestic league appearances and goals

Giany Joinville (born 1 July 1984) is a French former professional footballer who played as a defender.

He played on the professional level in Ligue 2 for FC Gueugnon and AC Ajaccio.
