= William of Joinville =

French ecclesiastic

William of Joinville (French Guillaume de Joinville; died 1226) was a French ecclesiastic. A younger son of Geoffrey IV of Joinville and Helvide of Dampierre, he joined the chapter of Châlons Cathedral, become archdeacon by 1191. He then became bishop of Langres and thus a pair de France in 1208 and finally archbishop of Reims in 1219. He was the candidate of King Philip Augustus to become bishop of Metz in 1212, but lost out to Conrad III of Scharfenberg.

== Sources ==
- Delaborde, Henri-François (1894). Jean de Joinville et les seigneurs de Joinville, suivi d'un catalogue de leurs actes. Paris: Picard et fils.

Catholic Church titles
Preceded by Aubrey	Archbishop of Reims; 1219–1226	Succeeded by Henry of Dreux
