= Dampierre, Aube =

Commune in Grand Est, France

Dampierre
- Commune
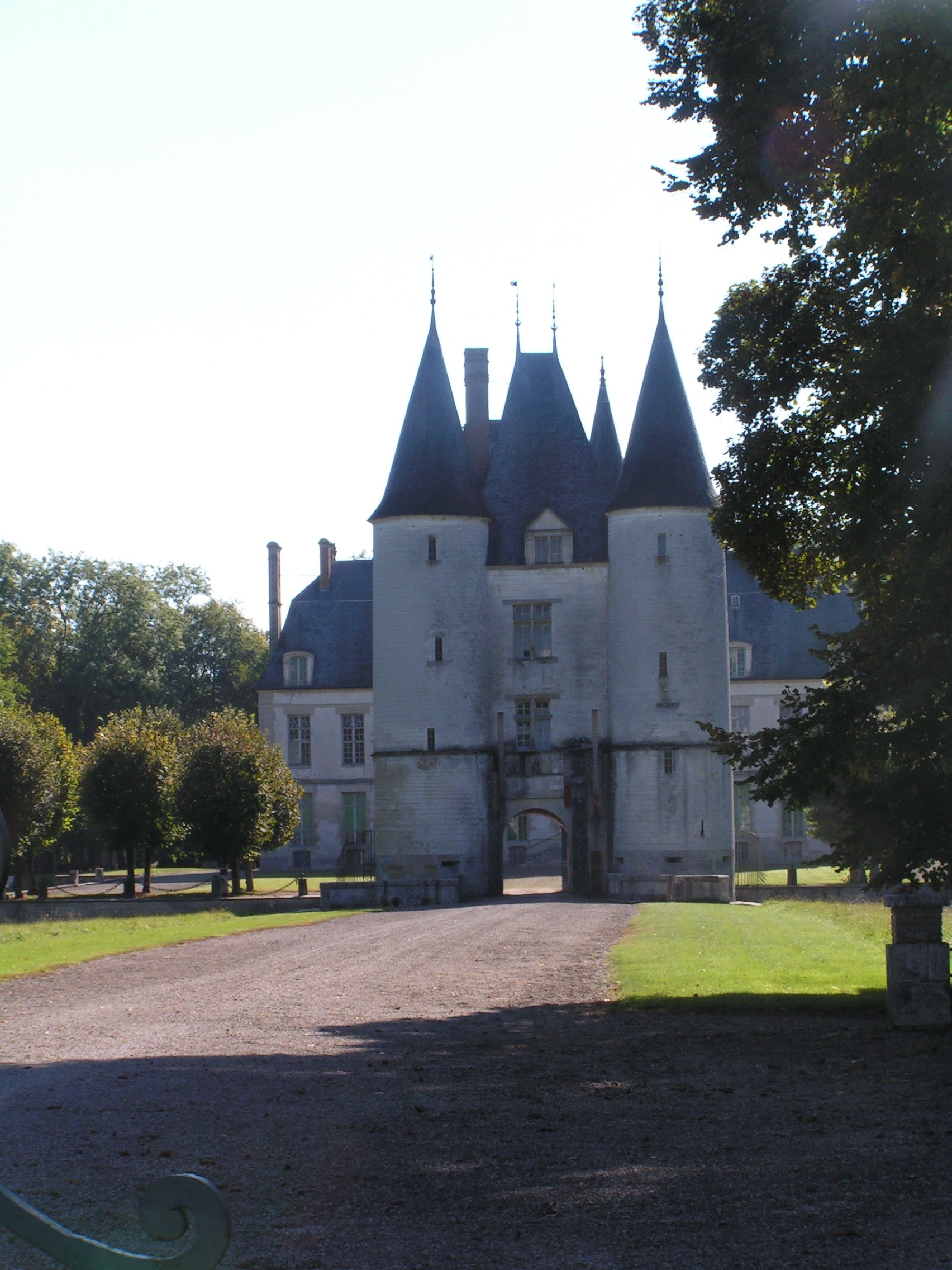
- The chateau in Dampierre
- Location of Dampierre
- Location within France Location within Grand Est
- Coordinates: 48°33′05″N 4°22′07″E
- Country: France
- Region: Grand Est
- Department: Aube
- Arrondissement: Troyes
- Canton: Arcis-sur-Aube

Government
  - Mayor (2020–2026): Guy Boncorps
- Area^{1}: 29.36 km^{2} (11.34 sq mi)
- Elevation: 153 m (502 ft)
- Highest elevation: 196 m (643 ft)
- Lowest elevation: 104 m (341 ft)
- Population (2023): 327
  - Density: 11.1/km^{2} (28.8/sq mi)
- Time zone: UTC+01:00 (CET)
  - Summer (DST): UTC+02:00 (CEST)
- INSEE/Postal code: 10121 /10240
- ^{1} French Land Register data, which excludes lakes, ponds, glaciers > 1 km^{2} (0.386 sq mi or 247 acres) and river estuaries.

Dampierre (French pronunciation: [dɑ̃pjɛʁ]) is a commune in the Aube department in north-eastern France.

== Population ==
Historical population
Year	Pop.	±% p.a.
1968	327	—
1975	302	−1.13%
1982	320	+0.83%
1990	283	−1.52%
1999	302	+0.72%
2007	299	−0.12%
2012	292	−0.47%
2017	301	+0.61%
2023	327	+1.39%
Source: INSEE

== See also ==
- Communes of the Aube department
