= Joinville, Haute-Marne =

Joinville
- Commune
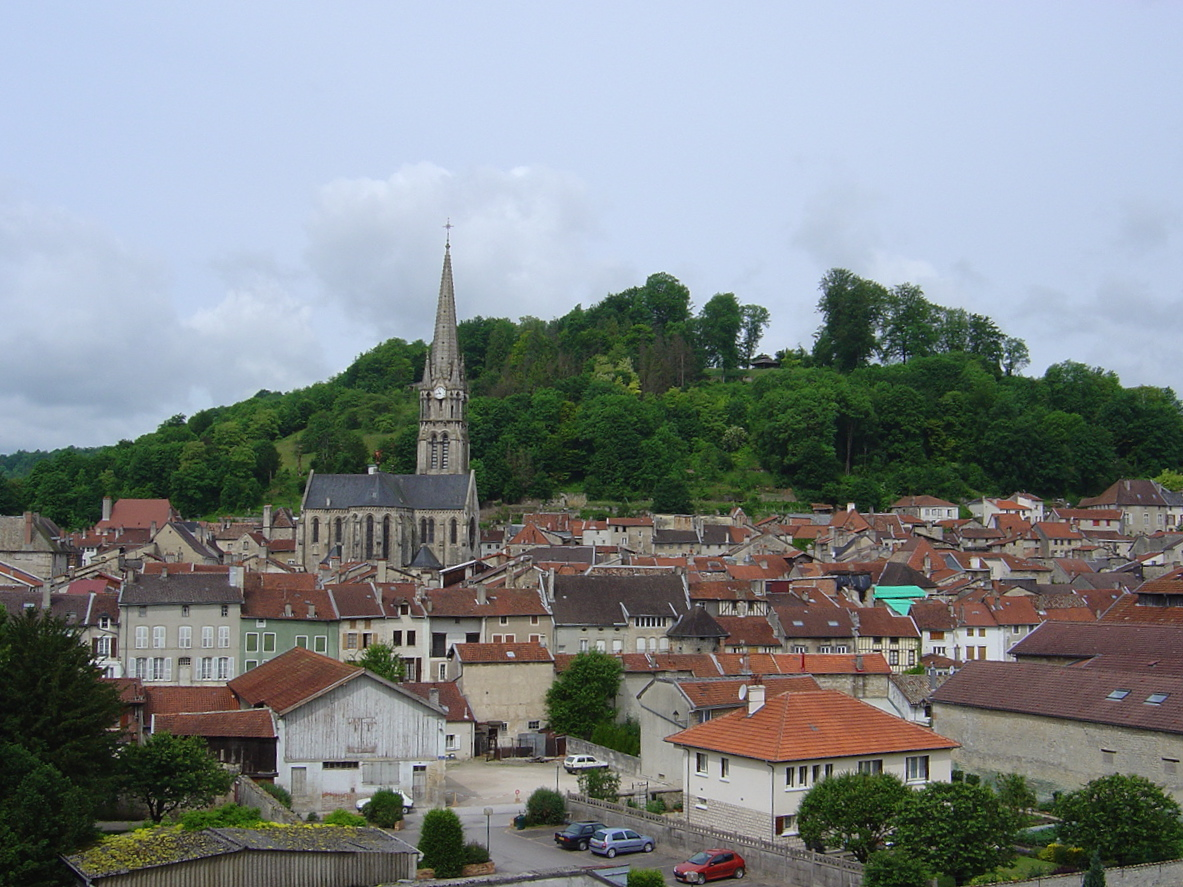
- View of Joinville

- Coat of arms
- Location of Joinville
- Location within France Location within Grand Est
- Coordinates: 48°26′35″N 5°08′20″E
- Country: France
- Region: Grand Est
- Department: Haute-Marne
- Arrondissement: Saint-Dizier
- Canton: Joinville
- Intercommunality: Bassin de Joinville en Champagne

Government
  - Mayor (2020–2026): Bertrand Ollivier
- Area^{1}: 18.94 km^{2} (7.31 sq mi)
- Elevation: 280 m (920 ft)
- Population (2023): 2,915
  - Density: 153.9/km^{2} (398.6/sq mi)
- Time zone: UTC+01:00 (CET)
  - Summer (DST): UTC+02:00 (CEST)
- INSEE/Postal code: 52250 /52300
- ^{1} French Land Register data, which excludes lakes, ponds, glaciers > 1 km^{2} (0.386 sq mi or 247 acres) and river estuaries.

Joinville (French pronunciation: [ʒwɛ̃vil]) is a commune in the Haute-Marne department in north-eastern France.

Originally spelled Jonivilla or Junivilla in Latin, in the Middle Ages it was the site of a lordship in the county of Champagne. The medieval château-fort, which gave the House of Guise their title, Prince de Joinville, was demolished during the Revolution of 1789, but the 16th-century Château du Grand Jardin built by Claude de Lorraine, duc de Guise, has been restored.

The commune is listed as a Village étape.

== Population ==
Historical population
Year	Pop.	±% p.a.
1968	4,565	—
1975	4,774	+0.64%
1982	4,804	+0.09%
1990	4,755	−0.13%
1999	4,380	−0.91%
2007	3,809	−1.73%
2012	3,486	−1.76%
2017	3,069	−2.52%
2023	2,915	−0.85%
Source: INSEE

== Transport ==
Joinville station is served by regional trains between Saint-Dizier and Chaumont. Joinville Mussey Airport (ICAO code LFFJ) is a small aifield, mainly used for gliding.

== Twin towns – sister cities ==
Joinville is twinned with:

- Buckingham, United Kingdom

== Personalities ==
- Jean de Joinville
- Claude de Lorraine
- Louis de Guise, cardinal évêque de Metz
- François Lespingola
- Louis Yard
- Joseph Perrin des Almons (1717-1798)
- François Devienne
- Anne Joseph Arnoux Valdruche
- Christian Vander (musician) (1948 - )

== See also ==
- Communes of the Haute-Marne department
