= John of Joinville =

French chronicler (1224–1317)

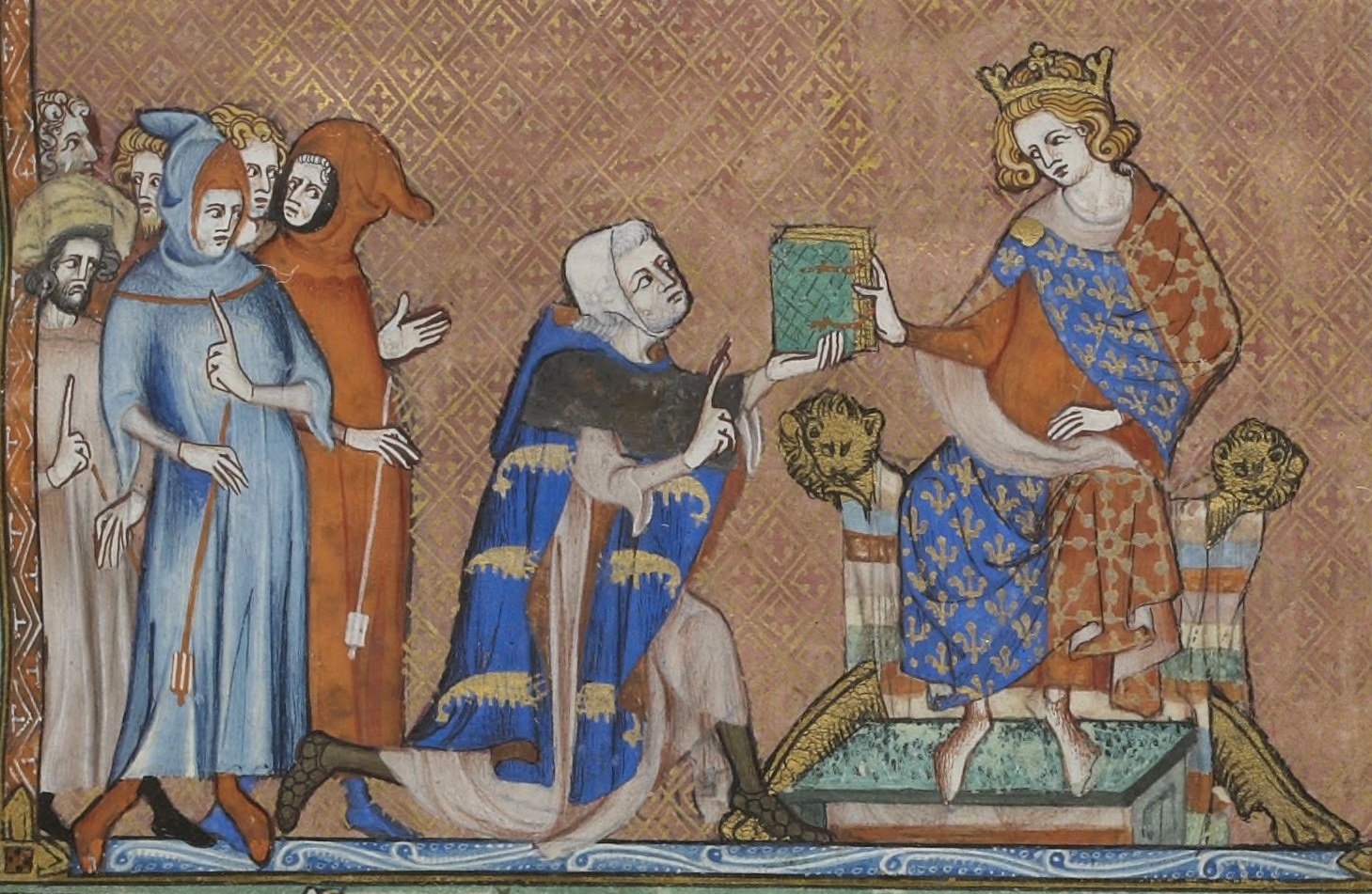
- Jean de Joinville presenting his book Life of Saint Louis to Louis X of France, miniature, 1330s.
- Born: 1 May 1224
- Died: 24 December 1317 (aged 93)
- Occupations: Knight, biographer

John of Joinville (French: Jean, French pronunciation: [ʒɑ̃ də ʒwɛ̃vil], 1 May 1224 – 24 December 1317) was one of the great chroniclers of medieval France. He is most famous for writing the Life of Saint Louis, a biography of Louis IX of France that chronicled the Seventh Crusade.

== Biography ==
Son of Simon of Joinville and Béatrice d'Auxonne, and brother of Geoffrey de Geneville, Jean belonged to a noble family from Champagne. He received an education befitting a young noble at the court of Theobald IV of Champagne, including reading, writing, and Latin. On the death of his father in 1233, he became lord of Joinville and seneschal of Champagne (and was therefore personally connected to Theobald IV). He was a very pious man and was concerned with the proper administration of the region.

In 1241, he accompanied Theobald to the court of Louis IX of France (the future Saint Louis). In 1244, when Louis organized the Seventh Crusade, Joinville decided to join with the Christian knights just as his father had done 35 years earlier against the Albigensians. At the time of the crusade, Joinville placed himself in the service of the king and became his counsellor and confidant. In 1250, when the king and his troops were captured by the Mameluks in the Battle of Al Mansurah, Joinville, among the captives, participated in the negotiations and the collection of the ransom. Joinville probably brought himself even closer to the king in the difficult times that followed the failure of the crusade (including the death of his brother Robert, Count of Artois). It was Joinville who advised the king to stay in the Holy Land instead of returning immediately to France as the other lords had wanted; the king followed Joinville's advice. During the following four years spent in the Holy Land, Joinville was the constant advisor to the king, who knew that he could count on Joinville's frankness and absolute devotion.

In 1270, Louis IX, although very weakened physically, undertook a new crusade with his three sons. Any enthusiasm of Joinville had been knocked out of him from the previous crusade, and he refused to follow Louis, recognizing the uselessness of the enterprise and convinced that the duty of the king was not to leave the kingdom that needed him. In fact, the expedition was a worse disaster than its predecessor and the king died of dysentery outside Tunis on 25 August 1270.

From 1271, the papacy carried out a long inquest on the subject of Louis IX, which ended with his canonization, announced in 1297 by Pope Boniface VIII. As Joinville had been a close friend of the king, his counsellor and his confidant, his testimony was invaluable to the inquest, where he appeared as a witness in 1282.

At the request of Jeanne of Navarre, the queen, he began work on the Histoire de Saint Louis, which he completed in 1309. Joinville died on 24 December 1317, at the age of 93, nearly fifty years after the death of Louis.

== Life of Saint Louis ==
=== Commissioning of the work ===
Jeanne of Navarre, wife of Philip IV of France (and granddaughter of Count Theobald IV), asked Joinville to write Louis' biography. He then put himself to the task of writing livre des saintes paroles et des bons faiz de nostre saint roy Looÿs (as he himself called it), today known as the Life of Saint Louis. Jeanne of Navarre died on 2 April 1305, while the work was not yet completed. Joinville dedicated it in 1309 to her son, Louis, king of Navarre and count of Champagne, the future Louis X of France.

=== Composition and date ===
As noted, the book was not completed when Jeanne of Navarre died in 1305. In addition, the oldest existing manuscript ends with this note: "Ce fu escript en l'an de grace mil .CCC. et .IX. [1309], ou moys d'octovre". This is not precisely the date of the writing of the manuscript, because it was obviously written later. Therefore, it is either the date of the completion of the work by Joinville, or the date of the manuscript which served as the model to the surviving copies. The work was therefore written between 1305 and 1309. By other evidence, one can equally argue that a passage at the very end of the book, relating a dream of Joinville, could not have been written before 1308. Joinville therefore finished his work a short time before giving it to Louis.

=== Tradition of the text ===
The surviving manuscripts consist of one old copy of the text and two later copies. The manuscript that was given to Louis has not survived.

The oldest manuscript is obviously very close to the original. It is found in the inventory of 1373 of the library of Charles V of France. Furthermore, according to the illuminations, it can be dated to the years 1330–1340, about 20 years after the original manuscript. This copy remained in the royal library and then passed to Philip the Good, Duke of Burgundy, before reaching Brussels, where it was lost. It was rediscovered only in 1746, when Brussels was taken by French troops. This Brussels manuscript is now located in the Bibliothèque nationale de France. It is one volume of 391 pages in two columns. The first page is decorated with gold and illuminations, and with a painting representing Joinville presenting his book to Louis. The text is divided into paragraphs, each beginning with a gilded letter.

Two editions have been created from one translation of Joinville's text (which does not survive itself), created by Antoine Pierre in 1547 and by Claude Ménard in 1617, respectively. Pierre's text is corrupted by modifications of the original text and fanciful additions, while Ménard's is an excellent scholarly work.

Finally, a third copy of the text comes from two manuscripts which appear to date from the second quarter of the 16th century. These are modernized transcriptions with systematic renovation of the language, from one older manuscript and the Brussels manuscript.

=== General perspectives on the work ===
Joinville was a knight. He was neither a cleric skilled in composing books nor a chronicler informed by researching written or oral information. Nevertheless, his writing is sincere and neutral. He wrote about everything he personally experienced during the reign of Saint Louis, essentially the crusade in Egypt and their stay in the Holy Land. His narrative is full of life, anecdotes and even humour. It is more of a personal testimony about the king than a history of his reign.

The freshness and precision of his memories are impressive, especially since he wrote his work some decades after the fact. Certain medievalists explain this by supposing that Joinville had often recounted his past orally or that he had previously committed it to writing before beginning his work.

Joinville speaks almost as much about himself as he does about the king, the subject of his book, but he does it in such a natural manner that he never gives the impression that he wants to place himself above the king. Thus we have an incomparable clarity about the ways of thinking of a 13th-century man. For this reason, modern editors have sometimes said the work is more of a memoir than a history or a biography of Saint Louis.

=== The holy words ===
The first part of Joinville's work is dedicated to the holy words of the king. Joinville writes about the edifying words of the king and his Christian virtues.

Speeches are very important among Louis' court. His speech is moral and didactic, reflecting the speech of the preachers (Dominicans and Franciscans) who surround him. It transmits a moral and religious teaching and often aims to strengthen the faith of the recipient. An intimacy exists between the king and his followers (his family, confidants, and counsellors, among whom are Joinville and Robert de Sorbon) who express themselves particularly in the conversation: the king invites his audience to respond to his questions, often with the aim of instructing them with moral and religious plans. This importance of the royal speech is particularly well rendered by Joinville, who often has his characters speak. He is one of the first memoirists to integrate reconstructed dialogue into a tale. He most often uses a direct style and marks the interventions of his characters with "he said" or "he did." And Joinville never has his characters speak in long monologues: the lessons are always shown through dialogue.

In addition, it is through the words of the king that his profound faith and sanctity are shown. For Joinville, Louis IX embodies the ideal prud'homme - pious, courageous, kind, intelligent and wise, a man who defends the Christian faith by his courage. And in fact, in Joinville's work he describes the king as having an ardent love of God, benevolent to his people, humble, moderate and courteous, wise and just, peaceful, loyal and generous. In some respects, Joinville is sometimes not far from writing a hagiography.

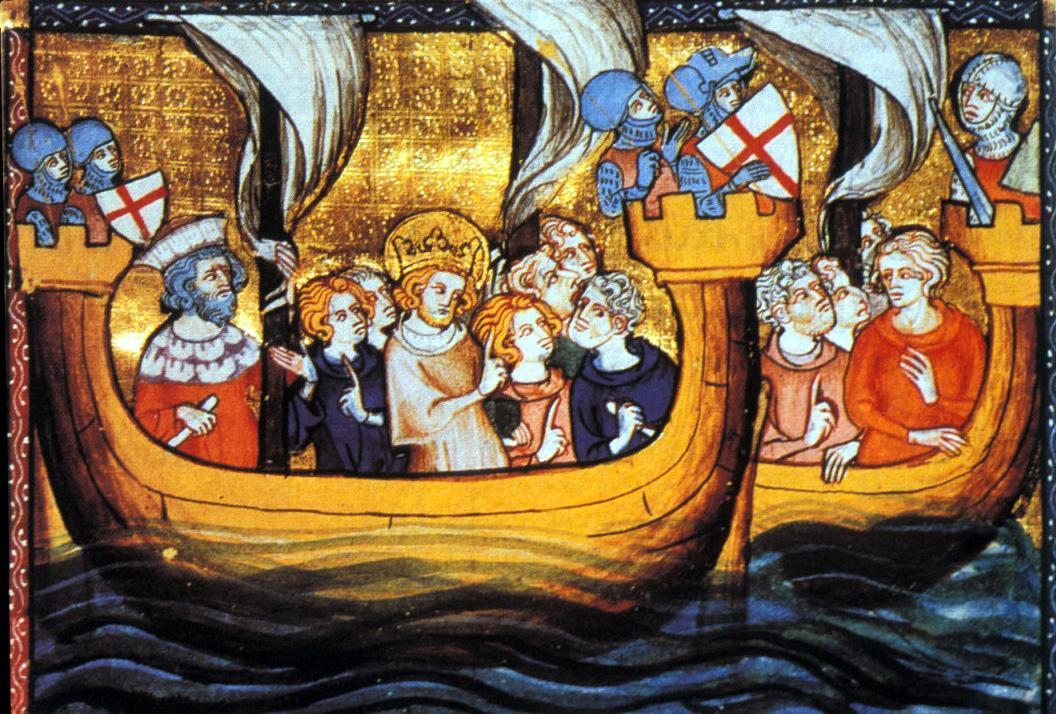
Seventh Crusade

Joinville, like his king, was obviously very attached to the Christian religion, to its doctrines, its morality and its practices. For proof of this, there is a small work of edification, composed in 1250, titled li romans as ymages des poinz de nostre foi, where Joinville makes a brief commentary on the Credo. But his deep and sincere faith contrasts with the almost exalted Christian heroism of the king. The Christianity of Joinville is closer to that of the common people.

=== The crusade ===
Joinville recounts equally the high deeds of Saint Louis, in particular the unfolding of the Seventh Crusade and the following stay in the Holy Land, which occupies most of the book. In 1244, when Louis organized the Seventh Crusade, Joinville decided to abandon his family to join with the Christian knights just as his father had done 35 years earlier against the Albigensians.

== Family ==
Married to Alix de Grandpré, daughter of Henri IV, comte de Grandpré and Dame de Livry, Marie de Garlande. Together they had the following issue:

- Jean de Joinville, Seigneur de Reynel
- Geoffroi de Joinville, Seigneur de Briquenay

Married to Alix de Reynel, daughter of Gautier de Reynel and Hélissende de Trainel. Had the following issue:

- Jean de Joinville, Seigneur de Reynel
- Geoffroi de Joinville, Seigneur de Briquenay
- Anseau de Joinville, seigneur de Joinville
- André de Joinville, Seigneur de Beaupré & de Bonnay
- Alix de Joinville
- Gautier de Joinville de Beaupré
- Marguerite de Joinville

== Bibliography ==
- Cristian Bratu, « Je, auteur de ce livre »: L’affirmation de soi chez les historiens, de l’Antiquité à la fin du Moyen Âge. Later Medieval Europe Series (vol. 20). Leiden: Brill, 2019 (ISBN 978-90-04-39807-8).
- Cristian Bratu, "Je, aucteur de ce livre: Authorial Persona and Authority in French Medieval Histories and Chronicles." In Authorities in the Middle Ages. Influence, Legitimacy and Power in Medieval Society. Sini Kangas, Mia Korpiola, and Tuija Ainonen, eds. (Berlin/New York: De Gruyter, 2013): 183–204.
- Cristian Bratu, "Clerc, Chevalier, Aucteur: The Authorial Personae of French Medieval Historians from the 12th to the 15th centuries." In Authority and Gender in Medieval and Renaissance Chronicles. Juliana Dresvina and Nicholas Sparks, eds. (Newcastle upon Tyne: Cambridge Scholars Publishing, 2012): 231–259.
