= Sailly, Haute-Marne =

Sailly
- Commune
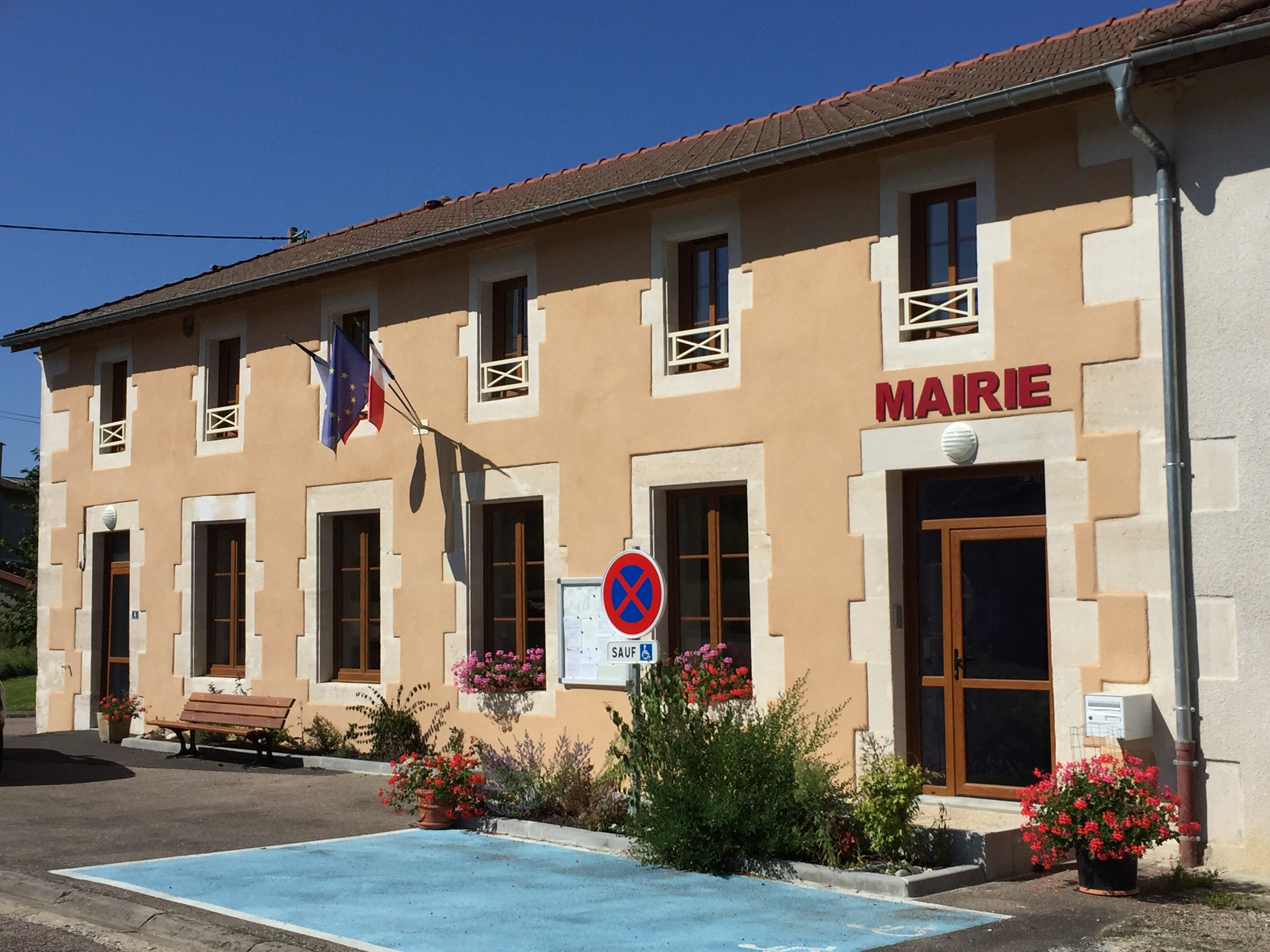
- The town hall in Sailly

- Coat of arms
- Location of Sailly
- Location within France Location within Grand Est
- Coordinates: 48°26′05″N 5°16′27″E
- Country: France
- Region: Grand Est
- Department: Haute-Marne
- Arrondissement: Saint-Dizier
- Canton: Poissons
- Intercommunality: Bassin de Joinville en Champagne

Government
  - Mayor (2020–2026): Elodie Fadel
- Area^{1}: 12.49 km^{2} (4.82 sq mi)
- Elevation: 270 m (890 ft)
- Highest elevation: 392 m (1,286 ft)
- Lowest elevation: 241 m (791 ft)
- Population (2023): 33
  - Density: 2.6/km^{2} (6.8/sq mi)
- Time zone: UTC+01:00 (CET)
  - Summer (DST): UTC+02:00 (CEST)
- INSEE/Postal code: 52443 /52230
- ^{1} French Land Register data, which excludes lakes, ponds, glaciers > 1 km^{2} (0.386 sq mi or 247 acres) and river estuaries.

Sailly (French pronunciation: [saji]) is a commune in the Haute-Marne department in north-eastern France.

== See also ==
- Communes of the Haute-Marne department
